= Lists of fictional species =

There are a number of lists of fictional species:

== Extraterrestrial ==
- List of fictional extraterrestrials (by media type)
- Lists of fictional alien species: A, B, C, D, E, F, G, H, I, J, K, L, M, N, O, P, Q, R, S, T, U, V, W, X, Y, Z

== Humanoid ==
- Lists of humanoids
  - Literature
  - Comics
  - Television
  - Film
  - Video games
- Paleoanthropological hoaxes
  - Cardiff Giant
  - Nebraska Man
  - Piltdown Man
- Freak show
- Humanzee
- List of fictional extraterrestrials

== Legendary ==
- List of legendary creatures
  - List of legendary creatures by type
- List of giants in mythology and folklore
- Vampire folklore by region

== Mythical ==
- Legendary creatures of the Argentine Northwest region
- Mythical creatures in Burmese folklore
- List of Greek mythological creatures
- List of legendary creatures from Japan
- List of Philippine mythological creatures
- Supernatural beings in Slavic folklore

== Plants and fungi ==
- List of fictional plants

== Reptilian ==
- List of dragons
  - List of dragons in mythology and folklore
  - List of dragons in literature
  - List of dragons in popular culture
  - List of dragons in film and television
  - List of dragons in games
- List of fictional dinosaurs

== Theological ==
- List of fictional angels
- List of fictional demons
