= Lists of fictional extraterrestrial species and races =

This is a list of lists of fictional extraterrestrial species and races.

== Alphabetical ==
A, B, C, D, E, F, G, H, I, J, K, L, M, N, O, P, Q, R, S, T, U, V, W, X, Y, Z

== By medium & franchise ==
=== Literature ===
- List of Noon Universe alien races

=== Comics ===
- List of alien races in DC Comics
- List of alien races in Marvel Comics

=== Film and television ===
- List of Doctor Who universe creatures and aliens
- List of Star Trek aliens
- List of Star Wars creatures
- Lists of Star Wars species: A–E, F–J, K–O, P–T, U–Z
- Species of the Marvel Cinematic Universe

=== Games ===
- Battlelords of the 23rd Century#Races
- Races of Mass Effect
- Races of StarCraft

== By appearance ==
- List of humanoid aliens
- List of avian humanoids
- List of piscine and amphibian humanoids
- List of reptilian humanoids
