= List of fictional extraterrestrial species and races: T =

Name	Source	Notes
Taalo	Star Control	The only member of the Sentient Milieu known to inhabit the region of space currently occupied by the New Alliance of Free Stars. They are large, rock-like creatures. The unusual silicon-based physiology of the Taalo did not trigger the instinctual territoriality of the Ur-Quan and the two races became friends, resulting in the entrance of the Ur-Quan into the Sentient Milieu. They were highly advanced technologically, their final creation being the Taalo Shield, created in desperation for their allies as a protection against Dnyarri mind-control.
Tachidi	Master of Orion III	
Taelons	Gene Roddenberry's Earth: Final Conflict	Humanoid
Tagorians	Noon Universe	
Takeshi Goda (Parallel Planet on the contrary)	Doraemon	Humanoid who is the gender-swapped version of Takeshi Goda
Taiidan	Homeworld	Humanoid
Tamako Nobi (Parallel Planet on the contrary)	Doraemon	Humanoid who is the gender-swapped version of Tamako Nobi
Tak Tak	Star Trek	
Talan	Outcast	
Talarian	Star Trek	
Talaxian	Star Trek	Humanoid
Tallerian	Warhammer 40,000	
Talokians	DC Comics' Legion of Super-Heroes	
Talpaedan	Ben 10	Resembling robotic, bipedal armadillos, these hail from the planet Poiana Lüncas in the Andromeda Galaxy. Their arms have powerful jackhammers, allowing them to punch with extreme power, dig underground rapidly, generate earthquakes, and transform their hands into drills.
Talosian	Star Trek	
Tamaraneans	Teen Titans	Orange-skinned humanoids from planet Tamaran who are able to unleash ultraviolet blasts called "starbolts" and fly faster than light. Their powers are connected to their emotions, and their society encourages the open expression of emotion.
Tamarian	Star Trek	
Tanakas	Taro the Space Alien	a blue-face and body humanoid: Taro Tanaka and Hanako Tanaka
Tandaran	Star Trek	
Tandu	David Brin's Uplift Universe	
Tangeans	Buzz Lightyear of Star Command	A humanoid being that can phase through objects and read minds.
Tanndai Techknight	Battlelords of the 23rd Century	
Tarellian	Star Trek	
Tarentatek	Star Wars	
Targum	Umor targumskega diplomata	Plantoid
Tarkans	Farscape	Humanoid
Taronyu	SCP Foundation (Ad Astra Per Aspera canon)	Six-sexed humanoid aliens whose survivors fled their homeworld of Mo'ara due a series of apocalyptic disasters. Since reaching the Solar System in the 2030s and being granted refuge by human and Martian civilizations, the taronyu terraformed and colonized Callisto as their new homeworld, also integrating into communities on Mars and in Luna Korea (a nation of South Korean colonies on the Moon).
Tarkas	Sword of the Stars	
Tasoth	X-COM: Terror from the Deep	
Tatanga	Super Mario Land	Humanoid
Tanakas	Taro the Space Alien	a blue-face and body humanoid: Taro Tanaka and Hanako Tanaka
Tau	Warhammer 40,000	Humanoid
Tavleks	Farscape	Humanoid
Taxxons	K. A. Applegate's Animorphs	Large centipede-like creatures with several big hands and an undying hunger
Tc'a	C. J. Cherryh's Chanur novels	
Tchoung	Valérian and Laureline	
Teacher (Parallel Planet on the contrary)	Doraemon	Humanoid who is the gender-swapped version of the Teacher
Technarchy	Marvel Comics	The Technarchy are a techno-organic species originating from the planet Kvch. The most prominent members of the Technarchy are Warlock and his father Magus.
Tecresean	Battlelords of the 23rd Century	
Tellarite	Star Trek	
Temarkians	Utopia	
Tenctonese	Alien Nation	
Tenebrian	Hal Clement's Close to Critical	
Tentaculat	X-COM: Terror from the Deep	
Terileptils	Doctor Who	
Terminids	Helldivers and Helldivers 2	
Terra Novans	Star Trek	
Terran	Final Fantasy IX	
Terrellian	Star Trek	Humanoid
Terrians	Earth 2	They are humanoid in shape but not in physiology. Their chemical structure is not carbon-based, and they are symbiotic with their planet and able to move through the soil. They communicate with humans through dreams.
Tetramand	Ben 10	Four-armed and four-eyed humanoids from the desert planet Khoros, Tetramands are known for being brutal to outsiders and having harsh punishments for small infractions. All Tetramands possess immense strength, with females being stronger than males.
Tetraps	Doctor Who	
Thalan	Galactic Civilizations II: Dread Lords	
Thalians	Star Fleet	They are humanoid in appearance. Due to their mixed appearances, it is unclear if they belong in a definitive race or are many races out of the Thalian Zone after domination from the Imperial Alliance. All have robotic/cybernetic attachments replacing certain parts of their bodies. These range from robotic lobsters/centipedes over one eye to symbiotic talking faces and at least one arm is replaced with a robotic one.
Thalonian	Star Trek	
Thals	Doctor Who	
Than-Thre-Kull	Andromeda	Insectoids
Thanagarian	DC Comics	
Thargoids	Elite / Captain Kremmen	
Thasian	Star Trek	
Thep Khufan	Ben 10	Hailing from planet Anur Khufos, the Thep Khufan resemble mummies. Their bandages can extend far distances, and they are thus able to manipulate their bodies at will. They can also regenerate rapidly.
Therbian (see Aaamazzarite)	Star Trek	
Thermians	Galaxy Quest	Humanoid appearance due to holographic cloaking, their true form is octopoidal. Friendly and naive, petitioning for help against oppression.
Therons	Dan Dare stories	
The Others	The 5th Wave	City-sized alien spaceship. Nickname given by Cassie Sullivan. They created a series of "waves" to wipe out humanity and invade Earth.
The Thing	Who Goes There?, The Thing from Another World, and The Thing (including a video game sequel, novelization/comic book series, and a prequel)	Parasites that have the capability to shape-shift, thus imitating its hosts after assimilating them.
The Strangers	Knowing	
Tholian	Star Trek	
Thraddash	Star Control	Rhinoceros-like humanoid
Thranx	Alan Dean Foster's Humanx Commonwealth series	
Thrint	Larry Niven's Known Space	
Thunder	Alienoid	Humanoid
Thuranin	Craig Alanson's Expeditionary Force Series	Little green cybernetic humanoids.
Tiberians	Buzz Aldrin and John Barnes' Encounter With Tiber	
Tidorians	Marcin Mortka's Zagubieni. Inwazja	Humanoids from ice planet Tidoris, with two horns on their heads, gray skin and big black eyes.
Tilikanthua	Utopia	
Time Lords of Gallifrey	Doctor Who	Humanoid
Tines	Vernor Vinge's A Fire Upon the Deep	Dog-like group intelligences
Titanians	DC Comics' Legion of Super-Heroes	The Titanians are humanoid aliens originating from the moon Titan with the ability of telepathy. In some depictions, they are descended from human colonists.
Titanide	John Varley's Gaea trilogy	
Titans	Yoko Tsuno	The nickname comes from the fact that they are gigantic insectoids. They have strong telepathic abilities and need cybernetics to survive on an Earth-like planet.
T'Lani	Star Trek	
Tleilaxu	Dune universe	
Tnuctip	Larry Niven's Known Space	
Toclafane	Doctor Who	
Togruta	Star Wars	Humanoid
Tok'ra	Stargate SG-1	
To'kustar	Ben 10	To'kustars are a rare species created during cosmic storms. They have the ability to generate beams of cosmic energy and possess immense size and strength.
Tollan	Stargate SG-1	
Toluen	Imperium Galactica II: Alliances	
Tony	Hetalia	
Torians	Galactic Civilizations	
To'ul'h	Orion's Arm	Bat-like quadrupeds capable of gliding
Trabe	Star Trek	Humanoid
Tractators	Doctor Who	
Traeki	David Brin's Uplift Universe	
Tralfamadorians	Kurt Vonnegut's The Sirens of Titan and Slaughterhouse 5	Resembling toilet plungers with hands in which eyes are set, they can see in four dimensions allowing them to see past, present, and future. They believe that when something dies, it continues living in another time and place, leading to their famous saying: "So it goes".
Tran	Alan Dean Foster's Icerigger	
Transylian	Ben 10	Cyborg-like aliens hailing from planet Anur Transyl, they greatly resemble Frankenstein's monster, and are equipped with tesla coils on their shoulders. They can manipulate electromagnetic energy this way, allowing them to unleash electrical blasts, control technology, and cling to solid surfaces.
Transylvanians	Rocky Horror Picture Show	
Transformer	Transformers	
Trandoshans	Star Wars	
Traskans	Farscape	Humanoid
Treecats	David Weber's Honorverse	Six-legged cat-like creatures native to the planet Sphinx in the Manticore System. They are a tool-using race that loves celery.
Treens	Dan Dare stories	
Tree Trunks' Alien Children	Adventure Time	Tree Trunks and her alien husband's children, they have alien grays' face and Tree Trunks-like bodies
Tribble	Star Trek	Compare with the earlier flat cats from Robert A. Heinlein's The Rolling Stones.
Triceraton	Teenage Mutant Ninja Turtles	
Trilarians	Master of Orion II	
Trillions	Nicholas Fisk books	Small collective crystals
Trills	Star Trek	
Trinocs	Larry Niven's Known Space	
Triscene	X-COM: Terror from the Deep	
Trolls	Homestuck	Trolls that are characterized by their horns and grey colored skin. Beta Universe Trolls hail from the planet Alternia, while Alpha Universe Trolls hail from the planet Beforus.
Trommites	DC Comics' Legion of Super-Heroes	The Trommites are a humanoid species originating from the planet Trom. They were massacred by the space pirate Roxxas, which left Jan Arrah the sole survivor as he was off-planet at the time.
Trytolians	Marcin Mortka's Zagubieni. Inwazja	Reptilian species, that communicate telepathically. They were hostile civilization divided into numerous clans, that would invade and pillage other civilization, taking slaves, and committing genocide on other telepathic species. In 24th century, they had invaded the Solar System.
Tryvuulians	Final Space	
Tsiongi	Harry Turtledove's Worldwar series	A domestic animal native to Home and kept as pets by the Race. The plural of tsiongi is 'tsiongyu'. Tsiongyu got along well with both Lizards and human beings, but were not as friendly or playful as the beffel, an animal with which the tsiongi tended to fight. Domestic tsiongi is used to help herding zisuili unlike its feral cousins who preyed on the meat animals. It is also known for having a reputation in perversity and pride.
Tsufurujin	Dragon Ball	
Tunnel Makers	Einstein's Bridge	Aquatic/shape-shifting
Tuber	Adventure Time	Cuber's sister
Tusken Raider	Star Wars	Humanoid
Turians	Mass Effect	A humanoid species with avian features. Militaristic, disciplined.
Twinkletoes	Adventure Time: Distant Lands	
Twi'lek	Star Wars	Humanoid
Twinsunians	Little Big Adventure	
Twonkies	The Adventures of Jimmy Neutron: Boy Genius	
Tyranid	Warhammer 40,000	
Tzenkethi	Star Trek	
