= List of fictional extraterrestrial species and races: E =

Name	Source	Type
Earth people (Parallel Planet on the contrary)	Doraemon	Humanoids who are gender-swapped version of Earth people
Eber	2300 AD	
Ectonurite	Ben 10	Cycloptic ghost-like aliens from the skeletal planet Anur Phaetos, who have powers similar to ghosts in culture, including invisibility, intangibility, and possessing the bodies of others. Furthermore, they commonly wear a secondary skin that condenses their form and conceals their monstrous appearance.
Edestekai	Star Frontiers	trilaterally symmetrical nomads
Edo	Star Trek	
Ekhonides	Perry Rhodan	
Ekoplektoid	Ben 10	A humanoid frog-like race from planet Ekoplekton, a sprawling metropolis that continues growing due to their rapid rate their population grows. This high rate, however, is not due to reproductive capabilities, but their main ability: if they sustain a hit to their back, they involuntarily split into two clones that are half the size of the original, but are twice as heavy, dense, and strong.
El-Aurians	Star Trek	Humanoid race of "listeners"
Elcor	Mass Effect	Large, heavy, quadruped. Slow to act, have to directly state emotions.
Eldar	Warhammer 40,000	Humanoid
Elder Gods	Cthulhu Mythos	
Elder Thing	Cthulhu Mythos	
Eldorians	Utopia	
Electrogoomba	Super Mario Galaxy	Evolved species of a Goomba, the species is divided into different variants
Elerians	Master of Orion II	Humanoid
Elites (Sangheili)	Halo	Technologically superior race of military supremacy. Mainstay of Covenant military until philosophical differences removed them from the Hierarchy. They allied themselves to humans to combat the Covenant. Uncertain allies to humans.
Ellimist	K. A. Applegate's Animorphs	All powerful being with no known appearance
Elves	Bravest Warriors	These creatures are nearly all virtual except for Wankershim, who exited the Holo John and became a separate life form. Wankershim, however, then enveloped the whole universe.
Elvis	Perfect Dark	Grey
Elgyem	Pokémon	
Engineers (Huragok)	Halo	Maintain Halo Rings, but are not officially part of the Covenant. Large, pink, squid like creatures. No real threat to Humanity other than maintaining the Halo Rings, which are a threat to humanity.
Engineers	Prometheus (2012 film)	9 ft. tall pale white muscular humanoids, the supposed genetic originators of humankind.
Eoladi	Master of Orion III	
Eorna	Star Frontiers	Highly advanced reptilians facing extinction
Eosapien	Alien Planet	
Ep-Hogers	Perry Rhodan	
Eppori	Harry Turtledove's Worldwar series	An animal native to Home. Its appearance was described resembling "a cross between a zebra and a duckbilled dinosaur" striped in a pattern of gold and dark brown. It was domesticated by the Race early in its history and was used as a riding animal and beast of burden. With the advent of mechanized vehicles, the eppori in Race society was mostly rendered obsolete. However, they continued to be used by zisuili farmers and others for attraction.
Erg	Hyperion Cantos	Silicon-based life forms
Eridani	Battlelords of the 23rd Century	Humanoid
Eridians	Project Hail Mary	Five-legged, spider shaped creature, that perceives world around it using echolocation. It lives in a very high-pressure, high-temperature ammonia atmosphere.
Eschiff	London Wild	Feline Humanoid
Esmers	Little Big Adventure 2	
Esperians	Star Fleet	Humanoid
E.T.	E.T. the Extra-Terrestrial	
Eternians	Masters of the Universe franchise	
Ethereals	X-COM: UFO Defense	Alien with telepathic powers capable of breaking the laws of physics and manipulating other beings (such as humans) to do their bidding. Even through their bodies should not be able to keep them alive as they have no functioning organs (other than their brain) they can still live.
Ethereans	Masters of the Universe franchise	There are a number of different species on the planet Etherea from shows such as She-Ra and the Princesses of Power, including humanoids, but they are not explicitly stated to be humans.
Exocomp	Star Trek	Exocomps were industrial and utility robots designed by the Tyran Doctor Farallon that later gained sentience.
Exor	Abiotic Factor	Categorized by GATE as IS-184-A, an Exor is a bipedal extra-dimensional entity from Anteverse 2. GATE scientists theorized that the Exor is the final stage in the IS-184 life cycle, although it is prone to rapid mutation depending upon its environment.
Extraterrestrial Biological Entities (EBE)	The Event	Aliens that strongly resemble humans by 99%. They have enhanced lifespans, meaning they age at a slow rate.
Exquivan	Star Control 3	
Extraterrestrial Living-metal Shape-shifter (ELS)	Mobile Suit Gundam 00 the Movie: Awakening of the Trailblazer	
Evon	Master of Orion III	Humanoid
Evroniani	PKNA - Paperinik New Adventure	Duck-like humanoid
Ewoks	Star Wars	Small furry humanoids
Experiments	Lilo & Stitch	Artificial alien species with widely varying body types and abilities all created by Kweltikwan mad scientist Dr. Jumba Jookiba. All such creatures are sentient, but were all programmed to (usually) cause mischief until their rehabilitation by Lilo Pelekai and Stitch, the latter who is among them and was also the first to be rehabilitated by Lilo.
Eywa	James Cameron's Avatar	Deity / Neural connection between trees
