= List of fictional extraterrestrial species and races: P =

| Name | Source | Type |
|---|---|---|
| Paan'uri | Schlock Mercenary | Dark matter entities |
| Pah Wraith | Star Trek | |
| Pak, aka Protectors | Larry Niven's Known Space books | Humanoid, with three distinct life stages. First stage: Child, Second Stage: Breeder (known on earth as Homo Erectus), Third Stage: Protector, (superintelligent, could not survive on Earth). |
| Pakled | Star Trek | |
| Panuncian | Ben 10 | A predatory canine species from the planet Hathor. They are able to duplicate themselves, similar to their primary prey, the Splixsons. |
| Parillatians | Utopia | |
| Pascalenes | Utopia | |
| Pascians | Battlelords of the 23rd Century | |
| Pas'utu'ril | Orion's Arm | Six-legged aliens hailing from a large ringed planet outside the Terragen Sphere. They communicate through changing color patterns on their skin. |
| Pemalites | K. A. Applegate's Animorphs | Dog-like aliens, extremely friendly |
| Pentapods | 2300 AD | |
| The People from the Home | Ingathering: The Complete People Stories by Zenna Henderson | Very like Earth people, but have paranormal powers. Some came to live in small communities on Earth, after their own planet, "the Home", was destroyed. |
| Pequeninos | Orson Scott Card's Speaker for the Dead | |
| Perry the Living Island of Insight | Adventure Time: Fionna and Cake | |
| Petrosapien | Ben 10 | A race of silicon-based aliens from the planet Petropia. They were rendered extinct following Petropia's destruction until it is restored with a special crystal. |
| Pfhor | Marathon Trilogy | |
| Pfifltrig | C. S. Lewis' Ransom Trilogy | |
| Phagors | Brian W. Aldiss's Heliconia series | Humanoid |
| Phalanx | Marvel Comics | |
| Phentari | Battlelords of the 23rd Century | |
| Phibians | Dune universe | |
| Phleebhutinskis | Space Quest | |
| Phosphorescent Maze Midgets | Bravest Warriors | Midgets who live in the Lavarynth |
| Phtagurs | Metabarons | |
| Pierson's Puppeteers | Larry Niven's Ringworld and Known Space series | Three legs, armless, two manipulative heads, brain in torso. Evolved from herbivorous herd animals. Most technologically advanced species in Known Space. |
| Pilots | Farscape | Crustaceanoid |
| Pinkunz | Space Quest | |
| Pisciss Premanns | Ben 10 | A humanoid crab-like species from the oceanic planet Piscciss. |
| Pisciss Volann | Ben 10 | Aquatic aliens from the oceanic planet Piscciss who resemble several Earth marine creatures, such as alligators, sharks, and anglerfish. They have a luminescent dangle, the ability to withstand increased amounts of pressure, and the ability to swim at great speeds by combining their legs into a tail, making them resemble a merman. They are also voracious eaters, able to unhinge their jaws to bite into much larger objects and even rip through steel. |
| Pkunk | Star Control | Toucan or dodo-like |
| Planet Duo people | Let's Shake It | Humanoid |
| Planet Jackers | Invader Zim | The Planet Jackers' planet orbits a dying sun, so to keep it alive, they steal planets and hurl them into the sun to keep it burning. |
| Plerkappi | Harry Turtledove's Worldwar series | An aquatic animal native to Home and another delicacy by the Race. |
| P'lod | Weekly World News | |
| Plookesians | Invader Zim | A peaceful race. Most notable of the Plookesians are Mooshy and Spoopty. |
| Plorgonarians | Lilo & Stitch | One-eyed, two-tongued, three-legged, squid-like creatures with green skin, narrow bodies, three fingers on each hand, and an antenna on top of their heads that functions as both a nose and an ear, and turns orange as they age. Their home planet, Plorgonar, resembles the head of a Plorgonarian when seen from space. |
| Ploxis | Star Control 3 | |
| Plutonians | Aqua Teen Hunger Force | |
| Pnume | Jack Vance's Planet of Adventure series | Insectoid |
| Polionation Tech | Sims 2 | |
| Polar Manzardill | Ben 10 | A lizard-like species from the planet X'Nelli with the ability to generate ice. |
| Polymorph | Ben 10 | A slime-based species from the planet Viscosia. They possess complete elasticity and can generate acid. |
| Polymorph | Red Dwarf | |
| Porquinhos | Orson Scott Card's Speaker for the Dead | Humanoid |
| Posleen | John Ringo's Legacy of the Aldenata | |
| Prʔ*tanss | The High Crusade | |
| Prawns | District 9 | |
| Precursors | Halo | Highly advanced, 15 meter tall, eurypterid beings |
| Predator aliens | Predator movie series | |
| Primes | Peter F. Hamilton's Commonwealth Saga | |
| The Prin | Sir Arthur Conan Doyle's The Lost World | Humanoids with red skin and highly advanced technology with a weakness to Earth's atmosphere |
| Prince | Vampire Idol | Vampire-humanoids |
| Princess Zip | Adventure Time | |
| Private Tamama | Sgt. Frog | |
| Progenitors | David Brin's Uplift Universe | |
| Promethians | Rifts role-playing game | Humanoid; formidable ancient race of mysterious origin; reside primarily on Phase World, center of the Three Galaxies; possess "phase" powers, enabling manipulation of physical and dimensional space; generally indifferent to anything that does not pose a threat to themselves or the cosmos as a whole. |
| Prophets (San 'Shyuum) | Halo | |
| Prophets | Star Trek | |
| Proteans | AdventureQuest | Morphing metallic blobs |
| Protheans | Mass Effect | |
| Protoculture | Macross series | |
| Protoss | StarCraft | The Protoss are depicted as a physically strong sapient humanoid species with access to advanced psionic abilities. |
| Prypiatosian-B | Ben 10 | A humanoid radioactive species from the planet Prypiatos in the Andromeda Galaxy. They constantly emit radiation and wear special armor to contain it. |
| Psilons | Master of Orion | |
| Psions | DC Comics | A humanoid reptilian species created by the Guardians of the Universe. |
| Psions | Destiny franchise | Thinly-framed humanoid cyclopes with psionic abilities. Were once a slave race to the Cabal empire, but are now seen as equal. |
| Psirens | Red Dwarf | Shape-changing GELFs |
| Psychlos | Battlefield Earth | Humanoid |
| Psycholeopterran | Ben 10 | A predatory moth-like species from the planet Kylmyys. Psycholeopterrans are resistant to cold, can become intangible, and can hypnotize others via a special mist they expel. |
| Psychons | Space: 1999 | Humanoid with metamorphosis abilities, capable of "molecular transformation" into the form of organic material such as an animal or plant by knowing its molecular structure. This form can only be held for one hour, and they cannot change directly from one form to another. |
| The Puppet Masters | Robert A. Heinlein book of the same name | |
| Purple Aliens | It's Walky! | |
| Pyrians | Gene Roddenberry's Andromeda | Methane-breathing squid-like race |
| Pyronite | Ben 10 | Magma-based humanoids from the star Pyros, who possess pyrokinetic abilities and are immune to high levels of heat. Since they have little contact with other species, they spend their whole lives perfecting their abilities, further detailed in the reboot series as engagement in extreme sports like windsurfing and dune buggy racing. |
| Pyroviles | Doctor Who | Humanoid rock-like aliens from Pyrovilia resembling golems in the form of Roman soldiers wearing Corinthian helmets. They are capable of converting humans into more of themselves much like an infection. Some of them appeared in Pompeii around the time of Mount Vesuvius' eruption in an attempt to repopulate Earth, only to be foiled by the Doctor. |
| Python Lizards | Battlelords of the 23rd Century | |
