= List of fictional extraterrestrial species and races: O =

Name	Source	Type
Oans	DC Comics	An ancient humanoid species and the founders of the Green Lantern Corps.
Oannes	Babylonian mythology	Humanoid
Oankali	Octavia Butler's Xenogenesis series	
Oasian	Roswell New Mexico	
Ob'enn	Schlock Mercenary	
Ocampa	Star Trek	Humanoid
Oculons	Ascendancy	Humanoid
Ogri	Doctor Who	
Ogrons	Doctor Who	Humanoid
Old Ones	Warhammer 40,000	
Olive	Adventure Time: Distant Lands	Shape-shifting service droid
Omicronians / Popplers	Futurama	
Ood	Doctor Who	Squid-like Humanoid
Optera	Doctor Who	
Orandoans	DC Comics' Legion of Super-Heroes	A humanoid species from the planet Orando. Legion member Princess Projectra is an Orandoan. In post-Zero Hour continuity, the Orandans are snake-like aliens, with Sensor being their representative.
Orfa	Ascendancy	
Organians	Star Trek	Energy beings dedicated to stopping all forms of violence.
Orgalorg	Adventure Time	A malevolent primordial space deity who takes the form of the penguin Gunter. He is from an unnamed slimy planet.
Ori	Stargate SG-1	Humanoid, Ascended to a higher plain of existence in non-corporial form
Orion	Star Trek	Green-skinned humanoids known for the illegal trade their extremely attractive females as slaves.
Orion Rogues	Battlelords of the 23rd Century	
Orions	Master of Orion	
Orishan	Ben 10	A race of mollusk-like humanoids from the desert planet Kiusana in the Andromeda Galaxy. They can absorb and redirect moisture.
Orkans	Mork and Mindy	
Orks	Warhammer 40,000	Humanoid
Orsians	Tracker	
Ortheans	Mary Gentle's Golden Witchbreed	Humanoid
Ortog	Star Control	
Orz	Star Control	
Oscar	Tommy and Oscar	Fun and weird pink alien.
Oscillator	Adventure Time: Fionna and Cake	
Osirians	L. Sprague de Camp's Viagens Interplanetarias Series	Telepathic saurians.
Outsiders	Larry Niven's Known Space	
Overlords	Childhood's End by Arthur C. Clarke	Creatures with the appearance of demons that help shape the evolutionary patterns of other races.
Owa	Star Control 3	
