= List of fictional extraterrestrial species and races: C =

Name	Source	Type
Cabal	Destiny franchise	Large, rhinoceros-like humanoids from the planet of Torobatl. Their politics and society are similar to that of Ancient Rome.
Caged dude	Adventure Time: Fionna and Cake	
Caitian	Star Trek: The Animated Series	Feline humanoid
Calamarain	Star Wars	
Caleban	Frank Herbert's Whipping Star	invisible telepathic beings who are actually the minds of stars
Calcinite	X-COM: Terror from the Deep	
Callineans	Star Fleet	Humanoid
Calvin	Life	Cephalopod-like
Caliban	C. J. Cherryh's Alliance-Union universe	
Campbellians	Chōdenji Robo Combattler V	
Canaria	Adventure Time: Fionna and Cake	
Capelons	Ascendancy	
Conductoid	Ben 10	Black-skinned aliens from planet Teslavorr, Conductoids are cycloptic humanoids with plugs on their fingers, prehensile tail, and antenna on their heads. They have the ability to absorb energy and redirect it as electrical energy.
Cascan	Ben 10	Hailing from planet Cascareau in the Andromeda Galaxy, these aliens are very similar to Orishans, being armored humanoids able to manipulate water.
Cardassian	Star Trek	Reptilian Humanoid
Carggite	DC Comics	A humanoid species from the planet Cargg who can split into three bodies at will. The Legion of Super-Heroes member Luornu Durgo is a Carggite.
Carrionites	Doctor Who	Humanoid
Cat	Red Dwarf	Felis Sapiens. Evolved over the course of three million years in deep space, from a domesticated housecat.
Catbug	Bravest Warriors	A combination part cat and part ladybug, Catbug simultaneously exists in two dimensions; reality and the See-Through Zone.
Cathar	Star Wars	Cat-like humanoid
Catkind	Doctor Who	Feline Humanoid.
Cat People	The Garfield Show	Feline humanoid.
Cat People	Marvel Comics	Feline humanoid
Catalyte	Utopia	
Catteni	Anne McCaffrey's Catteni Series	
Cavalier	Tommy & PJ	
Cazare	Ratchet & Clank	
Celareon	Conquest: Frontier Wars	
Celatid	X-COM: UFO Defense	
Celestials	Marvel Comics	
Celestialsapien	Ben 10	Horned humanoids with a body similar to that of a starry night sky from the Forge of Creation, they can warp space, time and reality. However, they are limited by their psyche: their minds are divided into separate personalities that need to agree to do even simple tasks, causing them to remain motionless for long periods of time.
Centauri	Babylon 5	Humanoid
Centrans	Christopher Anvil's Pandora's Planet stories	Feline humanoids
Cerebrocrustacean	Ben 10	Crab-like aliens from the planet Encephalonus IV. They are extremely intelligent and can generate electricity.
Ceti eel	Star Trek II: The Wrath of Khan	bug-like brain parasites from Ceti Alpha V
Chaethe	Kathy Tyers's One Mind's Eye	
Chalnoth	Star Trek	
Chamachies	Ascendancy	
Changeling	Star Trek	
Chaos	Independence War	
Charrids	Farscape	Humanoid
Chasch	Jack Vance's Planet of Adventure Series	Big headed humanoids divided in subspecies.
Chatilian	Battlelords of the 23rd Century	Humanoid
Cheblons	Imperium Galactica II: Alliances	
Cheela	Dragon's Egg	inhabitants of neutron star
Chelonians	Doctor Who novels	
Chenjesu	Star Control	Crystalline life-form
Cherubs	Homestuck	Cherubs are characterized by their green exoskeleton.
Chevanno	Utopia	
Chevin	Star Wars	Amebelodontidae alien race
Chi	C. J. Cherryh's Chanur novels	
Chigs	Space: Above and Beyond	
Chimera	Resistance: Fall of Man	Reptilian Hybrids between virus and host
Chimera Sui Generis	Ben 10	Green-skinned cephalopodic humanoids from the planet Vilgaxia.
Chinger	Bill, the Galactic Hero	
Chiss	Star Wars	Blue-skinned red-eyed humanoids
Chmmr	Star Control	
Cho-choi	Jack McDevitt's Infinity Beach	
Chronovore	Doctor Who	Universe devourers
Chozo	Metroid	Bird-like species. Extremely technologically advanced and spread out across the galaxy.
Chronian	Ben 10: Race Against Time	A humanoid species who can manipulate time.
Chronomyst	Ascendancy	
Chryssalid	X-COM: UFO Defense	
Cinnrusskin	James White's Sector General series	
Cirronians	Tracker	
Cizerack	Battlelords of the 23rd Century	
Clairconctlar	Star Control 3	
Clutch Turtles	Liaden universe	
Cocytans	The Dig	Furry, bird-like beings trapped in "Spacetime Six", a parallel universe.
Coeurl	The Voyage of the Space Beagle by A. E. van Vogt	Similar to a big cat; prehensile tentacles sprouting from shoulders. Feeds on potassium and/or organic phosphorus.
Cognocenti	Star Trek	
Colatas	Farscape	Humanoid
Cole	Adventure Time: Distant Lands	
Cole	Tracker	
Collectors	Mass Effect 2	Insect-like form of the Protheans modified to serve the Reapers
Colonists	The X-Files	
Colour out of space	H. P. Lovecraft	
Coluans	DC Comics	A humanoid species with green skin and vast intelligence. The supervillain Brainiac and his family are Coluans.
Combine	Half-Life 2	An alien empire. Many of the "Combine" seen in the game are humans who have been assimilated or collaborate as brutal police troopers.
Coneheads	Saturday Night Live	Humanoid with conical heads
Control Brains	Invader Zim	The Control Brains assign the Irken race with roles and are the unspoken leaders of the Irken Empire.
Coreeshi	Farscape	Humanoid
Coridanite	Star Trek	Humanoid
Corporal Giroro	Sgt. Frog	
Corvallen	Star Trek	Reptilian Humanoid
Covenant	Halo	Collective of alien species who are allied with each other, Composed of Grunts, Brutes, Elites, Hunters, Jackals, and Prophets. Religious Hierarchy with intent to destroy the Human Race.
Crystals	Raiden	Hi-tech aliens that has control over red crystals with unlimited powers, which are used to power up their weapons and equipment.
Cragmite	Ratchet & Clank	
Creators	Nexus: The Jupiter Incident	
Crescendolls	Interstella 5555	An alien band, inspired by the Daft Punk song of the same name.
Crites	Critters films	carnivorous hairballs
Cryons	Doctor Who	A crystalline humanoid race from planet Telos, they cannot survive temperatures above the freezing point, boiling and steaming in said temperatures.
Ctarl-Ctarl	Outlaw Star	
Cthulhu	Cthulhu Mythos	
Cuber	Adventure Time	
Cybermen	Doctor Who	Marauding cybernetic life-forms. Originally an alien race driven to conversion by catastrophic climate change, more recently reimagined as assimilated humans.
Cybertronians	Transformers	Large robots from planet Cybertron able to change their shape at will into other mechanical constructs, most commonly varying types of vehicles like planes and trucks. Known more commonly as Transformers.
Cybyota	Orion's Arm	
Cyclons	Metroid series	
Cylons	Battlestar Galactica	Sentient robots. Remnants of a civilization of reptilian aliens (also known as Cylons) in the original series, but created by humans in the remake series. Both mechanical and biological flesh-and-blood versions co-exist, with the biological versions in charge.
Cynoid	Master of Orion III	
Cyrollan	The Journeyman Project	
