= List of fictional extraterrestrial species and races: K =

Name	Source	Type
Kafers	2300 AD	Humanoid
Kaleds	Doctor Who	Humanoid, an anagram of Daleks
Kalish	Farscape	Humanoid
Kaalium	Moontrap	Cyborg
Kal-Kriken	Utopia	
Kalliran	C. J. Cherryh's Alliance-Union universe	
Kambuchka	Ascendancy	
Kanamit	To Serve Man Twilight Zone and Short Story	Humanoid
Kang and Kodos	The Simpsons	Squid-like. Green, single-eyed squids intent on conquering Earth
Karemma	Star Trek	Humanoid
Kat Nebulans	Kid vs. Kat	Cat-like aliens from Kat Nebula.
Kariak	Haegemonia: Legions of Iron	
Kats	Kid vs. Kat	Cybernetic, cat-like aliens from the planet Kat Nebula.
Kazon	Star Trek	Humanoid
Kdatlyno	Larry Niven's Known Space	
Keepers	Mass Effect	A bio-engineered, insectoid species that is endemic to the Citadel.
Kerbals	kerbal space program	Short, Humanoid, spacefaring creatures with large cylindrical heads and compact bodies. their hands resemble that of frogs and their green skin is theorized to allow photosynthesis.
Kerons	Sgt. Frog	
Kess'Rith	Renegade Legion	Reptilian rhino-like centauroid
Kett	Mass Effect: Andromeda	A militaristic sapient species from the Andromeda galaxy with dense ossified protrusions forming natural external armor. They consider all other species inferior and abduct them to undergo "exaltation" a biological transformation through which the subject is remade into a variation of the kett.
Key-Guardians	Utopia	
Kheirosiphon	Adventure Time: Fionna and Cake	
King Ghidorah	Godzilla films	Three-headed dragon
Kineceleran	Ben 10	Armored velociraptor-like humanoids from the stormy planet Kinet, Kinecelerans have extraordinary speed, able to accelerate to 500 miles per hour in a second. They can use their speed to generate twisters and also have prehensile tails and sharp claws.
Kisshu	Tokyo Mew Mew	
Kharaa	Natural Selection	
Kherubim	Wildstorm	
Khunds	DC Comics	Humanoid
Khurtarnan	Farscape	Humanoid
Kif	C. J. Cherryh's Chanur novels	
Kig-yar	Halo	
Kilaaks	Destroy All Monsters	
Kilrathi	Wing Commander games	
Kizanti	Battlelords of the 23rd Century	Humanoid
Kimera	Earth: Final Conflict	
King Cold	Dragon Ball Z	Humanoid; Reptilian
Kivar	Roswell	
Kin	Warhammer 40k	Genetically modified humans, dwarves. Species that makes up the Leagues of Votann
Klaestronian	Star Trek	The Federation visited the planet Klaestron in 2339 to mediate the Klaestronian Civil War. (DS9 episodes "Dax", "Second Skin")
Klackons	Master of Orion	
Klaxuns	2300 AD	
Kleer Skeleton	Serious Sam: The First Encounter	
Klingons	Star Trek	Humanoid
KMT 184.05 people	My Love from the Star	Humanoid; including Do Min-joon
Knnn	C. J. Cherryh's Chanur novels	
Koala Bear People	Adventure Time	an alien species like koala and bear
Koozbanians	The Muppet Show	
Korath	Galactic Civilizations II: Dark Avatar	
Korbinites	Marvel Comics	
Korvax	No Man's Sky	Humanoid; machine
Korx	Galactic Civilizations: Altarian Prophecy	
K-PAXians	K-PAX	
Kra'hen	Imperium Galactica II: Alliances	
Krakeds	Battlelords of the 23rd Century	
Kraylor	Star Trek	Humanoid
Kree	Marvel Comics	Humanoid
Kreel	Star Trek	
Kreely	Schlock Mercenary	
Kreetassan	Star Trek	
Krell	Forbidden Planet	
Krellepem	Harry Turtledove's Worldwar series	An aquatic animal native to Home. Their uncanny physiology resembled Earth's extinct trilobites and they were implied to be less evolved. Krellepem are treated as a delicacy by the Race in which special tools are required to break their shells, especially since the Race could not even suck the meat out of the shells as humans could do.
Krenim	Star Trek	
Kriken	Metroid Prime Hunters	
Krishnans	L. Sprague de Camp's Viagens Interplanetarias Series	Green skinned humanoids with antennae.
Krith	Richard C. Meredith's Timeliner Trilogy	
Krogan	Mass Effect	Physically strong reptiloids. Possess a culture of violence and a history with the Salarians and Turians.
Krolp	Harry Turtledove's Vilcacamba	Centauroids larger than horses with tiger-like stripes, heads similar in shape to a jack-o'-lantern with jagged jaws, and have a strong odor that similar in smell to Limburger cheese.
Kromaggs	Sliders	
Kronn	Area 51 and its sequel	One-eyed insectoid. Able to mutate humans, turning them into zombies, cling on walls, and fires some sort of energy.
Kroot	Warhammer 40,000	
Krynn	Galactic Civilizations II: Dark Avatar	
Krynn	The Journeyman Project 2: Buried in Time	
Krynoids	Doctor Who	
Kryptonians	Superman	Humanoid
Kryten	Red Dwarf	Series 4000 Mechanoid
KS-2	Adventure Time: Distant Lands	Rabbit-like humanoid, Y5's mom
Kssthrata	Schlock Mercenary	
K'tang	Star Control 3	
Ktarian	Star Trek	
Kulturan	The Sinusoidal Spaghetti	
Kweltikwan	Lilo & Stitch	Characterized by a large, rotund figure, four yellow eyes, dark blue-ish/purple skin tones save for pink on their front torsos, palms, and faces on dark pink on distinctly rimmed eye sockets, large wide mouths with blue tongues, blunted fangs, and small noses.
Kylothians	Men in Black	
Kymellians	Marvel Comics	Humanoid body with horse's head
Kymera	Fortnite Battle Royale	A level 1 outfit in the Chapter 2: Season 7 Battle Pass.
Kymnar	FTL:2448 RPG	
Kyo	C. J. Cherryh's Foreigner series	
Kyrie	Heroscape	Humanoids with wings
Kyulek	O.R.B: Off-World Resource Base	
Kzinti	Larry Niven's Known Space series and Star Trek: The Animated Series	Felinoid - large bi-pedal tigers. Male: Kzintosh, Female: Kzinrett. Aggressive space-faring carnivores, with sub-sapient females
