= List of fictional extraterrestrial species and races: M =

Name	Source	Type
M-113 Creature	Star Trek	
Macra	Doctor Who	Huge crustacoids who feed on noxious gases that are deadly to humans.
Magic Man	Adventure Time	Martian; after magic seem to have been transferred to Betty, Simon's fiancée, he turned Magic Man into "Normal Man".
Magma	Ultraman Leo	Saber Tyrant
Magog	Andromeda	
Magolor	Kirby's Return to Dream Land.	
Mahendo'sat	C. J. Cherryh's Chanur novels	
Maians	Perfect Dark	
Majat	C. J. Cherryh's Alliance-Union universe	
Malons	Star Trek	
Mangalores	The Fifth Element	Thick-skinned humanoids; warriors and weapon specialists. Considered savage and brutish by other races.
Mantis	Conquest: Frontier Wars	
Mantis Man	Adventure Time: Distant Lands	
Mantrins	Titan A.E.	Kangaroo-like aliens with large, powerful back legs; native to Solbrecht. The character Stith is a Mantrin. Also called Sogowans.
Margles	Adventure Time	Martian; once Magic Man's wife
Marklars	South Park	Orange-skinned aliens with egg-shaped heads and yellow eyes. They refer to all people, places, and things as "Marklar".
Marmosians	Ascendancy	
Marro	Heroscape	Skinless creatures with insectoid social organization
Martians	H. G. Wells' The War of the Worlds	Tentacled and very intelligent and technologically advanced. Attempted to take over Earth as Mars became less and less habitable for them.
Martians	Edgar Rice Burroughs's Barsoom series	Humanoid
Martians	Marvin the Martian from Looney Tunes and Duck Dodgers	
Martians	Premendra Mitra's Mangalbairi (The Martian Enemies)	
Martians	Ray Bradbury's The Martian Chronicles	Humanoid
Martians	Adventure Time	Humanoid
Martians	Aelita (1924 movie)	Humanoid
Martians	Mars Attacks (Topps trading cards) and Mars Attacks! (Tim Burton movie)	Skeletal humanoids with massive craniums and a twisted sense of humour
Martians	Quatermass and the Pit	
Martians	Larry Niven's Known Space	
Martian Manhunter	DC Comics	
Marvelous Man	The Guardians of Justice	Alien superhero; parody of Superman
Marvin	Marvin Marvin	
Marzoids	Invader Zim	
Masari	Universe at War	A sentient race of ancient Atlantians that are human-like in appearance.
Masters	The Tripods	
Mazians	Battlelords of the 23rd Century	
Mebes	Ascendancy	
Mechanon	Star Frontiers	sentient mechanical race created by the Eorna
Medusans	Star Trek	
Meehooks	Fusion comic book series	dinosaurs with fur
Meekrob	Invader Zim	Pure energy beings. Meekrob was set to be conquered by Invader Tenn until she received a shipment of malfunctioning SIR Units giving away her location and thus angering the Meekrob, creating further tension between the Meekrob and the Irken Empire.
Meklars	Master of Orion	
Melconians	Keith Laumer's Bolo series	canine-like humanoids
Melmacians	ALF	
Melnorme	Star Control	
Melotians	Melonpool	
Memory Donk	Bravest Warriors	The Memory Donks are a species of "old-lady"-like beings that take away the memory of anyone around them.
Menoptra	Doctor Who	
Mentors	Doctor Who	
Merseians	Technic History by Poul Anderson	
Merewifs	Bravest Warriors	Merewifs are a race of mermaid-like creatures. Most notably, Plum
Mesklinites	Hal Clement's Mission of Gravity	millipede-like
Methorians	Barrington J. Bayley's Zen Gun	gaseous giant-giant dwellers
Metroid	Metroid series	A creature that, in its infancy, resembles a jellyfish-like creature capable of siphoning the life force of other creatures, using this to kill them. As it grows, it undergoes two metamorphoses, the first one making it similar to an arthropod, and the second one making it resemble a quadrupedal theropod dinosaur. They were created by the Chozo to be used as weapons against the more dangerous X parasite.
Metrons	Star Trek	
Mewmans	Star vs. the Forces of Evil	
Micros	Brain Plague by Joan Slonczewski	Microbial aliens that inhabit the brain and offer their host new abilities.
Microman	Microman	
Micronoids	X-Com: Apocalypse	Sentient parasitic bacteria
Minbari	Babylon 5	Crested humanoids; a small number have telepathic abilities
Minions	Ascendancy	
Minosians	Star Trek	
Mintakans	Star Trek	
Miradorn	Star Trek	
Misha	Battlelords of the 23rd Century	Humanoid
Mislik	Ceux de nulle part (Those from Nowhere)	Insectoids which prefer to live near absolute zero because their metabolism is based on superconductivity.
Miu Miu-miu	My Lover from the Planet Meow	Cat-like humanoid
Mmrnmhrm	Star Control	
Mnemonoid	Adventure Time	Only in comic version
Mon Calamari	Star Wars	
Mondoshawan	The Fifth Element	Humanoid
Monoids	Doctor Who	
Mogadorians	Lorien Legacies	Humanoid, warlike race intent on destroying the Loric and invade Earth. Described as having very pale skin and dark hair and eyes.
Moon Dragons	Bravest Warriors	Moon Dragon toenails are used to make the Bravest Warriors' space suits.
Moonflowers	Hanazuki: Full of Treasures	Childlike creatures with Mood plumes resembling flowers, they live on moons that don't orbit planets.
Mooninites	Aqua Teen Hunger Force (individually: Igninokt and Err)	Pixelated-liked aliens
Mork	Mork and Mindy	
Morlocks	H. G. Wells' The Time Machine	
Morlocks	Larry Niven's Known Space	
Moroks	Doctor Who	Humanoid
Mor-Taxans	War of the Worlds (TV series - first season)	
Morthren	War of the Worlds (TV series - second season)	
Movellans	Doctor Who	Humanoid robotic conquerors; fought a war with the Daleks
Moxx of Balhoon	Doctor Who	Blue, large-headed humanoid
Mri	C. J. Cherryh's Faded Sun trilogy	Humanoid
Mr. Saturn	EarthBound	
Mrrshan	Master of Orion	
Mudokons	Oddworld series	
Mugato	Star Trek	
Mukadil Paejua	Vampire Idol	Vampire-humanoids
Mutons	X-COM: UFO Defense	
Mother Parasite	Zoochosis	
Mutzachans	Battlelords of the 23rd Century	Humanoid
Muuh	Orion's Arm	
Mycon	Star Control	
The Mysterons	Captain Scarlet and the Mysterons	
