= List of fictional extraterrestrial species and races: X =

Name	Source	Type
X-ists	Church of the SubGenius	
X-Nauts	Paper Mario: The Thousand-Year Door	
X Parasites	Metroid Fusion	
Xandarians	Marvel Comics	Humanoid
Xanthuans	DC Comics' Legion of Super-Heroes	
Xarians	Battlelords of the 23rd Century	
Xarquids	X-COM: Terror from the Deep	
Xchagger	Star Control	
Xeelee	Xeelee Sequence novels	an enigmatic and supremely powerful Kardashev Type V alien civilization
Xel'Naga	StarCraft	An ancient race that created the Zerg and Protoss.
Xenexian	Star Trek	
Xenomorphs	Alien movies	Parasitic
Xenu	Scientology	
Xiangs	2300 AD	
Xiao Fengqing	Legend of Heavenly Tear: Phoenix Warriors	Humanoid
Xilians	Invasion of Astro-Monster and Godzilla: Final Wars	Humanoid
Xindi	Star Trek	Humanoid
Xorda	Sonic the Hedgehog comics	
Xxcha	Twilight Imperium	Peaceful arboreal testudinoids
Xyrillian	Star Trek	
