= List of fictional extraterrestrial species and races: B =

Name	Source	Type
Baalols	Perry Rhodan	
Babel fish	The Hitchhiker's Guide to the Galaxy	A yellow leech-like fish that telepathically translates all languages into one the wearer knows after inserting it in his ear.
Badoon	Marvel Comics	
Bahmi	Rift: Planes of Telara	Descendants of humans and air spirits. Large blue- or violet-skinned humanoids.
Bailies	Cleopatra 2525	Machine race that conquered Earth
Bajoran	Star Trek	Humanoid
Ba'ku	Star Trek	
Baliflids	Ascendancy	
Ballchinnian	Men in Black II	
Balmarian	Super Robot Wars	
Baltan	Ultraman	Space ninja
Bane	The Sarah Jane Adventures	Large tentacled aliens
Bandersnatchi	Larry Niven's Known Space	Artificially engineered single-celled gastropod, twice the size of a brontosaurus. Slaver's meat animal, sentient. Agree to be hunted for sport in exchange for currency to purchase mechanical arms. Asexual reproduction, impervious to genetic degradation or mutation.
Banik	Farscape	Humanoid
Bannermen	Doctor Who	Humanoid
Bantha	Star Wars	Huge hairy beasts of burden
Barkonides	Perry Rhodan	
Barzans	Star Trek	
Battle Cupcakes	Bravest Warriors	The Battle Cupcakes were engineered by Danny to fight to the complete and utter death.
Baufrin	Renegade Legion	Insectoid centauroid
Batarian	Mass Effect	Four-eyed pirates
Beffel	Harry Turtledove's Worldwar series	A domestic animal native to Home, kept as pets by the Race. Befflem (plural) are described as having armored hides and possessing stumpy legs despite their agility. They are generally playful and agreeable and make an endearing squeaking noise, but their aggressiveness should not be underestimated: When cornered by another animal, they do quite well for themselves in a fight. Threats include tsiongi and prey include domestic cats and dogs. On Home, there were regulations against letting unleashed befflem run free. On Tosev 3 (Earth), such regulations were uncommon as befflem were much more inclined to do what they wanted than what the Race wanted them to do. They would adapt well on Earth, making many smaller native animals its prey. They also treated human masters the same as any of the Race.
Beings of the Extra Terrestrial origin which is Adversary of human race	Muv-Luv	
Benjari	Battlelords of the 23rd Century	
Benzite	Star Trek	
Berellian	Star Trek	
Berserkers	Fred Saberhagen's Berserker series	
Berubelan	Anachronox	
Besalisk	Star Wars	Four arms
Betazoid	Star Trek	Empathic humanoids
Bgztlians	DC Comics Legion of Super-Heroes	A humanoid species from the other-dimensional planet of Bgztl who can become intangible. Legion member Phantom Girl and her mother Winema Wazzo are Bgztlians.
Biters	Factorio	
Bioroids	Intense Stories	
Bith	Star Wars	
Bismollian	DC Comics' Legion of Super-Heroes	A humanoid species from the planet Bismoll who can ingest all forms of matter. Legion member Matter-Eater Lad is a Bismollian.
Bjorn	Space Quest	
Black Arms	Shadow the Hedgehog	Humanoid
Black Cloud	Fred Hoyle	Interstellar dust cloud
Black Oil	The X-Files	
Blank	The World's End	Robot-like alien species with blue blood that replace people to make them fit their ideologies.
Blastaar	Marvel Comics	Native of the Negative Zone
Blathereen	Doctor Who	Raxacoricofallapatorian
Blisk	Destroy All Humans! 2	Bipedal, armoured crustaceans with a hive mind and a dependence on radiation. Former natives of Mars.
Blobs	Invader Zim	
Boazanians	Voltes V	Horned humanoids, though Hornless variants also exist. Those with horns are considered the upper-class while those without them are considered slaves.
Bolian	Star Trek	Blue-skinned humanoids
Boolite	Farscape	Humanoid
Borg	Star Trek	A race of cybernetically enhanced life forms from the Delta Quadrant of the Milky Way Galaxy. Able to assimilate almost any life form into their collective hive-mind and able to adapt to all forms of offensive capability instantly.
Bothans	Star Wars	Humanoid
Bortronians	Ready Jet Go!	Human-like aliens that populate Bortron 7, which orbits around a red dwarf star called Bortron. They communicate using sound effects.
Braalians	DC Comics' Legion of Super-Heroes	A humanoid species from the planet Braal who can manipulate magnetism. Legion members Cosmic Boy and Magno are Braalians.
Bradicor	Schlock Mercenary	
Brain Dogs	Bravest Warriors	
Brains	The Adventures of Jimmy Neutron, Boy Genius	
Brakiri	Babylon 5	Primarily night dwellers
Breen	Star Trek	Humanoid
Brikar	Star Trek: New Frontier	
Briori	Star Trek	
Brood	Marvel Comics	
Brunnen G	LEXX	Humanoid
Brunali	Star Trek	
Brutes (Jiralhanae)	Halo	Pack mentality humanoids of great physical standing. Part of a larger group known as the "Covenant". They are intensely loyal to their religious beliefs, intent on completely wiping out humanity.
Budong	Farscape	
Bug+BurpBall	Adventure Time: Fionna and Cake	
Buggers	Ender's Game	A hive mind species resembling insects. Invaded Earth twice before being destroyed at their home world by Ender Wiggin.
Bulrathi	Master of Orion	
Bunless People	Bravest Warriors	The Bunless people inhabit the planet Bunless 9 and have no buns.
Bugs	Starship Troopers	
Bynar	Star Trek	
