= List of fictional extraterrestrial species and races: L =

Name	Source	Type
L1Z1X Mindnet	Twilight Imperium	cybernetic-organic hybrids
Lagomorphic Humanoids	Adventure Time: Distant Lands	Rabbit-like humanoids: Y5, Y5’ Dad and KS-2
Lallorans	DC Comics' Legion of Super-Heroes	
Lance Corporal Dororo	Sgt. Frog	
Large Nostril People of Boodie-Nen	Invader Zim	
Largescale silver carp	Star Wars	
Lavos	Chrono Trigger	planetary parasite
Laxidasians	Marvel Comics	humanoid
Lectroids	The Adventures of Buckaroo Banzai Across the Eighth Dimension	
Leerans	K. A. Applegate's Animorphs	A yellow amphibian species with tentacles for arms that resembles a manta ray or frog. They live in the vast oceans on their homeworld, Leera, which has only one small continent of land (originally, Leerans needed to go on land to mate, but technology has made that unnecessary). Leerans have advanced psychic powers, which make them very desirable Yeerk hosts.
Lekgolo	Halo	
Legislators	Captive State	
Lenny Longlegs	Adventure Time: Distant Lands	
Leoniders	Noon Universe	humanoid
Lepidopterran	Ben 10	In the original continuity, Lepidopterrans are quadrupedal insectoid aliens with a sharp stinger on their tail and four eyes mounted on eyestalks. In the reboot series, Lepidopterrans resemble humanoid dragonflies. Both versions can generate slime and fly at high speeds, but are frail and not particularly strong.
Leviathan	Farscape	Bio-mechanoid (artificially engineered, living sentient spaceship. Capable of natural procreation)
Leviathan	Mass Effect 3	Giant aquatic creatures that serve as precursors and creators of the Reapers.
Life Fibers	Kill la Kill	Thread-like creatures that can be merged with either clothing or human beings. Appear to be a hostile hive-mind with the ulterior motive of planetary destruction.
Liir	Sword of the Stars	
Limax	Ben 10	Gelatinous, shapeshifting creatures who are carnivorous in nature, more specifically preying on elderly humans. They are fond of high levels of heat, but are weak to and afraid of water.
Lipul	Star Trek	
Lithians	James Blish's A Case of Conscience	
Little Guys	2300 AD	
Livrai	Joe Haldeman's Mindbridge	
Lizard Doggo	Satisfactory	
Lk (fungi type alien)	Star Control 3	
Llorn	The Haunted Stars	Neckless bipeds who veil themselves and their spacecraft in shadow. Soft-spoken but powerful. Feared on the planet Ryn, whose empire they destroyed 30 thousand years ago.
Loboan	Ben 10	Loboans are humanoid wolf-like aliens from the moon Luna Lobo. Alongside enhanced strength, speed, hearing, and agility, they can see in the dark and unleash powerful sonic howls.
Lobster Men	X-COM: Terror from the Deep	
Locust	Gears of War	Aliens that originate from beneath the surface of the Earth. Intent on destroying humanity.
Logrians	The History of the Galaxy series	
Lohvo	Sluggy Freelance	
Lombaxes	Ratchet & Clank	
Loomi	Space Patrol	Creatures inhabiting Jupiter with heat-retaining skins
Loric	Lorien Legacies	A peaceful race from the planet Lorien, who were almost wiped out by another alien race, the Mogadorians. They currently reside on Earth.
Lorwardians	Kim Possible	humanoid
Lucratians	Utopia	
Lumas	Super Mario Galaxy, Super Mario Galaxy 2	
Luminoth	Metroid Prime 2: Echoes	A peaceful race that worships "Light of Aether." Fight against Ing for control of homeworld. Only a single Luminoth is ever encountered, known as U-Mos.
Lunarians	Final Fantasy IV	(月の民, Tsuki no tami?, lit. "Moon People"); light-haired humanoid beings from the Moon.
Lunarian	Touhou Project	A humanoid alien race that lives on the Earth's moon. Notable members of the race would be Kaguya Houraisan and Eirin Yagokoro.
Lunatone	Pokémon	
Lurian	Star Trek	
Lurmans	Doctor Who	Humanoid
Luxans	Farscape	Humanoid
Ly-Cilph	The Night's Dawn Trilogy	
Lycocians	Star Trek	
Lyrans	Star Fleet Universe	
