= List of fictional extraterrestrial species and races: G =

Name	Source	Notes
Gabri Rates	Vampire Idol	Vampire-humanoids
Gadmeer	Stargate SG-1	
Gauna	Knights of Sidonia	A race of Shapeshifting Eldritch Aliens
Gaim	Babylon 5	
Galactoids	Superjail!	A race of party creatures.
Galactus	Marvel Comics	
Galaxoid	Calvin and Hobbes	
Gallaxhar	Monsters vs. Aliens	Believed to be a space squid, since he stated he was "but a squidling" when he was young.
Galvan	Ben 10	Small, frog-like humanoids from Galvan Prime, Galvans are exceptionally intelligent, especially in inventing and innovation.
Galvanic Mechamorph	Ben 10	Made of a liquid-metal like nanotechnology, Galvanic Mechamorphs can fuse with technology and increase its technical capabilities, and can replicate any technology they have previously augmented with. They live on Galvan Prime's moon, Galvan B, and were created due to a Galvan terraforming experiment.
Gamilons/Gamilus	Space Battleship Yamato/Star Blazers	Humanoid
Gamorrean	Star Wars	Rotund, pig-like humanoids
Gand	Star Wars	
Ganymean	James P. Hogan's Giants Series	Large technologically advanced humanoids
Gaoul	Titan A.E.	Leathery-winged, pterosaur-like aliens. Native to Sesharrim.
Garthlings	David Brin's Uplift Universe	
Garys	Adventure Time	an alien species
Gashlai	Twilight Imperium	Organized as "Embers of Muaat"; burning beings whose metabolism is based on a unique energy-to-mass conversion
The Gelth	Doctor Who	Gaseous humanoids, they can either exist in gaseous mediums (such as gas pipes in Victorian Households) or inside the corpses of others.
Gedd	K. A. Applegate's Animorphs	
GELF	Red Dwarf	Genetically Enhanced Life Form — a wide variety of artificial 'aliens' created by human scientists. Some are humanoid, others are not. All life seen in the Red Dwarf universe originated on Earth, there are no true aliens of extraterrestrial origins.
Gelgameks	South Park	Toad-like with slimy green skin and large eyes. Females are claimed to have vaginas that are three feet wide and filled with razor-sharp teeth. Gelgameks also represent the Roman Catholic Church.
Gemini	Battlelords of the 23rd Century	
Gems	Steven Universe	Sentient rocks that project a human-like form (described as "a hologram with mass"). Gems are not sexually dimorphic but are feminine in appearance and are addressed as women. As shown in the "How Are Gems Made?" short, they absorb nutrients from the ground and emerge from the planet as a fully formed Gem.
Geochelone Aerios	Ben 10	Peaceful, philosophic turtle-like creatures from the planet Aldabra in the Andromeda Galaxy, Geochelone Aerios can unleash powerful torrents of wind from the holes in their torso and control air in other ways, and they are immune to magic and attacks based on mana, or life energy.
Geonosian	Star Wars	Insectoid humanoids
Geth	Mass Effect	Artificially intelligent robots created by the quarians, geth (which means "Servant of the people" in the quarian language Khelish) were meant to be a labor race, but as they became more sentient, they began questioning their existence and the quarians decided to shut them down before they could revolt, causing war between the geth and the quarians. The geth won, forcing the quarians to evacuate their planet. While most geth decided to stay on their planet and try to achieve their goal of a device that would house the entire geth consciousness, a small sect allied themselves with the villainous Reapers.
Gethenians	Ursula K. Le Guin's Ekumen stories) and other races	
Ghamans	Perry Rhodan	
Ghosts	Nexus: The Jupiter Incident	
Gibis	Les Shadoks	
Gigan	Godzilla films	Cyborg kaiju with claws for hands, a buzzsaw in his abdomen, a single red eye
Giygas	EarthBound	
Gigglepies	The Fairly OddParents	Rabbit-like aliens, all of them (both male and female) having floppy ears, a small heart-shaped nose, large shiny eyes, and a round head. They spread across entire planets by posing as the "Special Surprise Inside" a box of "Invader O's" cereal. After they enslave a planet, sell their merchandise, and suck it dry, they blow it up and move onto another planet.
Gill Men	X-COM: Terror from the Deep	
G'keks	David Brin's Uplift Universe	
Gladifers	Dennis Paul Himes	
Glapum'tians	Valérian and Laureline	
Glendaliens	Bravest Warriors	A species of slime-like creatures. After The Great Time Catastrophe, the Glendaliens created a machine to keep time running. After the machine broke down and began looping time, it is unknown what happened to the Glendaliens on the Moon of Glendale.
Gliscians	SCP Foundation (SCP-1342 - To the Makers of Music)	Also known as SCP-1342-3. A species of tri-radially symmetrical beings from Gliese 445-C, a fictitious planet of Gliese 445. By the year 42,412, Glisians reverse-engineered radio technology from Earth's signals and contacted humanity, and shared technological advancements until humans devastated the Gliscian homeworld after the latter's invention of space-time technology. The dying Gliscians recovered Voyager 1 and its contents, from which they were inspired to create their own space probe and record (SCP-1342-1 & -2) to send back to Earth in 1982 to warn of their timeline and offer peace with humans.
Glorft	Megas XLR	
Gnaar	Serious Sam: The First Encounter	
Gnolams	Master of Orion II	
Gnosis	Xenosaga	
Goa'uld	Stargate SG-1	A parasitic race which burrow into their hosts neck and possess them. They pose as Gods to humans.
Godan	Imperium Galactica II: Alliances	
Gollarks	Murderous Maths	
Gonknoids	Phil of the Future	
Gonzo	The Muppets	A member of a fun-loving and musical race who was lost on Earth and later found by his family.
Goola-Goola	Battlelords of the 23rd Century	
Gorlocks	Win, Lose and Kaboom	
Gorg	Nexus: The Jupiter Incident	
Gorn	Star Trek	
Gort	The Day the Earth Stood Still	
Goszuls	Perry Rhodan	
Gourmand	Ben 10	A bipedal, frog-like species from the Peptos planetary system. They possess a monarchy-based society and are divided into two subspecies: Murks and Perks. Gourmands have long, prehensile tongues and a stomach-based pocket dimension that enables them to eat almost anything.
Govorom	Ascendancy	
Gowachin	Frank Herbert's ConSentiency universe)	
G.R.A.I.S.E.	Melonpool	
Grans	Star Wars	Humanoid
The Graske	Doctor Who and The Sarah Jane Adventures	Small Humanoid
Great Race of Yith	H. P. Lovecraft	
Grendarl	Master of Orion III	
Grendlers	Earth 2	Intelligent bipedal species known for their scavenging, hoarding, and trading. Though not a violently aggressive species they are very fond of human blood.
Gretchin/Grotz	Warhammer 40,000	Humanoid
Grey alien	popular mythology	
Grob Gob Glob Grod	Adventure Time	a four-headed deity from Mars, and the brother(s) of Magic Man
Grogs	Larry Niven's Known Space	
Grudeks	Farscape	Humanoid
Grue	Pitch Black	Humanoid
Grunds	Marvel Comics	Humanoid
Grundos	Neopets	Cute Alien who lived on the moon of Neopia.
Grunts (Unggoy)	Halo	Short creatures, mostly used as fodder for bigger creatures in Covenant. Breath a gas native to their homeworld.
Guard	Alienoid	Humanoid
Guardians of the Universe	DC Comics	Small blue humanoids who are among the oldest life forms in the universe, originating on the planet Maltus before moving to Oa in the center of the universe. They are the leaders of the Green Lantern Corps.
Gubru	David Brin's Uplift Universe	
Gungans	Star Wars	An aquatic adapted species. They are masters of underwater combat, are fairly fast swimmers, and are proud warriors.
