= List of fictional extraterrestrial species and races: F =

Name	Source	Type
Face Dancers	Dune universe	
Falleen	Star Wars	
Felysians	Noctis	
Felinus	Soldiers of the Heavens	Opportunistic Feline species that disregards all treaties and agreements
Fek'Ihri	Star Trek	
Fendahl	Doctor Who	worm-like lifeform
Ferengi	Star Trek	Humanoid. Diminutive stature, huge ears, civilization revolves around personal profit. Male-dominated culture, with subservient females.
Ferronans	Perry Rhodan	
Festival	Singularity Sky by Charles Stross	
Firebugs	Bravest Warriors	An evil race of bugs that live in the Firebug hive inside of the Lavarynth.
Fithp	Larry Niven's Footfall	Man-sized elephant-like aliens with multiple trunks.
Flat cats	Robert A. Heinlein's The Rolling Stones, compare Tribble	
Fleeblebroxian	Chip 'n Dale Rescue Rangers	Partially telekinetic shape-shifters
Floaters	X-COM: UFO Defense	
Flood	Halo	An extragalactic parasitic species that intends to assimilate all of existence into its hive mind.
Florauna	Ben 10	Cycloptic, plant-like creatures from planet Flors Verdance who can control plants. They can generate seed bombs that unleash knockout gas or vines to trap enemies, stretch their arms far distances, generate thorns on their bodies, and merge with plant life.
Fludentri	Ascendancy	
Foamasi	Doctor Who	reptilian humanoids
Foralbo	Utopia	
Forerunner	Halo	Created Halo Rings to subdue the Flood, incredibly advanced technologically, but uncertain how far.
Forerunner	The History of the Galaxy (series)	
The Forest of Cheem	Doctor Who	plant-like humanoids
Formics	Ender Wiggins cycle by Orson Scott Card	A hive mind species resembling insects. They invaded Earth twice before being destroyed at their home planet by Andrew 'Ender' Wiggin.
Fotiallian	Star Trek	
Fott	Battlelords of the 23rd Century	
Frieza	Dragon Ball	Humanoid; Reptilian
Frutmaka	Ascendancy	
F'sherl-Ganni	Schlock Mercenary, also called 'Gatekeepers'	
Fulmini	Ben 10	A race of energy beings hailing from planet Fulmas who can manipulate electricity. They invade other planets to drain their energy and sustain Fulmas.
Furbls	Battlelords of the 23rd Century	
Furling (one of the Four Great Races)	Stargate SG-1	
Furon	Destroy All Humans!	Humanoid
Futars	Dune universe	
