= List of fictional extraterrestrial species and races: D =

Name	Source	Type
Daemonites	Wildstorm	Reptilian shapeshifters
Daimons	Sailor Moon	Purplish-skinned amorphous monsters that are forms of life native to the Tau Ceti Star System, who act as minions of the main antagonists of the third arc, the Death Busters.
Dakkamites	Marvel Comics	Humanoid
Daktaklakpak	Star Control 3	
Daleks	Doctor Who	Mutated squid-like lifeforms inside tank-like war machines. Xenophobic and power-hungry, they have repeatedly threatened the universe and are the most recurring enemies of the Doctor.
The Dance	Marvel Comics	Humanoid
Dantari	Star Wars	
Darjakr'Ul	Utopia	
Dark Eldar	Warhammer 40,000	Humanoid pirates dedicated to sadism and depravity.
Darloks	Master of Orion	
Darrians	Traveller	
Darzok	Haegemonia: Legions of Iron	
Daxamites	DC Comics	A humanoid species who are related to Kryptonians and possess similar abilities to them, but are vulnerable to lead rather than Kryptonite.
Death Angels	A Quiet Place	Blind apex predators that hunt by sound.
Decapodian	Futurama	A humanoid crustacean-like species originating from the planet Decapod 10. Zoidberg, a main character in the series and a member of the Planet Express crew, is a Decapodian.
Decepticon	Transformers	Faction of Cybertronians who are opposed to the Autobots. Ill intent for human race.
DearS	DearS	Humanoid
Deep Ones	H. P. Lovecraft	Fish-like humanoids who serve and worship the Great Old Ones known as Father Dagon and Mother Hydra.
Deep Ones	X-COM: Terror from the Deep	
Defiance	Genesis Rising	A band of many different races
Delphons	The History of the Galaxy series	
Deltans	Star Trek	Humanoid
Delvians	Farscape	Humanoid - Similar to humans in appearance, but evolved from plants. Blue, bald, sensitive to sunlight, procreate through air-borne spores.
Demiurg	Warhammer 40,000	
Deneans	Fstar trek	Humanoid
Denebians	Star Wars	
Deng	Keith Laumer's Bolo series	Arachnoids
Denobulans	Star Trek	Humanoid
Dentics	Farscape	Gastropod / Slug-like. Symbiotic relationship, used for dental hygiene purposes: This small animal thoroughly cleans the teeth of the user in a short amount of time.
Dentrassis	The Hitchhiker's Guide to the Galaxy	Dedicated chefs who "don't give a wet slap about anything else".
Derkuhr	Chronicles of Honor	Reptilian
Dessarians	Tracker	
Detrovite	Ben 10	A humanoid species originating from an unknown planet with an extremely high average temperature. Vulkanus, a recurring enemy of Ben Tennyson, is a Detrovite.
Devaronian	Star Wars	
Devastators	One Mind's Eye	
Devilukean	To Love-Ru	Humanoid
Dilbians	The Law-Twister Shorty and other stories by Gordon Dickson	Ursinoid
Dirdir	Jack Vance's Planet of Adventure Series	
Dnyarri	Star Control	
Do Min-joon	My Love from the Star	Humanoid
Do Seo-joon	Oppa, Saranghae!	A humanoid character pulled out this TV show
Dog	Red Dwarf	Humanoid Canine
Dom Kavash	Freelancer	
Dominators	DC Comics	A humanoid species who reside in an advanced, hierarchical society. The Dominators are skilled geneticists and can manipulate the metagene to enhance themselves and others.
Dominators	Doctor Who	Ruthless humanoid conquerors; served by robotic Quarks.
DomZ	Beyond Good & Evil	Parasitic, energy-draining creatures with a skeletal/insectoid appearance. Come in various forms, including Sarcophagii, Spirit-Eaters and the DomZ High Priest.
Doog	Star Control 3	Reptiloid with canine features. Extremely dull-witted.
Doraemon (Parallel Planet on the contrary)	Doraemon	Robot who is gender-swapped version of Doraemon
the Doublers	Stanisław Lem's Eden	two-in-one semi-humanoid
Douwd	Star Trek	
Draags	Stefan Wul's Oms en série	Giant humanoids
Draaknaars	Thor series	
Dracs	Barry B. Longyear's Enemy Mine and The Enemy Papers	Reptiloid
Draconians	Doctor Who	Reptilian humanoids with an interstellar empire rivalling that of Earth.
Draenei	World of Warcraft	Seven-foot-tall blue humanoids with cloven hooves for feet, reptilian tails, and barbels.
Drahvins	Doctor Who	Humanoid
Draic Kin	The Longest Journey, Dreamfall	Giant dragon-like creatures.
Drak	Farscape	Insectile parasites
Drakh	Babylon 5 and Crusade	Reptiloids
Dralasite	Star Frontiers	Amoeba-like meter-tall spacefaring technological species
Drath	Galactic Civilizations: Altarian Prophecy	Pseudo-humanoid amoebae
Drayan	Star Trek	Humanoid
Dread Lords	Galactic Civilizations II: Dread Lords	
Drej	Titan A.E.	Composed of pure energy, these aliens are a powerful force and are capable of destroying whole planets if they see fit. Ruled by a Queen.
Drell	Mass Effect	Reptiloids. Rescued by and serve the Hanar species.
Dremer	Gene Brewer's K-PAX	
Drengin	Galactic Civilizations	Reptiloid
Drones (Yanme'e)	Halo	Flying creatures, appear insectoid. Part of Covenant Hierarchy, ill intent towards humans.
Drophyd	Ratchet & Clank	Intelligent fish-like creatures
Druuge	Star Control	Humanoid
Dubtaks	Ascendancy	A large manta-like creature with many legs.
Dugs	Star Wars	Reptiloids
Duos from Uranus	Space Patrol (1962)	Sapient semi-humanoid plants
Duo Miaomiao	Let's Shake It	Humanoid
Duo Xingxing	Let's Shake It	Humanoid
Durlan	DC Comics	A species from the planet Durla who possess shapeshifting abilities. Left unable to remember their original form after being affected by radiation, the Durlans took on a form resembling a mass of tentacles. However, they generally assume a humanoid form when outside Durla.
Duros	Star Wars	Reptiloid
Dyson Aliens	Peter F. Hamilton's "Pandora's Star"	
