= List of fictional extraterrestrial species and races: Y =

Name	Source	Type
Y5	Adventure Time: Distant Lands	Rabbit-like humanoid
Yacatisma	Church of the SubGenius	
Yag-Kosha	Robert E. Howard's The Tower of the Elephant	Humanoid elephant
Yaetuans	Christan Clines's The Yaetuan Sagas	Six limbed intelligent species
Yahg	Mass Effect	Apex predator species. Tendency to be xenophobic; one individual held the position of Shadow Broker.
Yanme'e	Halo	
Yautja	Predator	Humanoid. Also known as Predators. They are a warrior race that hunts down other sentient races for sport, but follow a code of honor and deeply respect those who manage to defeat one of their own in combat.
Yariru	Vampire Idol	Vampire-humanoids
Yazirian	Star Frontiers	Ape-like humanoid glider
Yeerks	K. A. Applegate's Animorphs	Slug-like parasites. They need a host to see, walk, and communicate, and are the main antagonists of the Animorphs series, intent on enslaving other species.
Yehat	Star Control	Pterodactyl-like
Yengi-Tat	Hack RUN	Earth-occupying aliens in secret
Yeti	Doctor Who	
Yilane	West of Eden series by Harry Harrison	
Yip-Yips	Sesame Street	
Yliis	2300 AD	
Yolkians	Jimmy Neutron	Gooey Slug-like aliens with egg shaped suits.
Yomingans	Schlock Mercenary	
Yor	Galactic Civilizations	
Yorn	Star Control 3	
Ythrian	Poul Anderson's Technic History	Eagle-like aliens
Yridian	Star Trek	
Yugopotamians	The Fairly OddParents	Squid-like aliens with dome-covered brains.
Yuuzhan Vong	Star Wars	Humanoid
