= List of fictional extraterrestrial species and races: S =

Name	Source	Type
Saiyan	Dragon Ball Z	A naturally aggressive warrior race hailing from the planet Vegeta who are, purportedly, the strongest warriors in the fictional Dragon Ball universe. Most of the Saiyans were exterminated by galactic overlord Frieza after Goku was born. With only few known survivors, they are functionally extinct. With the exception of their monkey-like tails, all Saiyans have an outward appearance identical to humans but with a larger, muscular build. They are able to manipulate life energy and are able to sense said energy from other living beings
Sakkra	Master of Orion	
Salayan	The Orville	
Sal-Kadeem	Utopia	
Salarians	Mass Effect	Amphibian species with a relatively short lifespan. Processes stimuli quickly.
Samaan	Star Twinkle PreCure	An alien race who are terminally dependent on a Mother AI. One of them, Lala Hagoromo, became the first alien to become a Pretty Cure.
San 'Shyuum	Halo	
Sandworm	Dune universe	
Sangheili	Halo	
Santeeians	Bravest Warriors	Santeeians worshipped Wankershim before being vaporized to become one with Wankershim.
Sariens	Space Quest	
Sarturians	Utopia	
Sathar	Star Frontiers	Worm-like tentacled antagonists
Sau-Bau	Battlelords of the 23rd Century	
Scarrans	Farscape	Humanoid
Schniarfeurs	Valérian and Laureline	
Scorvians	Farscape	Humanoid
Screwheads	Invader Zim	They were enslaved by the Irken Empire and currently the species works the Conveyor Belt Planet.
Scrin	Command & Conquer	
Scwozzworts	Lunchbox and the Aliens	Squid-like and non-humanoid
Sdanli	Harry Turtledove's Worldwar series	Large, fierce reptilian predators native to Home. In the very ancient history of the Race, petitioners who appeared before emperors (Ssumaz dynasty or otherwise, as this was long before the planet's political unification even by the standards of the Race's history) and did not show the proper respect were thrown to sdanli as a form of capital punishment. The punishment was later changed to a nonlethal, symbolic one: courtiers in sdanli-skin masks surround the disgraced individuals and mock them.
Sebaceans	Farscape	Humanoid. Genetically engineered offshoot of humans, harvested from Earth 27,000 years ago. Lower heat resistance than humans, but double the average life expectancy
Second through Last Men	Olaf Stapledon's Last and First Men	
Sectoids	X-COM: UFO Defense	Sectoids are the first race encountered by the X-COM. They resemble the typical Grey alien, but are quite short. However, they have great psychic powers, capable of linking their minds and inducing panic or even controlling their enemies.
Segmentasapiens	Ben 10	Gorilla-like species with bodies made of building blocks similar to Lego blocks.
Seekers	Advent Rising	
Selay	Star Trek	Reptilian species in episode "Lonely Among Us"
Selkath	Star Wars	Humanoid
Seraphim	Supreme Commander	
Séroni	Space Trilogy	Humanoid
Sevod	Hary Turtledove's Worldwar series	An avian species with reptilian characteristics that flew in the sky of Tau Ceti. Like many creatures found in Home, they had scales and eye-turrets; unlike birds, sevod and related species had featherless wings. The Sevod was renowned for making musical sounds in the evening and are related to squazeffi.
Shadoks	Les Shadoks	
Shadows	Babylon 5	Arachnid, capable of phase-shifting to turn invisible
Shalka	Doctor Who	
Shafter	Adventure Time: Distant Lands	
Sharrh	C. J. Cherryh's Alliance-Union universe	
Sheeda	Grant Morrison's Seven soldiers of Victory megaseries	
Sheliak	Star Trek	
Shevar	Ascendancy	
Sheyangs	Farscape	
Shi'ar	Marvel Comics	Humanoid
Shinari	Imperium Galactica II: Alliances	
Shingouz	Valérian comics	
Shiori Goshiki	A Galaxy Next Door	
Shivans	Descent: FreeSpace – The Great War	
Shizuka Minamoto (Parallel Planet on the contrary)	Doraemon	Humanoid who is the gender-swapped version of Shizuka Minamoto
Shofixti	Star Control	
Shoggoths	H. P. Lovecraft	
Sholans	Lisanne Norman - Sholan Alliance	Feline humanoid
Shongairi	David Weber's Out of the Dark	
Shonunin	C. J. Cherryh's Alliance-Union universe	
Shroobs	Mario & Luigi: Partners in Time	Evil race of Toads who invaded the Mushroom Kingdom of the past. Some of them appears in Bowser's Castle in Mario & Luigi: Bowser's Inside Story.
Silacoids	X-COM: UFO Defense	
Silfen	Peter F. Hamilton's Pandora's Star	Humanoid
Silicoids	Master of Orion	
Sirians	Serious Sam: The First Encounter	
Skaarj	Unreal series	
Skedar	Perfect Dark	
Skinnies	Starship Troopers	Humanoid
Skolarians	Zak McKracken and the Alien Mindbenders	
Skroderiders	Vernor Vinge's A Fire Upon the Deep	Sessile, plant-like beings mounted in personal mechanical vehicles ("skrodes")
Skrulls	Marvel Comics	
Slaughtering Rat People	Invader Zim	Physiologically similar to giant rats, the Slaughtering Rat People inhabited the planet Blorch before it was conquered by Invader Skoodge. Blorch was converted into a parking structure planet.
Slavers (see Thrint)	Larry Niven's Known Space	
Slitheen	Doctor Who	
Slylandro	Star Control	
Snakemen	X-COM: UFO Defense	
Snarks	Marvel Comics	
Snotlings	Warhammer 40,000	Humanoid
Snovemdomas	Ascendancy	
SoI-002	SCP Foundation	Species of Interest #002 is a large, conical, arthropodal species with four legs and six arms, locomoting with self-assistance via telekinesis. Most if not all members of the species are Ortothans; practitioners of an ancient intergalactic religion. SCP-2651-B, a group of SoI-002, died while attempting to colonize the Earth during the late Neoproterozoic Era. In sandbox notes, the species is unofficially labeled as the Aalkjad.
Solarians	Nine Sols	
Solaris	Stanisław Lem's Solaris	
Solomon Family	3rd Rock from the Sun	
Solon	Haegemonia: Legions of Iron	
Solrock	Pokémon	A rock-like Pokémon reminiscent of a cartoon sun.
Son'a	Star Trek	
Sonorosians	Ben 10	Sound-based aliens from planet Sonorosia who live in containment suits made of silicon, they are capable of self replication and unleashing powerful sonic screams.
Sontarans	Doctor Who	Stocky humanoids known for their ruthlessness from planet Sontar.
Soomanii	Utopia	
Sorn	C. S. Lewis' Space Trilogy	
Soro	David Brin's Uplift Universe	
Sosiqui	The Journeyman Project 3: Legacy of Time	
Southern Aliens	Bravest Warriors	They have thick southern accents.
Space Angel Princess	Adventure Time	
Space Chickens	Bravest Warriors	Physiologically similar to pigeons
Space Chickens	Courage the Cowardly Dog	
Space Moth	Adventure Time	
Space Pirates	Metroid series	
Spathi	Star Control	
Species	Species and its sequels	Bipedal humanoid female aliens, and quadrupedal male aliens.
Species 8472	Star Trek	
S'pht	Marathon Trilogy	
Spibbley	Invader Zim	
Spiridons	Doctor Who	
Spirits	Stargate SG-1	Humanoid
Splixson	Ben 10	Small, humanoid aliens from planet Hathor, Splixsons can duplicate themselves infinitely, and are generally peaceful farmers and painters on their home planet.
Sprixie	Super Mario 3D World	
Squirps	Super Paper Mario	
Squiz-Quijy	Utopia	
Ssora	Renegade Legion	Reptilian
Ssvapi	Harry Turtledove's Worldwar series	A burrowing animal native to Rabotev 2. Throughout the Race's empire, they are notorious for showing extreme aggression and stubbornness in fighting to defend their burrow networks against predators and other intruders. The American defense of Chicago from 1942 to 1944 was compared to the territorial defensiveness of such animals by the Conquest Fleet that flew against Tosev 3.
Starmen	EarthBound	
Strogg	Quake II and Quake 4	
Stsho	C. J. Cherryh's Chanur novels	
Stu	Pixar's Lifted	
Sugarbellies	Bravest Warriors	They speak in high-pitched voices.
Suliban	Star Trek	Humanoid
Sun-Dog	Terry Pratchett's The Dark Side of the Sun	Large sentient beings that live in the vacuum of space. Capable of traveling through hyperspace. Any object they engulf will travel through hyperspace with them. The Sub-Dog species operate a successful business transporting spaceships across vast distances for other races in exchange for currency.
Suneo Honekawa (Parallel Planet on the contrary)	Doraemon	Humanoid who is the gender-swapped version of Suneo Honekawa
Sungs	2300 AD	
Supox	Star Control	
Serrakin	Stargate SG-1	Humanoid
Swaparamans	Ascendancy	
Sycorax	Doctor Who	Humanoid
Sye-Men	Battlelords of the 23rd Century	
Sykarians	Farscape	Humanoid
Symbiote	Marvel Comics	Inorganic, amorphous extraterrestrial symbiotes appearing in American comic books published by Marvel Comics. The Klyntar bond with their hosts, creating a symbiotic bond through which a single entity is created. They also are able to alter their hosts personalities, by influencing their darkest desires and wants, along with amplifying their physical and emotional traits and personality.
Syreen	Star Control	Humanoid
