= List of fictional extraterrestrial species and races: J =

Name	Source	Type
Jaffa	Stargate SG-1	Genetically altered humans with pouches that are designed to incubate Goa'uld larvae.
Jaridians	Earth: Final Conflict	Humanoid
James (Frog)	Taro the Space Alien	An alien frog
Jawa	Star Wars	Creatures that live in the Tatooine desert. Their appearance is known to few as they often have robes covering the whole of their bodies.
Jem'Hadar	Star Trek	
Jenova	Final Fantasy VII	
Jezzedaic Priests	Battlelords of the 23rd Century	
Ji Rousang	Legend of Heavenly Tear: Phoenix Warriors	Humanoid
Jile	Let's Shake It	Humanoid
Jiralhanae	Halo	Known more commonly as Brutes. Part of Covenant Hierarchy.
Jjaro	Marathon Trilogy	
J'naii	Star Trek	
Jocaceans	Farscape	Humanoid
Jophur	David Brin's Uplift Universe	
Jorenians	S.L. Viehl's StarDoc series and associated universe	Large blue-skinned humanoid with retractile claws.
Jotoki	Larry Niven's Known Space	
Joozian	South Park	Their skin is dull yellow, with light brown markings and have beady eyes. Only male Joozians have been shown.
Judoon	Doctor Who	Rhino-like Humanoid
Junk squids	Void Bastards	Giant squid-like non-sapient omnivorous species capable of surviving in hard vacuum and large enough to devour even sizeable spacecraft.
