= List of fictional extraterrestrial species and races: H =

Name	Source	Type
H'Harn	Edmond Hamilton's Star Kings series	
Hacan	Twilight Imperium	leonine traders
Haggunenons	The Hitchhiker's Guide to the Galaxy	Creatures that evolve incredibly fast.
Halflings	Dances in the Snow, Genome	
Halfworlders	Marvel Comics	A species of anthropomorphic animals created from being given experiments on Halfworld.
Hallessi	Harry Turtledove's Worldwar series	A subject species of the Race. Singular "Halless".
Hallucinoids	X-COM: Terror from the Deep	
Halosians	Farscape	Humanoid
Hanar	Mass Effect	Invertebrates that resemble jellyfish. Another species, Drell, serve under them.
Hangi	Farscape	Humanoid
Hani	C. J. Cherryh's Chanur novels	
Hanshaks	Ascendancy	
Harammins	The History of the Galaxy series)	
Hardcore Hill Midgets	Bravest Warriors	They are found on the planet Zgraxxis.
Harika	Star Control 3	
Harmonia	The Sirens of Titan	flatworm-like
Harvesters	Independence Day	
Haydonites	Robotech	
Headcrabs	Half-Life	
Headies	Noon Universe	
Heechee	Frederik Pohl	
Helmacrons	K. A. Applegate's Animorphs series (specifically books 24 and 42)	Microscopic aliens with two arms and four legs, they are fungible, transferring their mind to another individual when killed. They are egotistical and have technology that can shrink other species down to their size.
Heptapods	Arrival	Giant octopus-like aliens with seven limbs
Herald	Star Control 3	
Hermat	Star Trek	
Hi-Five Aliens	Bravest Warriors	Characterized by long, single arm above their heads.
Hidetoshi Dekisugi (Parallel Planet on the contrary)	Doraemon	Humanoid who is the gender-swapped version of Hidetoshi Dekisugi
Hierarchy	Universe at War	A collective race of alien species including tall grey-like humanoid aliens, genetically altered beings, and enslaved alien races including the Skinwalkers.
Highbreed	Ben 10: Alien Force	Humanoid
High Ones	Elfquest	Humanoid
Hiigarans	Homeworld	Humanoid
Hirogen	Star Trek	
Hisa	C. J. Cherryh's Alliance-Union universe	
Hive, The	Renegade Legion	Gained starfaring capability after stealing a Terran ship.
Hivers	Sword of the Stars	
Hivers	Traveller RPG	modified starfish
Hobos	Invader Zim	Humanoid
Hoka	Poul Anderson and Gordon R. Dickson	teddy-bears imitating human history
Hoix	Doctor Who and Torchwood.	Humanoid
Hooloovoo	The Hitchhiker's Guide to the Galaxy	super-intelligent shade of the colour blue
Hoofonoggles	Froonga Planet	Ape-like reptilian carnivores
Hoon	David Brin's Uplift Universe	
Horda	Doctor Who	
Hork-Bajir	K. A. Applegate's Animorphs	Large, reptilian aliens with large blades at each of their joints and on their heads. Often referred to as 'salad mixers'. Usually peaceful, despite their appearance, as their blades were meant to be used for stripping bark off the very tall trees of their home world. Over 99% of the species has the mental capacity of a six-year-old human child, however, rarely one is of an intelligence on par with people like Albert Einstein, Isaac Newton and Stephen Hawking; such specimen are known as 'seers'
Horta	Star Trek	Silicon-based lifeforms.
Hoshio (Tatsuya)	Starman: Love in Earth	Humanoid
Howlers	Animorphs (specifically book 26, The Attack)	Artificial creatures with skin that looks like lava, a devastating scream attack, and a hive mind that allows them to share information and battle experience. Proficient in many forms of weaponry, the villain Crayak uses them to exterminate other species, designing them to view killing as a game... until they started kissing every sentient beings they saw.
Hrossa	C. S. Lewis' Space Trilogy	Humanoid
Hrud	Warhammer 40,000	
Hugo	Adventure Time: Distant Lands	
Hunters (Lekgolo)	Halo	Large creatures of immense strength and stature. They are made of hundreds if not thousands of worms formed together to make a single mind. Part of the Covenant Hierarchy.
Hunters	Star Trek	
Humma	Star Frontiers	Marsupials, born female, change to male after giving birth.
Hur'q	Star Trek	Humanoid
Hutts	Star Wars	
Husnock	Star Trek	
Hydrans	Star Trek	Humanoid
Hydrogues	Saga of the Seven Suns	Live in gas giants
Hykraius	DC Comics' Legion of Super-Heroes	
Hylar	Twilight Imperium	large-brained and aquatic
Hynerians	Farscape	Slug-like. The Hynerian empire governs many worlds, some of which have humanoid inhabitants
