= List of fictional extraterrestrial species and races: R =

Name	Source	Type
Raas	Master of Orion III	
Rabotevs	Harry Turtledove's Worldwar book series	A subject species of the Race in the Worldwar book series
The Race	Moreau series	Amoeboid
The Race	Harry Turtledove's Worldwar book series	Reptilian, often called "Lizards" by humans due to their appearance.
Rachni	Mass Effect	Insectoid species driven to the brink of extinction by the Krogan.
Radicles	OK K.O.! Let's Be Heroes	
Raiel	Peter F. Hamilton's Pandora's Star	
Rako-Gorda	Utopia	
Raloi	Mass Effect	Avian species forced to withdraw from the Milky Way due to the arrival of the Reapers.
Ram Pythons	Battlelords of the 23rd Century	
Rancors	Star Wars	
Raptors	Nexus: The Jupiter Incident	
Raxacoricofallapatorians	Doctor Who	
Reapers	Doctor Who	
Reapers	Mass Effect	Large robotic species modeled after cuttlefish. Operate on cyclical, genocidal programming.
Reapers	X-COM: UFO Defense	
Regul	C. J. Cherryh's Alliance-Union universe	
Relgarians	Farscape	Humanoid
Remans	Star Trek	Humanoid
Re'ol	Stargate SG-1	Humanoid
Replicators	Stargate SG-1	Artificial lifeform. Two variants are known to exist, in a small mechanical insect shape as well as full humanoid.
Re'tu	Stargate SG-1	
Rigellians	Lensman books	Barrel-shaped with four tentacular arms and four stubby legs
Rigellians (including Kang and Kodos)	The Simpsons	
Riim	The Voyage of the Space Beagle by A. E. van Vogt	
Rills	Doctor Who	
Rimerunner	Expedition	
Rimmer	Red Dwarf	Hologram-humanoid
Risians	Star Trek	Risians are extremely open and will freely share their planet, and even themselves, with vacationers – a practice known as "Jamaharon".
Robotech Masters	Robotech	
Rodians	Star Wars	
Roger the Alien	American Dad!	
Rogue Simulants	Red Dwarf	Humanoid
Romulans	Star Trek	Humanoid
Rull	The War against the Rull by A. E. van Vogt	
Rutans	Doctor Who	
Ryouko Asakura	The Melancholy of Haruhi Suzumiya	Humanoid interface
Ryqril	Timothy Zahn's The Blackcollar	
