= List of fictional extraterrestrial species and races: I =

Name	Source	Type
Iberons	Imperium Galactica II: Alliances	
Ibs	Robert J. Sawyer's Starplex	
Ice Warriors	Doctor Who	humanoid
Iconians	Galactic Civilizations II: Dread Lords	
Iconians	Star Trek	
Ifshnit	Star Frontiers	Humanoid, meter-tall
Ikrini	Battlelords of the 23rd Century	
Ilanics	Farscape	Humanoid
Ilwrath	Star Control	Spider-like
Impostors	Among Us	
Imsaeis	Master of Orion	
Imskians	DC Comics' Legion of Super-Heroes	
Ing	Metroid Prime 2: Echoes	Beings native to a dark mirror dimension. Some can change into forms relating to solid, liquid, and gaseous states. They have the ability to possess and corrupt both living and dead creatures. Main enemy to Luminoth.
Insects	The History of the Galaxy series	
Interions	Farscape	Humanoid
Interplanet Janet	Schoolhouse Rock!	
Invid/Inbit	Robotech: The New Generation and their counterparts from Genesis Climber Mospeada	crab-like
Irkens	Invader Zim	Green humanoids (usually small) with an appetite for destruction
Isanians	Perry Rhodan	
Ishtarians	Poul Anderson's Fire Time	
Ithanites	Star Trek	
Ithkul	Master of Orion III	
Ixtl	The Voyage of the Space Beagle by A. E. van Vogt	
