= List of fictional extraterrestrial species and races: U =

Name	Source	Type
Ul-Mor	Star Frontiers	Nomadic land octopuses
Umgah	Star Control	
Unas	Stargate SG-1	
Uncle of the Ramen Shop	Taro the Space Alien	an alien who cooks ramen has three daughters
Uncreated	Marvel Comics	
Unggoy	Halo	
Ungooma	Ascendancy	
Uniocs	Schlock Mercenary	
Unity	Superman: The Animated Series	
Ur-Quan Kohr-Ah	Star Control	
Ur-Quan Kzer-Za	Star Control	
Urpneys	The Dreamstone	
U'tani	Star Trek	
Utrom	Teenage Mutant Ninja Turtles	
Utwig	Star Control	Humanoid
Uxorite	Ben 10	
