= List of fictional extraterrestrial species and races: N =

Name	Source	Type
Naalu	Twilight Imperium	serpentine telepaths
Naglon	Doctor Who	Humanoid
Nairnama	Independence War, aka I-War	
Namekian	Dragon Ball	Humanoid, green skinned beings from planet Namek, they are a powerful race, able to stretch their limbs far distances, manipulate a life energy called ki, regenerate, and have highly enhanced hearing. While all members have masculine appearances, they reproduce asexually, spitting out eggs. Namekians can also choose to either split into two different beings or merge their consciouses and bodies into single beings.
Naram	Renegade Legion	Humanoid
Narn	Babylon 5	Humanoid
Nebulon	Homestar Runner	A bipedal green alien. Whenever he appears, he is told to leave, as "no one likes his style".
Nhar-Gh'Ok	Invader Zim	Humanoid. Resembling babies.
Na'vi	Avatar	Blue humanoid
Nausicaans	Star Trek	Featured on Star Trek
Neadlehead	Win, Lose and Kaboom	
Nebari	Farscape	Humanoid
Nebular	Calvin and Hobbes	
Necris	Unreal Tournament	
Necrofriggian	Ben 10	Blue moth-like beings from planet Kylmyys, they possess the ability to phase through matter, and can freeze enemies in different ways, including unleashing freezing winds from their mouth or coating objects in ice via touch. They reproduce asexually every 80 years, laying eggs in nests made of digested metal, which the babies eat when they hatch before moving onto solar plasma.
Necrons	Warhammer 40,000	
Necrotons	Mork and Mindy	Humanoid
Nemet	C. J. Cherryh's Alliance-Union universe	
Nephilim	Wing Commander: Prophecy	
Neptunians	Futurama	Humanoid, with purple skin, four arms and an upturned nose.
Neutrals	Futurama	Humanoid, completely grey.
New Gods	The Fourth World in DC Comics	
New Orions	Master of Orion III	
Nibblonians	Futurama	Small, black and beige creatures with one nostril, small fangs and three eyes, one on a stalk.
Nicassar	Warhammer 40,000	
Niea	Niea 7	
Nietzscheans	Andromeda	
Nihilanth	Half-Life	
Nimbuloids	Ascendancy	
N'Kull	Advent Rising	
Nitros Oxide	Crash Bandicoot series	
Nobisuke Nobi (Parallel Planet on the contrary)	Doraemon	Humanoid who is the gender-swapped version of Nobisuke Nobi
Nobita Nobi (Parallel Planet on the contrary)	Doraemon	Humanoid who is the gender-swapped version of Nobita Nobi
Nodulians	Tracker	
Nomads	Freelancer	
Nomes	Terry Pratchett's The Bromeliad	
Nommo	Master of Orion	
N'Orr	Twilight Imperium	water-efficient warrior insectoids
Novus	Universe at War	
Nox	Stargate SG-1	Humanoid
Nyronds	passim in the works of Zander Nyrond; occasionally in those of his "brother" Soren	
