= List of fictional extraterrestrial species and races: Q =

Name	Source	Type
Q	Star Trek	
Qou'thalas	The Journeyman Project 3: Legacy of Time	
Quarians	Mass Effect	Humanoid, contained to environmental suits. Created the robotic Geth, who later rebelled against the Quarians.
Quarks	Doctor Who	
Quarren, aka "Squid Heads"	Star Wars	
Quintaglio	Robert J. Sawyer's books	
Quintesson	Transformers	
Qwardians	DC Comics	
Qu	C. M Köseman's All Tomorrows	four winged insect like creatures with a large tail (supposedly to manipulate tools). Conquered the space occupied by the star people, changing or genociding them
