= List of fictional extraterrestrial species and races: A =

Name	Source	Type
Aaamazzarite	Star Trek: The Motion Picture	Hairless humanoids that create objects biochemically from their mouths; also known as Therbians
Aalaag	Gordon R. Dickson's Way of the Pilgrim	Nine foot tall alabaster-skinned and white-haired humanoids with a biological instinct for racial-preservation instead of a human instinct for self-preservation, known as The Immaculate People in their language
Abh	Crest of the Stars	Genetically-enhanced humans
Abductors	Invader Zim, Squee	
Abu Chacha	Let's Shake It	Humanoid
Abzorbalof	Doctor Who	Human-absorbing humanoid
Abyormenites	Hal Clement's Cycle of Fire	floating balloons
Acamarian	Star Trek	
Acquarans	Farscape	Humanoid
Adipose	Doctor Who	Tiny, round humanoids made of fat
Advent	Sins of a Solar Empire	Humanoid
Advents (aka Uranus or the Creators)	Guyver: The Bioboosted Armor	
Aenar	Star Trek	Telepathic humanoid
Aeodronians	Battlelords of the 23rd Century	
Aerophibian	Ben 10	Manta ray-like humanoids from the misty planet Aeropela, who can fly and swim at supersonic speeds, accelerate to speeds greater than light, and shoot neuroshock blasts from their eyes and tails to disable a victim's nervous system.
Affront	Iain M. Banks' Excession	
Agorian	Ratchet & Clank	
Akaali	Star Trek	
Akiss	Harry Turtledove's Worldwar series	Very large and dangerous reptilian animal in the mythology of the Race. It is comparable to Earth's mythical dragons.
Akrennians	Titan A.E.	Rat/hyena-like humanoids who apparently do not dream (or bathe much); the character Preed is an Akrennian. The food "Akrennian Beetle Sushimi" is also featured in the film, hinting that insect-like life-forms are also found on their home planet.
Akritirians	Star Trek	
Albategna	The webcomic Not So Distant	Large black-and-white creatures with six tentacular limbs (two for walking and four for manipulating)
Alf	ALF	
The Alien	Satyajit Ray's The Alien and Banku Babu's Friend	
The Alien Girl	Thiagarajan Kumararaja's Super Deluxe	
Alien	The Hidden and its sequel	Parasitic and having the capability to possess its host
Alien Frogs	Taro the Space Alien	An alien species like frogs: James and his family
Alien Husbands	Adventure Time	This species of aliens is Gray, Tree Trunks' five alien husbands
Alien Mechawar	Taro the Space Alien	
Alien Sex Goddesses	Church of the SubGenius	
Alkari	Master of Orion	
Allasomorph	Star Trek	
Amaut	C. J. Cherryh's Alliance-Union universe	
Altarians	Galactic Civilizations	Humanoid
Alzarians	Doctor Who	Humanoid
Amazonians	Futurama	Giant humanoid women. Men of this species have died out.
Amnioni	Stephen Donaldson's The Gap Cycle	Humanoid
Amorphs	Schlock Mercenary	
Anabis	The Voyage of the Space Beagle by A. E. van Vogt	
Ancients	Farscape	
Ancients	Freespace	Technologically advanced beings that were wiped out several thousand years ago. Unknown physical description.
Ancient	Stargate SG-1	Humans from Earth, with a developed intelligence, who in the age of the creation of the pyramids, left Earth for universe exploration.
Andalites	K. A. Applegate's Animorphs	Centaur-like aliens, they have non-poisonous scorpion tails as a formidable weapon. They lack mouths, so they use a technique called "thought-speak", similar to but not quite telepathy, and they have four eyes: two on their face, and two on stalks that give them 360 degree vision. They are the main enemies of the villainous Yeerks.
Andorians	Star Trek	Humanoid with blue skin, white hair, antennae
Andromeni	Battlelords of the 23rd Century	
Angara	Mass Effect: Andromeda	
Angol Mois	Sgt. Frog	
Angosian	Star Trek	
Annari	Star Trek	Humanoid
Anodite	Ben 10	Free-spirited humanoid energy beings from the planet Anodyne, who can draw life from the mana around them. Old enough Anodites can use this manipulate reality, while even younger ones have a strong connection to magic.
Antarans	Master of Orion II	Marauders exiled to a pocket dimension
Antarians	Imperium Galactica II: Alliances	
Antedeans	Star Trek	
Anterians	The Suite Life on Deck & Cocoon.	
Anticans	Star Trek	
The Anti-Monitor	DC Comics	
Appoplexian	Ben 10	Muscular tiger-like humanoids from the planet Apploplexia. They value emotional openness, but this can be a problem since their primary emotion is rage, and they are proud fighters. Primarily, they use claws on their wrists that elongate when their rage increases, but are skilled in wrestling, though are fatally vulnerable to certain high pitched noises.
Aqualish	Star Wars	
Aquatoids	X-COM: Terror from the Deep	
Arachnichimp	Ben 10	Four-eyed, four-armed monkey-like aliens from the jungle planet Arahnascimmia, they have the ability to produce strong webbing from their tails.
Arachnids	Battlelords of the 23rd Century	
Arachnoids	Serious Sam: The First Encounter	Scorpion-like
Aras	Perry Rhodan	
Arbryls	Ascendancy	
Arburian Pelarota	Ben 10	Functionally extinct due to the destruction of their home planet Arburia. They can curl into a ball, much like a pillbug, and are very hard to damage in ball form, and they use this to crush enemies either by bouncing around or rolling over them
Arcadians	Star Trek	
Arceans	Galactic Civilizations	
Arcturians	Star Trek	
Argolin	Doctor Who	Humanoid
Arilou Lalee'lay	Star Control	Humanoid - 'Grey' alien
Arisians and Eddorians	E. E. Smith's Lensman novels	
Ark Megaforms	Noon Universe	
Arkonides	Perry Rhodan	
Armada of Annihilation	Axelay	
Arquillians	Men in Black	
Airlia	Area 51 novel series by Robert Doherty	Humanoid, see moai
Arnor	Galactic Civilizations II: Dread Lords	
Asari	Mass Effect	Blue-skinned feminine humanoids
Aschen	Stargate SG-1	Humanoid
Asgard	Stargate SG-1	Grey humanoid
Aslan	Traveller RPG	Feline humanoid
Asuran	Stargate Atlantis	
Atavus	Earth: Final Conflict	Humanoid
Atevi	C. J. Cherryh's Foreigner series	Tall, dark, mysterious humanoids. Culture progresses rapidly from steam-age to contemporary and beyond perhaps due to their numerological language. Assassin's Guild rather than police.
Atraxi	Doctor who	
Atrocians	Ben 10	Atrocians are a pathetic, short, stubby species who are invulnerable to all types of damage, but can still feel pain.
Aurelians	Advent Rising	
Autobot	Transformers	A machine race that can transform between a humanoid form and that of a certain machine, depending on the specific Autobot
Auronar	Blake's 7	
Autons	Doctor Who	Living plastic beings
Axanars	Star Trek	
Axons	Doctor Who	
Azathoth	Cthulhu Mythos	
Azgonians	Perry Rhodan	
Aziam	Battlelords of the 23rd Century	
Azwaca	Harry Turtledove's Worldwar series	A large stock animal native to Home and used by the Race as food. They are also edible by humans. The Colonization Fleet brought azwaca and several other species of livestock to Tosev 3 (Earth). As Earth plants were not equipped to deal with the extremely economic grazing patterns of these animals, some ecological damage resulted. This in turn led to diplomatic tensions between the Race and the various human powers that shared borders with Lizard-territory.
Antispiral race	Gurren Laggan	
