= Star Control 3 =

1996 video game

- Cover of the MS-DOS version
- Developers: Legend Entertainment; Presage Software (Macintosh)
- Publishers: NA: Accolade; EU: Warner Interactive Europe
- Director: Michael Lindner
- Producer: George MacDonald
- Designer: Mark Poesch
- Programmers: Michael Lindner; Mark Poesch
- Artist: Michael Lindner
- Writers: Daniel Greenberg; Michael Lindner
- Composer: Andrew Frazier
- Platforms: MS-DOS; Mac OS
- Release: MS-DOS; September 24, 1996; Mac OS; April 1998
- Genre: Action-adventure
- Modes: Single-player, multiplayer

Star Control 3 is a 1996 action-adventure game developed by Legend Entertainment and published by Accolade. The third installment in the Star Control trilogy, the game was released for MS-DOS in 1996 and Mac OS in 1998. The story takes place after Star Control II, beginning with a disaster that disrupts superluminal travel through hyperspace. This leads the player to investigate a new quadrant of space, joined by allied aliens from the previous games.

The game features a single-player campaign that is similar to the previous installment, combining space exploration, alien dialogue, and ship-to-ship combat. As a mainstay of the series, the player engages in top-down battles between starships with unique abilities. In contrast to Star Control II, hyperspace flight is replaced with instantaneous fast travel. Planetary exploration is replaced with a colony management system, inspired by the original Star Control. Combat offers more detailed steering and aiming, as well as additional player-versus-player multiplayer options.

Accolade hired Legend Entertainment to create this sequel after the series creators Paul Reiche III and Fred Ford decided to pursue other projects. Legend was selected due to their passion for the previous Star Control games, as well as their experience as veteran game writers from the acclaimed adventure game studio Infocom. They designed the game in consultation with fans, replacing features from Star Control II that received negative feedback. Star Control 3 was considered a critical and commercial success upon release, with praise for its story and varied gameplay. However, the game later suffered from comparisons to the award-winning Star Control II, with a mixed legacy among both fans and critics.

== Gameplay ==
Star Control 3 is a space action-adventure game with strategic elements. The gameplay is distinct from the rest of the series, combining elements from the first two games with new systems. Star Control 3 features ship-to-ship combat, as seen in the previous games. It also includes a colonization system inspired by the first Star Control, with story, exploration, and dialogue similar to that of Star Control II.

Star Control 3 features a 2D ship combat system, which the previous games in the series call the "melee" mode. Two starships face off in a space battle and attempt to outgun and outmaneuver each other. Every alien race has a unique ship, each with its own weapon and secondary ability. Action in Star Control 3 utilizes the same top-down perspective from the previous games, as well as offering a new perspective from behind the ship. The ship controls allow more degrees of rotation, with more detailed aiming, steering, and scaling.

This combat can be played as a stand-alone game mode, offering competition against an artificial intelligence opponent or against other players. Where the first two games allowed two players to play at the same keyboard, Star Control 3 includes multiplayer modes for network, modem, and serial connections. However, several of the ships from previous games are removed, as the game only includes ships that are featured in its story.

The combat system is integrated into a single-player story mode, where the player explores planetary systems to meet alien races, colonize worlds, collect items, and advance the game's plot. The player can use warp technology to instantaneously travel to any star in the sector by clicking on a star map with a mouse, in contrast to the slower hyperspace voyages in Star Control II. The change is explained in-game as a mysterious hyperspace collapse, which becomes the central question driving the player's action. The player must follow the origins of this collapse to the galactic core, where they encounter new alien friends and foes. Much of the game involves dialog with alien races, each with unique personalities. The player can select from different dialog options, leading to different reactions and story events. The dialog screens feature digitized full-motion video of mechanical puppets, instead of the 2D animated pixel art of the previous games.

A screenshot of a planetary system, showing its planets and colonies at the top and their orbits in the bottom-left. The ships supporting the colonies are shown in the bottom-right.

While the previous game had the player gather resources by landing on planets, Star Control 3 has the player earn resources through a colony management system. This approach builds on the colonization system of the first Star Control. Eventually, a planetary colony will provide resources such as fuel, ships, crew, and artifacts. The player manages each planet's priorities, and each planet is suited to a different alien race. These colonies offer the player a convenient way to resupply without returning to a central star base.

== Plot ==
In Star Control 3, the player takes the role of "the Captain", the central protagonist from the previous game. Shortly after the events of Star Control II, hyperspace mysteriously collapses throughout the galaxy, stranding most spacefaring races. For the next several years, the Captain experiments with ancient Precursor artifacts and creates a new ship that can instantly warp between stars, without hyperspace. The Captain eventually traces the origins of the hyperspace collapse to the galactic core and assembles an alliance of ten alien races to investigate the unexplored quadrant.

In the distant Kessari Quadrant, the Captain clashes with the Hegemonic Crux, a power bloc of several alien races led by the Ploxis Plutocrats. The Captain's investigation also reveals an apocalyptic threat, the imminent return of interdimensional beings called the Eternal Ones, who appear once an eon to consume all sentient energy.

The Captain eventually discovers that the ancient Precursors disappeared on purpose, devolving themselves into a non-sentient species that the Eternal Ones would not consume. The Precursors also created semi-sentient robots, the Daktaklakpak, to reverse this process after the Eternal Ones left. However, the Daktaklakpak malfunctioned, leaving the Precursors stranded at an animal intelligence level. The Captain temporarily restores a single Precursor to their full intelligence, who explains that the hyperspace collapse is connected to interdimensional fatigue caused by the Eternal Ones. Before the Precursor dies, they tell the Captain about an unfinished Precursor project, which could harvest sentient energy for the Eternal Ones in a non-lethal way.

The Captain encounters other urgent threats in the Kessari Quadrant. They persuade the Owa race to stop dumping their antimatter waste on Rainbow Worlds, which was preventing them from performing their function of mitigating interdimensional fatigue. The Captain also breaks the power of the Hegemonic Crux, culminating in the defeat of a Crux Precursor battleship at the galactic core.

The Captain finally confronts the Heralds of the Eternal Ones at the galactic core. After defeating them, the Captain finds a way to combine the Eternal Ones' technology with the unfinished technology from the Precursors. The Captain uses the new device to peacefully gather enough sentient energy to satisfy the Eternal Ones, saving all sentient life from destruction.

== Development ==
=== Hiring and continuity ===
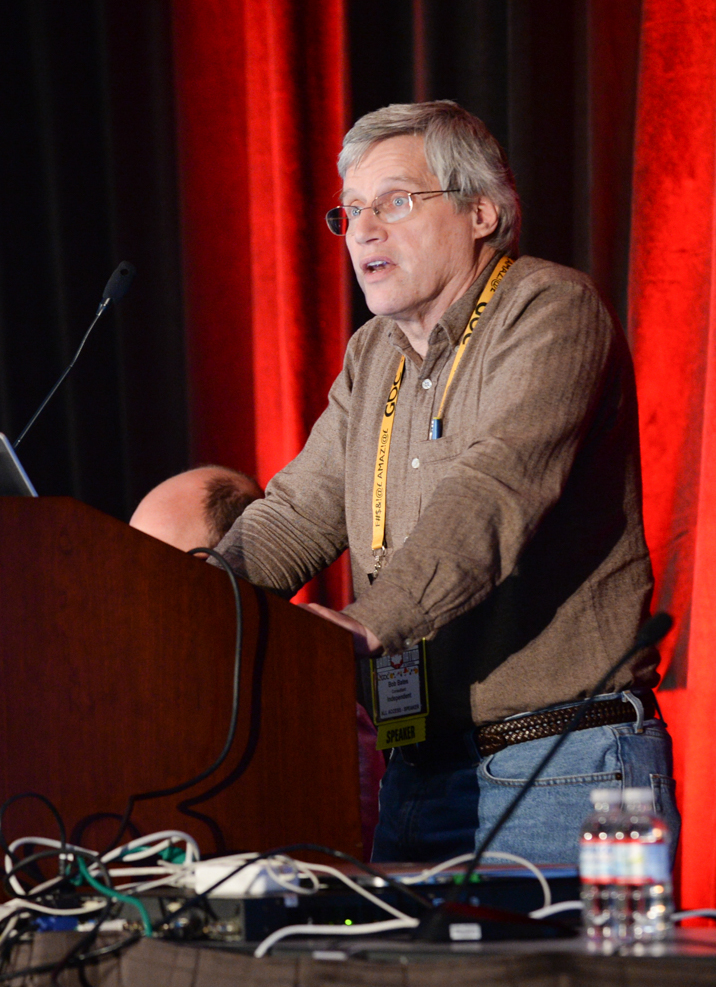
Accolade decided to work with Legend Entertainment after hearing about their love of Star Control from Legend president Bob Bates (pictured).

Star Control was created by Fred Ford and Paul Reiche III and published by Accolade. After the success of Star Control II, Accolade offered Ford and Reiche the same budget to produce a third game, which they turned down to pursue other projects. As Ford and Reiche had retained the rights to their characters and stories from the first two games, they licensed their content to Accolade so that the publisher could create Star Control 3 without their involvement. Producer George MacDonald from Accolade decided to work with Michael Lindner and Daniel Greenberg of Legend Entertainment, after hearing about their love of Star Control from Legend president Bob Bates. MacDonald and Lindner led the game design, and the programming team was led by Mark Poesch. Legend's writers included veterans from acclaimed adventure game developer Infocom, with Lindner and Greenberg leading the writing team for Star Control 3.

To guide the project, the staff at Legend assembled a "bible" about Star Control based on the series' manuals and scripts, with the fan community providing corrections and additions. Fan feedback was actively solicited through magazines and the bourgeoning internet. Legend also consulted with Ford and Reiche to answer open questions from Star Control II, such as the true fate of the Precursors and the relationship between Earth and the Arilou. Legend wanted to continue the previous story while adding new characters and plots, so they set the game in a new quadrant of space. This allowed them to introduce new alien enemies in the form of the Hegemonic Crux, as well as expanding on the mystery of the Precursors' disappearance. MacDonald described the game's relationship between gameplay and narrative, explaining that "Star Control is at its core a giant story, and you have to find this story and explore it."

=== Design and production ===
Early in development, a concept document was created by Legend Entertainment co-founder Mike Verdu. Legend also compiled a detailed binder of letters, faxes, and e-mails, with fan suggestions for the next Star Control game, which they incorporated into their plans. A major target of fan criticism was the tedium of the planetary resource gathering from Star Control II, as well as complaints about returning to Earth to refuel. The team decided to replace planet landing with a colony management system, an allusion to the strategy elements from the first Star Control game. The colony feature was designed to provide a convenient place for players to refuel, as well as a logical location to recruit crew and ships. MacDonald explained that "we wanted a big universe to explore, but we wanted to make it easier to actually get places".

Legend Entertainment depicted the characters using full-motion video of animatronic puppets to take advantage of CD-ROM technology.

The developers were fans of the original 2D art of the Star Control II aliens and were hesitant to utilize 3D graphics that were too mathematical or robotic. However, they were also concerned that the 2D graphics created in the early 1990s were already obsolete. Finding a third way forward, they designed the characters by filming live animatronic puppets, designed to take advantage of the storage potential of the CD-ROM. MacDonald wanted the new game "to bring the visuals and multimedia elements as far forward as we could". Working with special effects company SOTAFX, they developed their character concepts into fully-automated animatronic puppets. The registration points on the robotic puppets were integrated with software that could control their movements. While a few aliens would be created digitally, most of them were constructed in person, filmed against a blue screen, and then composited with background footage of hand-crafted miniature film sets. The team eventually completed animations for 24 alien characters (12 new and 12 returning), which required extensive personnel to engineer, program, film, and convert to digital video.

The developers also added an isometric view option to the combat screen. This led to aiming challenges that required more dynamic camera-movement. They also rendered more ship angles than previous games to support more granular aiming and steering. This array of camera angles and lighting effects proved to be a challenge but ultimately ran smoothly on an i486 processor, as found in personal computers of the day.

Star Control 3 features professionally voiced dialog with a cast different from that of Star Control II, which was previously performed by personal friends of Reiche and Ford. Audio producer Kathleen Bober auditioned talent from other games, as well as soap operas and documentaries, until they arrived at performances that felt accurate to the alien characters. They directed the actors to convey the feel of the characters based on inflection and tone, rather than accents or distortions. The result was a unique voice and lingual pattern for each alien, with over 11 hours of audio created from 18 voice actors. The designers also chose a MIDI soundtrack instead of the previous sample-based module format, as this would make it easier to port the game to consoles (which ultimately never happened).

Star Control 3 had been scheduled for release by the end of 1995, but the game was delayed due to the complexities of all the interactions between the different aliens. The game was finally published on September 24, 1996. A version was planned for the PlayStation, as well as bringing the series back to Sega consoles on the Sega Saturn, but both ports were ultimately canceled. In late 1997, MacSoft announced that they would re-publish several Accolade games for Mac OS, leading to the re-release of Star Control 3 in April 1998. By the early 2000s, the Star Control series was no longer available at retail. Star Control 3 was later re-released in 2011, allowing the game to be played on contemporary operating systems.

== Reception ==
Star Control 3 was considered a commercial success. It debuted on PC Data's computer game sales charts in the eleventh place in September 1996, and climbed to tenth position the following month. The game exited PC Data's top 20 in November. In its initial two months, Star Control 3 surpassed 100,000 units in sales. The PC version received positive reviews from critics. According to review aggregator website Metacritic, Star Control 3 received an average score of 89%, indicating "generally favorable" reviews. The game earned a nomination for a Spotlight Award at the 1996 Computer Game Developers Conference, for "Best Script, Story or Interactive Writing".

Reception

Aggregate score
Aggregator	Score
Metacritic	89/100

Review scores
Publication	Score
Computer Games Magazine	4.5/5
Computer Gaming World	4/5
GameSpot	9/10
Next Generation	4/5 (PC); 2/5 (Mac)
PC Gamer (US)	90%
PC Games	A−
PC Game Parade	83
PC Review	9/10
RPGFan	86%
MacHome Journal	4/5
Macworld	2/5
MacAddict	3/4

Chris Buxton from PC Review praised the game for its combat mode and called it "one of the best games on the PC", with the magazine highlighting it as a "PC Review Essential". Tim Soete of GameSpot celebrated Star Control 3 for its integration of action, adventure, strategy, and exploration, calling it one of the best games of 1996. Computer Games Magazine also called it one of the best games of the year, applauding its characters and story, as well as its improved graphics and animations compared to Star Control II. Writing for PC Gamer, Michael Wolf felt that Star Control 3 blended elements from previous games "with mixed results". While he praised the evolution of combat and story within the series, he also criticized the strategic elements that were inspired by the first Star Control. Overall, PC Gamer awarded the game an "Editor's Choice" with a 90% rating, stating that it "has some pretty big shoes to fill, and it does so beautifully".

A few publications were critical of the game's strategy-based colony system, while still recommending the game overall. Although Computer Gaming World felt that "the strategy module isn't much fun", they were "totally engrossed" by the game's fusion of ship combat, story-based adventure, and character interaction. According to Jeff Lundrigan of Next Generation, both the strategy elements and graphics fell short of expectations, although the narrative and overall variety "more than make up for it". Comparing the game to Star Control II, Barry Brenesal from PC Games praised the addition of the colony system. While Brenesal noted that Star Control 3 had lost some humor and color from the previous game, he felt this was outweighed by the game's broader changes, including its improved game engine and game balance. Italian publication PC Game Parade's Davide Mascaretti also felt that the game had lost some of the novelty of Star Control II, but he still recommended the game overall, especially its combat. Star Control 3 was consistently praised for its combat, as well as its writing and character interaction.

Two years later, the Mac OS version received more mixed reviews. Macworld's Michael Gowan wrote that Star Control 3 was lacking a modern feel, particularly in its action and dialog. Next Generation criticized the port as "obsolete" and rated it lower than the original release, saying that Star Control 3 falls short of other space simulation games on Mac OS. MacAddict still praised the game for its plot and character interaction, despite the game's "outdated" graphics. The game also received four out of five stars in MacHome Journal, who felt that the depth of the single-player game was complemented by an additional multiplayer mode.

=== Legacy ===
Ultimately, Star Control 3 is not remembered as fondly as its predecessor. Despite earning critical praise on release, the fanbase never warmed up to it and some fans do not consider it part of the series canon. In 2000, GameSpot listed Star Control 3's ending on its list of the ten most disappointing game endings, calling it "the final nail in the coffin for a game that could have continued a much-loved legacy". When IGN compiled their 2003 list of greatest games, they celebrated Star Control II while noting that Star Control 3 "paled in comparison". Upon its re-release in 2011, GOG.com noted that fans were critical of the game, despite its excellent reviews. Game developer and historian Neal Tringham suggested that Star Control 3 was not successful at reproducing the successful design of the second game. Historian Rusel DeMaria also explained that fans did not consider Star Control 3 as good as its predecessor, noting that they were developed by different teams. Writing for Kotaku, Logan Booker stated that "no one's really nailed a successor to Star Control II and an official addition to the series was killed off by the lacklustre Star Control 3."

Initially, series creators Ford and Reiche had promoted Star Control 3 as a "visually rich" and "captivating sequel". Years later, the duo cautioned against focusing too much on questions from the previous games, concluding that a "smattering of that is fun, but the whole point is to extend the mystery". Reiche also felt that the new character design lost the charm of the previous game's digital paintings. Kurt Kalata of Hardcore Gaming 101 described the efforts of Legend Entertainment, that "[i]t's obvious the designers of Star Control III had great reverence for the older games, it still can't help but feel like fan fiction. That feeling, that everything is slightly off, is what harms Star Control 3 the most." Still, the publication also noted that the antagonist's goal of harvesting sentience was an influence on the Mass Effect series and their antagonist, the Reapers.

In 1998, a follow-up game titled StarCon was planned, featuring the Crux as a major faction, but Accolade suspended the project to re-evaluate their plans for the Star Control license. Star Control 3 thus marked the last official installment to the series.
