= Battlelords of the 23rd Century =

Tabletop role-playing game

Battlelords of the Twenty-Third Century
- Cover
- Designers: Lawrence R. Sims
- Publishers: Optimus Design Systems (1990–1998); SSDC, Inc. (1999-2017); 23rd Century Productions, LLC (2017-Present)
- Publication: 1990 (1st edition); 1990 (2nd edition); 1991 (3rd edition); 1992 (4th edition); 1993 (5th edition); 2000 (6th edition); 2019 (7th edition) Aka Revised Edition or Kickstarter Edition
- Genres: Military science fiction, Science fiction, Space opera
- Systems: X150 (7th Edition), d100 (6th Edition & prior)

Battlelords of the Twenty-Third Century is a paper and pencil science fiction role-playing game designed by Lawrence R. Sims and first published in 1990. The game's newest tagline is Roleplaying in a Galaxy at War. The Battlelords of the Twenty-Third Century license was later sold by Optimus Design Systems (ODS) to SSDC, Inc. in September 1999. In 2017, SSDC granted exclusive rights to produce games set in the Battlelords Universe to 23rd Century Productions, LLC. Subsequently, 23rd Century Productions, LLC. launched a successful Kickstarter campaign to fund the Kickstarter Edition, also known as the Revised Edition, of Battlelords of the 23rd Century.

== Setting ==
Battlelords of the Twenty-Third Century is set in the year 2279. The territory of the Galactic Alliance, spanning several galaxies, is the primary setting for the game. The Galactic Alliance is made up of twelve races (including Humans), and is run behind the scenes by huge mega-corporations seeking to exploit the farthest reaches of space.

Player characters usually assume the role of Battlelords, mercenaries employed by the corporations to further their business by any means, legal or otherwise. They face various challenges, including rival mercenaries, Rebels, hostile alien lifeforms on unexplored worlds, and the alien race known as the Arachnids.

=== Races ===
There are many alien races in the Battlelords universe, but twelve are presented in the basic rulebook and form the basis for the Galactic Alliance.

==== Alliance Races ====
- Chatilian: Psychic green-skinned humanoids with lumpy projections on their skulls. The projections can generate and store psychic energy that can be channeled and directed by the use of special attuned crystals carried or worn by the user.
  - (Empath): Emotion-reading psychics.
- Cizerack: Territorial matriarchal quadrupedal Felinoid warriors. Females control all aspects of their society and males are used for breeding purposes. They make excellent scouts and spies.
- Eridani: Philosophical methane-breathing humanoids from a rigid caste-bound militocratic society. They follow Kaush-mukal ("Study of the Inner Self"), a philosophy that states that the individual can find enlightenment through performing their function correctly within their cultural niche. The Vax ("warriors") are the upper class; they run the military and control the government. The Tolude ("gentry") are the lesser families of the Vax and form the middle class. They serve as non-commissioned officers and soldiers, technicians and artisans, doctors and nurses, bureaucrats and civil servants, industrialists, bankers, and merchants. The Mudig ("unclean") are the lower-class, who perform the manual trades. They serve as laborers and servants but also provide technical and support services to the military as mechanics, cooks, surgeons and medical orderlies, combat engineers, and other manual tasks.
  The Tolude are the most common Eridani to meet offworld as their function often requires it. Vax only leave their world to go on campaign with the military, work as a mercenary, or perform a warrior pilgrimage. Mudig cannot leave their homeworld unless they are on campaign with the military; those who show great bravery and self-sacrifice are adopted by a childless Tolude family or allowed to marry into the Tolude caste.
  - ("Swordsaint"): Elite ascetic warrior-adepts (Mokaba Datu; "Wisdom Warriors") who train in the use of sacred bladed weapons and firearms in order to achieve enlightenment through Goyoo Mabiki ("Silent Peace"; meditation).
  - (Buddon Priest): Retired warriors who, after finding Rota Mabiki ("Supreme Peace"; enlightenment), have ascended to becoming teachers and philosophers. Senior priests serve as religious commissars, staff officers, and generals in the Eridani armed forces.
- Gen-Human: Genetically modified cloned Humans.
  After the Second Holocaust, the Human race had a low birth rate. Genetic research was used to ensure fertilization and edit out non-beneficial traits like mutations, diseases, and disorders in-vitro. This led to the ability to pre-select which positive traits a child would inherit (or insert new traits). Then biomedical corporations began breeding vat-grown genetically enhanced human clones to serve as loyal bodyguards, servants, and playthings for wealthy Humans. This was later expanded to supply semi-skilled or skilled workers for corporations and soldiers for the military, which began preferring them to Humans.
  Human frustration and fear gave way to bigotry. This led to the Gen Wars in 2075 AD, in which Human Supremacy groups and angry or panicked mobs attacked and killed real or suspected Gen-Humans. The Gen-Humans and their supporters fought back and a bloody stalemate occurred.
  This lasted until 2083 AD, when the United Earth government created the Genetics Laws. It set the Gen-Human population at no more than 15% of the total Human population and created Human quotas and Gen-Human limits for all jobs and professions. It also forced Gen-Humans to be registered; the manufacturer's symbol, model name and serial number barcode is imprinted on their body and encoded in their DNA "junk genes" to aid in identification. In return, Gen-Humans were considered a sentient race rather than property and they were extended similar rights to other sapient beings.
  Although superior to baseline humans, Gen-Humans are treated as second-class citizens by Humans, who view them as unsettling "things" rather than real "people". However, their superior abilities mean that they often hold high offices in the Alliance or major corporations. Because all Gen-Humans of the same model are identical, they tend to develop identity problems. To combat this, they develop quirks or unique identifiers to separate themselves from the others. Gen-Humans of the same model have difficulty forming large social groups because of this.
  Gen-Humans tend to breed true. If two Gen-Humans breed, their offspring will be one parent's genotype. Even if they marry Humans, their offspring will be the same model as themselves. This lack of genetic diversity is seen as an evolutionary weakness.
- Human: Baseline Humans.
  A worldwide nuclear war at the dawn of Earth's 21st Century (dubbed the "Second Holocaust") killed 3 billion Humans worldwide and damaged Earth's climate with a "nuclear winter". A Mutzachan scout ship drawn to the high radiation readings made first contact with some survivors. A rescue mission used high technology to stabilize the environment in exchange for the rights to extract the radioactive waste left behind at the impact craters. Eventually terraforming technology restored the planet, but most Humans who were able to had already left for the stars.
  Humans, like most emigre communities, feel a nostalgic connection for the place they are from, but few actually want to go back. Pacifism is a popular and widespread belief-system due to the Second Holocaust; however, few Humans are total pacifists and most see it as a philosophy rather than a way of life. They also have a sort of "Manifest Destiny" belief that they are destined to control the Alliance someday because of their unique qualities; the other Alliance races think this belief is adorable.
- I-Bot (Intelligent Robot): Artificially intelligent Androids that can be made to mimic any known lifeform. Although fears of "rogue" I-Bots are common fodder for tri-v dramas, they are programmed to be loyal to the corporation that owns them and to the Alliance. (The former loyalty disturbingly outranks that of the latter).
  I-Bots have poor intuition, relying on rigid pre-programmed tactics or protocols to deal with problems. Unforeseen problems or multiple potential actions force the I-Bot to pause to analyze the situation and decide on the best option. I-Bots who are damaged have to be repaired and cannot heal on their own. Artificial intelligences are not considered true lifeforms by the Alliance and are therefore considered the property of the corporation or organization that purchased them.
  They usually perform jobs that are too hazardous or dangerous for sentient beings and require specialized knowledge or training, super-strength, and precise reflexes (like starcraft crew, powerplant maintenance, scientific research, star-mapping and planetary exploration, etc.). On the other hand, some hazardous tasks like war and colonization are best done using cheap fleshy beings rather than expensive machines.
- Mazian: Amorphous shape-shifter.
- Mutzachan: Small inquisitive frail psychic energy-wielding super-geniuses who tend to become addicted to the energy they manipulate. They would be labeled as megalomaniacs if they weren't actually as powerful as they say they are. They are from the planet Trishmag of the 61 Cygni A star system in the Cygnus constellation of the Milky Way galaxy.
  - (Energy Controllers): The Energy Controllers have the innate ability to manipulate energy forms and can use these forms to generate tremendous amounts of power. They love energy in its raw, uncorrupted form and view the storage of energy as useless.
- Orion: Humanoids that have pointed ears and seven fingers on each hand. They are thrill-seeking hedonists with very flexible moral and social codes.
  - (Rogue) Scheming and cunning tricksters and petty criminals who belong to decentralized nomadic clans. Most Orions encountered off-world will be Rogues.
- Phentari: Haughty and treacherous methane-breathing four-armed Cephalapoid warriors. Their brains are controlled by different lobes, each with its own personality, abilities and interpretation of reality. One main lobe will control the brain for regular day-to-day activities while other more specialized lobes will take over for tasks like combat and self-defense, learning and training, reasoning and problem solving, etc. They are carnivores that prefer to eat sentient animals and sapient beings; Humans are considered a delicacy. Phentari are indigenous to the arctic methane planet Phena in the Tau Ceti star system.
- Python Lizard: Large, strong, and agile Amphibian warriors. Rather clueless. They are indigenous to the planets Pythos and Ashira of the Floridian star system.
- Ram Python: Huge, brutishly strong Reptilian shock-troopers. Extremely dumb.
- Zen Rigeln: Beloved pacifistic biokinetic healers who belong to an extremely traditional and ritualistic society.

==== Additional Player Races ====
===== Hostile =====
The following races are hostile to the Alliance.

- Aeodronian: Cunning bipedal Urodelate amphibians. They can regenerate lost digits and limbs. They prefer damp or humid environments, as dry environments causes their skin to become flaky and cracked.
  Their original homeworld suffered a catastrophe that made it unable to support life, so they colonized new planets. They are fanatically environmentalist, so they trade or raid for all the resources they need. They are rather hypocritical, as they despise other races for abusing their own planets, yet see nothing wrong with polluting, exploiting, or damaging the ecosystems of alien-controlled worlds.
  The planet is ruled by a militocracy made up of 26 Clans. Each Clan is ruled by a leader selected from the premier raiders, warlords, and merchants of each Clan. Over them is an annually elected ruler (Athyan, or "All-lord") assisted by a council of advisers (Inbaltho, or "Many Eyes") made up of former rulers. Each Clan has its own military and they compete to see which Clan will bring home the most plunder.
- Fott: Synthetic xenophobic and sociopathic Leporoid rednecks. They were created by scientific polymath genius, self-made gagillionaire, and super-terrorist "Uncle Ernie" Freiberg to stymie Alliance law. They fit the definition of a sapient race rather than a bio-weapon, making it illegal to contain them, sterilize them, or wipe them out. Fott are curious, reckless, aggressive, reproduce rapidly, and have a strange sense of entitled superiority over other races - sort of a mean parody of Humans. Other races view them as the perfect minority group - obnoxious, dim-witted, lazy, violent, oversexed, wasteful, crude, reactionary and anti-social.
  Uncle Ernie seeded the race on Delphix-9 of the Netas Hydri star system in the And-3 galaxy, just as it was declared Alliance space but before it could be settled. When the Alliance first tried to colonize the planet, the Fott initiated a guerrilla war with them. Settlements were under constant siege and a war of attrition began. An Alliance fleet was dispatched to eradicate the Fott from orbit, but Human and Zen ambassadors were able to negotiate a conference that led to the Fott surrendering after signing a treaty. The Alliance set up an agency called the Fott Welfare Administration (FWA) whose purpose is to educate, house, care for and feed its clients until they are judged able to be fully assimilated into Alliance society.
  The Fott resent the Alliance and resist any attempt to govern or control them. They are organized in extended family-based social groups called Kin. Kins will feud with each other but will unite against non-Fott enemies. Fott live in rural agrarian communes in which they own the land and automated machines, subjugated laborers, and domesticated animals farm it for them. The Fott have resisted any attempts to get them to liberate their workforce and have threatened a civil war if the matter is pushed too far.
  Fott are omnivores who love to hunt; if an animal is inedible, they will hunt it for sport. Fott display their hunting prowess by either stuffing and mounting the bodies of their prey or making craft items and furniture out of them. These trophies are displayed in their living quarters in a special area called a "den". They collect firearms, preferring gunpowder-based projectile weapons because they require great skill to use and it is easier to recover usable prey after a kill. Some Fott hunters use archaic projectile weapons like crossbows, slingshots, or muskets to make it more challenging.
  Fott often find work as mercenaries because it allows them to legally work out their aggressions on outsiders and blow things up while they get paid to do it. Fott mercenaries will often collect and trade trophies like enemy weapons, spent ammo casings or power cores, dud or defused munitions, etc.; they often learn everything they can about the objects they collect. Since Fott are furry, there is an aversion to using flame-throwers or energy weapons.
- Kizanti: A humanoid race that developed on Ferron, a world in the Karanies star system in the Fornax galaxy. Kizanti have mesomorphic builds, red eyes with black oval-shaped pupils, and no earlobes. Kizanti hate the Phentari and fought a war with them once that almost wiped the Phentari out. They dislike the Alliance for intervening and protecting the Phentari.
  Ferron is a "Shade World", a cross-dimensional planet in and out of phase with our dimension. As a side-effect of their evolution, the Kizanti have learned to dimensionally "displace" themselves, making themselves invisible and intangible at will. They carry a ritual marker they are attuned to that they leave behind while phasing to help center themselves for the return jump. This can be anything from a "pet rock" to a 1963 Pontiac Tempest.
  The Kizanti were originally a primitive race of hunter/gatherers. They were protected by the Shade effect, which hid their world from outsiders. A Phentari expedition to the Karanies system discovered the world when it was in-phase and conquered and enslaved the population. Before they left, they massacred them so they couldn't tell Alliance authorities about their actions - a time called the Great Carnage by the survivors. Afterwards, a survival of the fittest mentality took over the race, which weeds out weak offspring so that only "true" Kizanti can live to pass on their genes. They spend their lives training as warriors and assassins, with little time for leisure activities. They have unknown patrons that provide training and support - probably in exchange for their services.
  The Kizanti favor aggressive or provocative clothing that is designed to attract attention. They are adept at many types of weapons, but prefer using ritual high-quality bladed weapons that are covered in richly inlaid engravings (especially when killing Phentari). Warriors wear their hair in a short, stiff mohawk to indicate their status. Kizanti assassins have prosthetic earlobes, implanted contact lenses, and wear their hair long so they can pass for Human. Although the Kizanti have no unified racial language (speaking one of many regional languages with local dialects instead) and have no indigenous written language, they speak and read a form of Eridani as a common tongue (taught to them by their hidden patrons, no doubt).
- Tza Zen Rigeln: A Zen Rigeln cult of feared rogue biokinetic sadists who often use their culture's good reputation to lure victims and fool the authorities.
- Zzzwhirr: An insectoid race allied with the Rebellion.

===== Neutral =====
The following races are seen as neutral to the Alliance.

- Andromeni: Beings of a dying race whose homeworld is contaminated by an energy-based plague. They are under quarantine to prevent the spread of the plague.
  - (Energy Vampires) Some infected by the plague have the power to take on an energy form. In this form they can possess the physical bodies of material beings and feed off of them. Benign Vampires use the bodies of the newly dead or mindless lifeforms, while selfish Vampires use the bodies of living sentients.
- Frekk (introduced as a playtest race)
- Goola Goola: Hairy purple-skinned technophilic dwarves. Usually ill-tempered and rude unless they are engaged in analyzing or repairing technology. They tend to appear selfish and callous about the suffering of others. Their survival instincts promote their wellbeing above that of others and keeps them from "distractions" like pity and empathy that would interfere with that drive. They are scavenger omnivores from a planet that has a hostile environment full of predators. This slowed their technological development, but bred a fascination with toolmaking and technology as survival aids. Not long after they achieved spacetravel, an unknown advanced alien race attacked their homeworld and almost wiped out their entire race; this inflamed their instinctual distrust of strangers into full-blown xenophobia. Goola-Goola encountered offworld are usually trying to acquire high technology and bring it back for the defense of their people.
- Jezzadei: A race of peaceful scholarly Bovinoids.
  They can store psychic power effects in "enchanted" talisman-objects called a Bi-Athlon by using attuned ritual wands or staves called Atohk ("life staff"). Some large Atohks have compartments to contain Bi-Athlons to allow them to store and use psychic powers.
  - (Jezzadeic Scholar) Researchers, artificers, and scientists that focus on their area of interest. They delight in finding similarities and differences between cultures they encounter, discovering something new, or rediscovering something old. Few are met off-world because the average Scholar is rather too reclusive or obsessive to travel widely.
  - (Jezzadeic Priest) Missionaries that travel the universe using their psychic healing powers to help others. They want to spread their culture's pacifist pantheistic religion. Most Jezzadei encountered off-planet will be missionaries, as they are the most common group allowed to travel.
- Misha: Frail, transparent humanoids with delicate crystalline bones. They sleep for long periods of time and are otherwise in a semi-conscious "sleepwalking" state. No Misha have ever been encountered in a fully conscious state.
  - (Dream Merchant) They can enter a psychic "Dream State", where they can perceive potential futures or manipulate a particular future into being.

===== Friendly =====
The following races are seen as friendly or are seeking Protectorate status.

- Ashanti: Slender, grey-skinned four-armed warriors; they have elongated skulls and flat faces. They show emotion through pheromones rather than facial expressions. Ashanti also have a gestalt "sixth-sense" that allows a group of Ashanti to perceive objects in their environment through their linked perceptions; a squad of Ashanti arranged in a circle can use it to see everything in a 360° panorama.
- Furbl: Furry absent-minded brachiating mammals known for their agility. Once thought of as clever pets by the Orions, they were freed and given race status when they were discovered to be sapient by the Alliance. They are usually found serving in a technical or skilled manual trade like mechanic or cook, as the Orions traditionally used to use them for household servants.
  Furbls like to steal objects or pick the pockets of a friend or co-worker as part of a ritual game they picked up from watching and studying the Orions. This is not done for gain but for fun or sport. If the item is returned after their mark discovers that it is missing, the Furbl scores a point. If the mark prevents the theft or catches the Furbl in the act, the mark scores a point.
- Gemini: Large, burly silicon-based rocky-skinned psychic humanoids that follow a philosophy that reveres all life. Normally pacifistic, they can be overcome with anger or even berserk rage by acts that harm the environment or threaten living things in their ecosystem.
- Ikrini: Humanoids with psychic powers tied to natural forces. They originated on Liara in the Crab Nebula but their homeworld was damaged by Arachnid infestations, forcing many to be refugees.
  - (Geomancer): Psychics who can tap into the kinetic power of natural forces like volcanos, waterfalls, and storms.
- Tann: Tripedal humanoids from a feudalistic matriarchal theocratic monarchy led by their Queen. Cybernetics are considered holy and are granted after the child undergoes divination to determine their caste. The Tann live underground in huge labyrinth-cities.
  - Tanndai (Techknight) The warrior caste of the Tann, the caste most often encountered offworld. They are programmed to be fiercely loyal to the Tann race and their Queen. Tanndai serve in color-coded military corps. They may not attack or harm members of the same corps but may fight those of rival corps. They may only kill Tanndai from rival corps in combat during wartime.
    They are usually loaned out as mercenaries or serve in other races' armies to gain experience, test current or theoretical Tann military doctrines, or learn the doctrines of other races. The Tann sometimes send military advisers or aid to a losing faction in a war or fight on both sides just to test their theories.

==== Non-Player Races ====
- Arachnids: A race of hostile spider-like aliens. They have four walking limbs, two manipulator limbs (near the mouth), and two spinning limbs that shoot strands or globs of spidersilk. They are rumored to use captive lifeforms for food or to incubate their eggs.
- Krakeds: Large arthropods that were initially confused with the Arachnids upon First Contact. They are in a tentative truce with the Alliance. (introduced as a playtest NPC race).
- Sye-Men: Cryptic humanoids with powerful healing powers; they can even bring back the dead if they deem it worthwhile or important. They have hideous, rotting bodies bound in wrappings and covered in a hooded long robe called a newile to hide their appearance from other races. They are very cagey about their origin, claiming to be either from the future or another reality. Staying in this time and space and using their powers puts constant strain on their bodies and causes the decomposition they suffer from. The Zen-Rigeln resent the Sye-Men, calling them a mockery of everything their culture stands for and deem them a potential threat to the Alliance; the Sye-Men in return neither confirm or deny these assertions.
- Xarians: Hexapedal, flat-bodied amphibians with bumpy, moist skin; they have been described as looking like "bumpy, slimy endtables". The first two pairs of legs are also used as hand-like manipulators; all six legs are fully rotational. They speak and eat with a long thin mouth mounted between the first set of legs and have a long tri-forked tongue that can be used as a manipulator for delicate work or to grasp or strike far-off objects. They have four small eyes along the front of their bodies above their mouth. They wear clothing made of "t-cloth" that keeps their skin from drying out. They store oxygen in the bumps on their skin and can use them to float in water. The Xarians are merchants; their society is divided into oligarchical clans called Confederations, each of which is ruled by the richest and oldest member of that Confederation. The head of the most powerful Confederation serves as the "CEO" and heads the alliance of confederations called the Hegemony. Their ambition is to destroy or subjugate the Alliance, which they see as a competitor and business rival.

=== Locations ===
The Galactic Alliance spans portions of several galaxies, including the Milky Way, Andromeda, Fornax, Spirax, M32, and the Magellanic Clouds. Details of two 'sectors' of the Fornax Galaxy are presented in the planetary atlas supplements, No Man's Land and Hell's Kitchen.

== System ==
Battlelords of the Twenty-Third Century features a d100 (percentile) based system for resolving combat and skill checks.

=== Character Statistics and Skills ===
Each character has eight Vital Statistics scores (Strength, Manual Dexterity, Intelligence Quotient, Agility, Constitution, Aggression, Intuition, and Charisma). These are used to calculate the four Secondary Statistics scores (Knowledge, Military Leadership, Persuasion, and Bargaining). These scores are significantly influenced by the character's race. There are no character classes or character levels in Battlelords of the Twenty-Third Century; the system is skill-based, with skills being increased with experience earned. Some races have "matrix abilities" (psionics) which can also be advanced with character experience, while other races are more suited for physical combat or other occupations.

=== Growing Up ===
Battlelords of the Twenty-Third Century features a detailed character generation process called I Was Just Growing Up (IWJGU). It not only encompasses the eight Vital Statistics and four Secondary Statistics, which are generated using d100 (percentile) dice, but allows for determining events from the characters past. These are a mix of good and bad; granting a character several thousand credits worth of equipment or horribly maiming them. They are featured in several tables including a racial specific table and a job specific table which is chosen by the player.

=== Combat ===
Combat is resolved through the use of d100 attack rolls and detailed hit location tables; futuristic armor systems and massive critical hits feature prominently. Actions are resolved in half actions (1 second each) and full actions (3 seconds each). Each character can perform two half actions or one full action in a 3-second round. These include but are not limited to; aiming, firing a single round, swinging a sword, dying quickly, diving for cover, running, and dying with a lengthy speech.

=== Other system features ===
As of 2007, the system does not feature rules for space combat. These rules are planned for forthcoming supplements. Vehicle rules were added to the system with the publication of Engines of War in 2007.

== History ==
Battlelords of the Twenty-Third Century has been published in 6 editions since 1990:

- First edition (black-and-white cover illustration of a Ram Python [1990]).
  - First edition, 1st Printing
  - First Edition, 2nd Printing / Arlington Edition
- Revised First edition / Second edition (black-and-white battle scene of a Ram Python and a Phentari [1990])
- Third edition [1991/1992]
  - 1st Printing (Red 'cloud' background with a Phentari on the cover [1991])
  - 2nd Printing ('Blue' battle scene with a sword-wielding Eridani prominent [1992])
- Revised Third edition / Fourth edition ('Blue' battle scene with a sword-wielding Eridani prominent [1992])
- Fifth edition (Black cover with a full-color cityscape illustration [1993])
- Sixth edition / 10th Anniversary Edition (featuring a montage of races and starships on the front cover, published 2000).
- Seventh edition / Kickstarter Edition or Revised Edition (featuring a armored figure flanked by an Eridani and Phentari, with space fighters and a larger Ultra Armor in the background on the front cover [2019]).

23rd Century Productions, LLC now produces the newest version of the game and distributes the prior versions of the game.

== Supplements: Pre-7th Edition ==
Battlelords of the Twenty-Third Century has several supplemental books that further delve into the races and the universe. Some expand on the matrix abilities of the various races or add extra skills, others go into detail behind a race's past and customs. None of these books are required but they expand on the game providing depth, location, and motive for a player to draw upon.

- Galactic Underground I (GU1), by Doug Nelson, Benjamin Pierce, & Lawrence R. Sims. - Rules expansion (introduces the Goola-Goola, Kizanti, and I-Bot races)
- Galactic Underground II (GU2), by Benjamin Pierce & Lawrence R. Sims. - Rules expansion (introduces the Andromeni, Ashanti, Fott, Furbl, Gemini, Ikrini, and Jezzadei races)
- Galactic Underground III (GU3), by Louis Norton, Tony Oliveira, Michael Osadciw, Benjamin Pierce, Christen Roberts, Lawrence R. Sims, Kevin Taufner, Aaron Thies, Scott Tulleners, & Nick Vasi. - Rules expansion (provides background information on careers in the corporate sector, Alliance military, or Alliance intelligence services).
- Uncle Ernie's Minions of Doom (UEMD), by Lawrence R. Sims, Ben Pierce, Doug Nelson, Geoff Wheeler, & Nick Vasi. - Uncle Ernie's "toys" - bioengineered horrors.
- No Man's Land (NML), by Lawrence R. Sims, Doug Nelson, Benjamin Pierce, Louis Norton, & Geoff Wheeler. - Space Atlas (Sector 3, Quadrant 1, Fornax Galaxy).
- Hell's Kitchen (HK), by Lawrence R. Sims. - Planetary Atlas (Hell's Kitchen: Sector 3, Quadrant 1, Fornax Galaxy).
- Lock-N-Loaded: Armor, Equipment, Cybernetics (LnL:AEC), by Lawrence R. Sims. - Gear catalog.
- Lock-N-Loaded: Weapons and Tactics (LnL:WnT), by Lawrence R. Sims. - Weapons catalog.
- Lock-N-Loaded: Reloaded (LnL:R), by Tony Oliveira. - Weapons catalog.
- Beyond the Rift (BtR), by Tony Oliveira. - Space Atlas (The Motaran Rift).
- Condemned, by Benjamin Pierce. - NPCs sourcebook.
- Engines of War (EoW), by Dr. Louis Norton. - Vehicles and power armor catalog. (introduces vehicle combat rules)
- Silent Wars by Harry L. Heckel IV (2012) - The Rebellion sourcebook. An alternate campaign setting in which the characters oppose the Alliance and its influence (introduces the Zzzwhir race).

=== Modules ===
There have also been two modules written for Battlelords of the Twenty-Third century. These modules were written for new players to get the party together and introduce everyone to the life of a mercenary.

- Do Not Be Alarmed: This is Only a Test (1992) - The characters are recruited by a private mercenary corporation. They are sent to attend bootcamp and specialized training at a secure area that uses simulation equipment instead of live weapons and munitions, and robots instead of hostiles, insurgents, and natives. While there, recruits and staff begin to die in bizarre training accidents. Then the planet is invaded by an actual hostile force with real weapons.
- Injection (3rd edition - 1993/ 4th edition - 1994) - The characters are given a mission to extract a deep cover operative. They have very damaging information about the target, a very powerful rival corporation. It goes wrong, gets very complicated, and soon leads to the characters barely escaping. The characters must now chase an elusive enemy across the galaxy while fighting for their lives.

== Reception ==
Allen Mixson reviewed Battlelords of the 23rd Century in White Wolf #35 (March/April, 1993), rating it a 3 out of 5 and stated that "Despite [its flaws], if you are looking for a fairly quick and easy system, check out Battlelords of the 23rd Century. It provides a basis for a beginning game cosmos."

== Reviews ==
- Shadis #23 (Jan. 1996)

== Spinoffs ==
The game inspired a collectible card game named Battlelords released in 1995.

SSDC has announced a series of novels and short stories set in the Battlelord's Universe. The first so far is Across the Wounded Galaxy, released in October 2017.
