= Peter F. Hamilton bibliography =

List of works by or about British science fiction author Peter F. Hamilton.

== Novel series ==
=== Greg Mandel trilogy (1993–1995) ===
1. Mindstar Rising (1993), ISBN 0-330-32376-8
2. A Quantum Murder (1994), ISBN 0-330-33045-4
3. The Nano Flower (1995), ISBN 0-330-33044-6

=== Confederation universe (1996–2000) ===
1. The Reality Dysfunction (1996, published in two volumes in the US: Emergence and Expansion), ISBN 0-330-34032-8
2. The Neutronium Alchemist (1997, published in two volumes in the US: Consolidation and Conflict), ISBN 0-330-35143-5
3. The Naked God (1999, published in two volumes in paperback in the US: Flight and Faith; the US hardback was one volume), ISBN 0-330-35145-1
- The Confederation Handbook (2000, a guide in non-fiction style to the universe of the Night's Dawn trilogy), ISBN 0-330-39614-5

After the Greg Mandel novels, Hamilton wrote a space opera in three volumes, known collectively as The Night's Dawn Trilogy. The three books are each well over a thousand pages long, totalling 1.2 million words altogether. The trilogy is set in a universe with a wealth of worlds and artificial orbiting colonies. The plot is centered on the souls of the dead coming back from a hellish "beyond" to possess the living, and the latter fighting back. It was followed by a companion to the series, The Confederation Handbook, an informational book containing data about the universe of the Night's Dawn trilogy. Hamilton re-set several earlier short stories set in the Confederation timeline, published as the collection A Second Chance at Eden (see "Short story collections" below), including the newly written title novella.

=== Commonwealth universe (2002–2016) ===
==== Misspent Youth ====
Misspent Youth (2002) is shorter than Hamilton's previous works, and again depicts a near-future version of Britain. This was his least well received book critically. Misspent Youth is placed in the same universe as the Commonwealth Saga, though it is not integral to the storyline of those novels. Much of the technology used in those novels (rejuvenation and low-cost/high-capacity memory storage) is established within this book.

==== Commonwealth Saga ====
1. Pandora's Star (2004), ISBN 978-0345461629
2. Judas Unchained (2005), ISBN 978-0345461667

The Commonwealth Saga is published in two halves, Pandora's Star and Judas Unchained. Set approximately 300 years later in the same universe as Misspent Youth, it explores the social effects of the almost complete elimination of the experience of death following widespread use of the rejuvenation technique described in Misspent Youth. In somewhat similar style to Night's Dawn, Hamilton also outlines, in detail, a universe with a small number of distinct alien species interacting essentially peacefully and who suddenly become faced with an increasingly ominous external threat. The saga focuses on wormhole technology and the first expansion in the space nearer to earth. Fifteen key new worlds are established.

==== Void Trilogy ====
1. The Dreaming Void (2007), ISBN 978-1-4050-8880-0
2. The Temporal Void (2008), ISBN 978-1-4050-8883-1
3. The Evolutionary Void (2010), ISBN 978-0-345-49657-7

Set in the same universe as the Commonwealth Saga, the Void Trilogy is set 1200 years after the end of Judas Unchained. A timeline that links the Commonwealth Saga with the Void Trilogy, filling in the 1200-year gap, has been written by Hamilton.

==== The Chronicle of the Fallers ====
1. The Abyss Beyond Dreams (2014), ISBN 978-0-345-54719-4
2. A Night Without Stars (2016), ISBN 978-0230769496 (UK), ISBN 978-0-345-54722-4 (US)

Hamilton announced in 2011 that he was developing a new trilogy. He later cut this down to two books titled The Chronicle of the Fallers. It is a return to his Commonwealth Universe, set in the same time-frame as the Void Trilogy, and tells the story of Nigel Sheldon and what happened when he broke into the Void.

=== The Queen of Dreams (2014–2017) ===
1. The Secret Throne (2014), ISBN 0-857-53381-9
2. The Hunting of the Princes (2016)
3. A Voyage Through Air (10 August 2017)

A children's fantasy series also known as Book of the Realms.

=== Salvation Sequence (2018–2020) ===
- Salvation (2018), ISBN 978-0399178764
- Salvation Lost (2019), ISBN 978-0399178856
- The Saints of Salvation (2020), ISBN 978-0399178887

Hamilton's Salvation sequence involves two concurrent story lines. One is set during the year 2204. In this period humanity has developed near-instantaneous space travel via a network of QSE (quantum-spatial entanglement) portals and are using them to begin spreading out into the galaxy. As a consequence of this technology, crewed spaceships are unnecessary. When an unknown vessel is found on a recently explored world, a team of specialists are sent out to investigate both the craft and the astonishing contents therein. The other story line is set much farther in the future. It follows a genetically engineered team of special forces designed to confront and destroy an enemy who are following their religious agenda of harvesting all sentient species in the galaxy.

=== Arkship Trilogy (2021–2022) ===
- A Hole in the Sky (2021), ISBN 978-1705245286
- The Captain’s Daughter (2022), ISBN 978-1705245309
- Queens of an Alien Sun (2022), ISBN 978-1705245323

Released as an audiobook exclusive, Arkship Trilogy is a departure from the typical widescreen space opera Hamilton is known for, instead focusing on a colony ship story from a first-person perspective. After that he is contracted to write a new two-book space opera series in a different universe.

=== Exodus series (Duology) (2024–2026) ===
- Exodus: The Archimedes Engine (2024), ISBN 978-0593357668
- Exodus: The Helium Sea (2026), ISBN 978-0593357699

== Standalone novels ==
- Fallen Dragon (2001), ISBN 9781447281313

Hamilton's full-length novel Fallen Dragon is in many ways a condensation of the ideas and styles (and even characters) of the Night's Dawn trilogy, if rather darker in tone. The stand-alone book describes a bleak corporatocratic society dominated by five mega-corporations which wield almost unlimited power. It describes the troubled military campaign by one of these companies to "realise assets" from a minor colony, through the eyes of a veteran mercenary. One of the more interesting aspects of the book was its unconventional description of a spacefaring society which has developed interstellar travel but only at vast expense, putting it out of the reach of many people and a one-way trip for most of the rest.

- Great North Road (2012), ISBN 978-0-345-52666-3

Set in Newcastle upon Tyne in 2143, Great North Road is a futuristic murder mystery.

- Light Chaser, with Gareth L. Powell (2021), ISBN 9781250769824

== Short story collections ==
- A Second Chance at Eden (1998, collection of short stories set in the Confederation universe), ISBN 0-330-35182-6
  - "Sonnie's Edge" (originally published in New Moon, Issue 1, September 1991). Animated as a short in the adult cartoon series Love, Death & Robots (Netflix streaming 2021)
  - "A Second Chance at Eden"
  - "New Days Old Times"
  - "Candy Buds"
  - "Deathday"
  - "The Lives and Loves of Tiarella Rosa"
  - "Escape Route"
- Manhattan in Reverse (2011)
  - Watching Trees Grow (2000, novella originally published as a limited signed edition by PS Publishing; later anthologised in Futures; then published in a mass market paperback edition), ISBN 0-575-07305-5.)
  - "Footvote" (2005)
  - "If at First..." (2011, short story broadcast on BBC Radio 4 Extra)
  - "The Forever Kitten" (2005)
  - "Blessed by an Angel" (2007) in the Void Trilogy universe
  - The Demon Trap (2011) in the Commonwealth Saga universe
  - Manhattan in Reverse (2011) in the Commonwealth Saga universe

== Other short fiction ==
- "De-De and the Beanstalk" (1992, published in New Moon, Issue 2, January 1992)
- "Falling Stones" (1992)
- "Spare Capacity" (1993)
- "Adam's Gene" (1993)
- "Starlight Dreamer" (1994)
- "Eat Re-ecebread" with Graham Joyce (1994, published in Interzone)
- "The White Stuff" with Graham Joyce (1997)
- "Lightstorm" (1998, Web 2027 # 5)
- "The Suspect Genome" (1993, novella featuring Mandel published in Interzone, republished as "Family Matters" in 2014)
- "Softlight Sins" (unknown)
- "Return of the Mutant Worms" (2011, published in Solaris Rising)
- A Window Into Time (2016, ISBN 978-0-42-528649-4)
- "Sonnie's Union" (2020, published in the collection "Made To Order" edited by Jonathan Strahan ISBN 978-1-78108-787-9)
