= Jim Burns =

Welsh artist (born 1948)

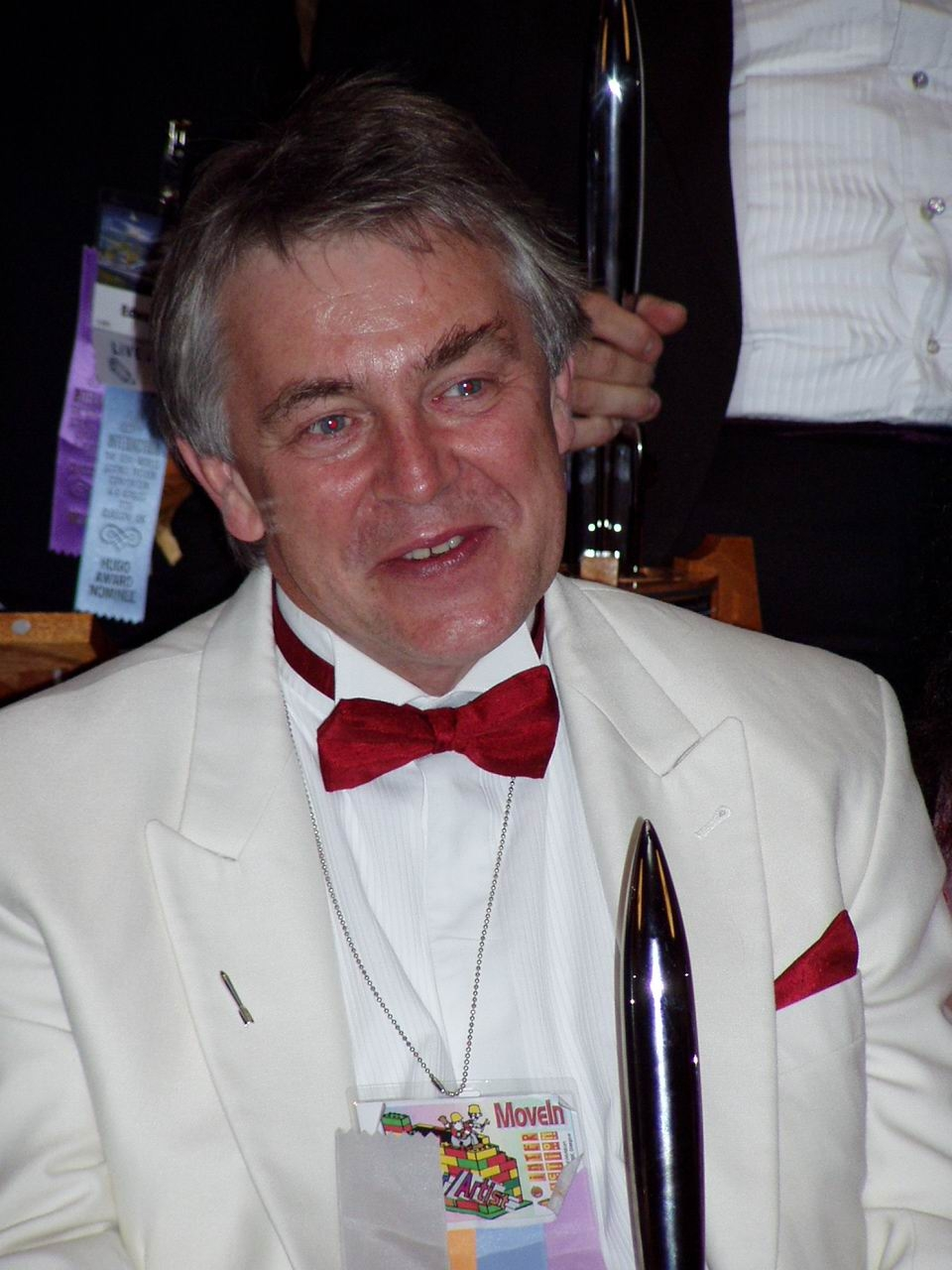
Jim Burns with a Hugo Award at Worldcon 2005 in Glasgow

Jim Burns (born 10 April 1948) is a Welsh artist born in Cardiff, Wales. He has been called one of the Grand Masters of the science fiction art world.

== Life and career ==
In 1966, Burns joined the Royal Air Force, but soon left and signed up at the Newport School of Art for a year's foundation course. After the course, he went on to complete a 3-year Diploma in Art and Design at Saint Martin's School of Art in London. When he left Saint Martin's in 1972 he had already joined the recently established illustration agency Young Artists. He has been with this agency, later renamed Arena, ever since.

He is today a contemporary British science fiction illustrator. His work mostly deals with science fiction with erotic overtones. His paintings are generally intricate photo-realistic works of beautiful women set against advanced machines and spaceships. While his preparatory sketches are more erotically focused, his final works and published book covers have a more academic tone portraying far off and imaginary worlds.

Apart from book and game covers, Burns briefly worked with Ridley Scott on Blade Runner, and his illustrations and paintings comprise much of the book Mechanismo by Harry Harrison. He has also had books of his own works published, including Lightship, Planet Story (written by Harry Harrison), Transluminal, and Imago.

Burns won the Hugo award for best professional artist three times and has also been awarded 12 BSFA awards. Well regarded in fandom, he was artist guest of honour at the 1987 Worldcon.

== Portfolio ==
Work by the artist includes cover art for:

- Eye (short story collection) (1985) by Frank Herbert
- The Fury of Dracula (1987) a boardgame by Stephen Hand
- Two books by Daniel Keys Moran
  - Armageddon Blues (1988)
  - The Long Run (1989)
- Artificial Things (1989) for Karen Joy Fowler
- Over thirty books by Robert Silverberg including The Face of the Waters (1991)
- Aristoi (1992) by Walter Jon Williams
- Upland Outlaws (1993) by Dave Duncan
- Infinity's Shore (1996) by David Brin
- The Stone Dance of the Chameleon series by Ricardo Pinto
  - The Chosen (1999)
  - The Standing Dead (2002)
  - The Third God (2009)
- The Greg Mandel Trilogy by Peter F. Hamilton
  - Mindstar Rising (1993)
  - A Quantum Murder (1994)
  - The Nano Flower (1995)
- The Night's Dawn Trilogy by Peter F. Hamilton
  - The Reality Dysfunction (1996)
  - The Neutronium Alchemist (1997)
  - The Naked God (1999)
- A Second Chance at Eden (1998) by Peter F. Hamilton
- The Confederation Handbook (2000) by Peter F. Hamilton
- Fallen Dragon (2001) by Peter F. Hamilton
- The Commonwealth Saga by Peter F. Hamilton
  - Pandora's Star (2004)
  - Judas Unchained (2005)
- The Void trilogy by Peter F. Hamilton
  - The Dreaming Void (2007)
  - The Temporal Void (2008)

In 2014, Titan Books published a collection of Burns's art throughout his career, The Art of Jim Burns: Hyperluminal.
