= New Washington =

New Washington is the name of several places:

United States:

- New Washington, Indiana
- New Washington, Ohio
- New Washington, Pennsylvania
- A former name of Morgan's Point, Texas during the early 19th century

Philippines:

- New Washington, Aklan

In fiction:

- See Planets and habitats of the Night's Dawn trilogy as to a planet in Peter F. Hamilton's The Night's Dawn Trilogy
