= Misspent Youth =

2002 novel by Peter F. Hamilton

- First edition
- Author: Peter F. Hamilton
- Language: English
- Publisher: Pan Books
- Publication date: 2002
- Media type: Print (Hardcover and paperback)
- Pages: 439
- ISBN: 0330480227
- OCLC: 968996431

Misspent Youth is a 2002 science fiction novel by English author Peter F. Hamilton, named after the rock band of the same name from the 1970s.

== Setting ==
Set around 2040, it describes the story of Jeff Baker, an inventor who revolutionises the world by creating the ultimate method of information storage and, instead of selling it, offers it open source. Because of this act, he is chosen as the candidate for the first use of rejuvenation technology which leaves him with the body of a young man. Hamilton forms a picture of a famous man with a troubled family, living in a troubled Rutland, England – also Hamilton's home county. This is very much a character driven story and focuses on the effects that Jeff's rejuvenation has on his family.

The novel has received mixed reviews, with Hamilton himself best describing why: "I could see why it didn't appeal to a lot of people. It was an unpleasant story about unpleasant people. With hindsight, it was never going to be as popular as my other works."

The story envisions that after the invention of the "datasphere", traditional publishing industries finally lost control on their copyright, and the development of new novels, music and movies collapsed. The United Kingdom remains a part of a more closely integrated European Union, with violent separatist movements in many member states.

== Plot ==
Seventy-eight-year-old Jeff Baker has revolutionised the world by inventing a method of information storage and allowing free use of it with no profits going into his own pocket. Because of this act, he is chosen by the European Union to be the first recipient for "rejuvenation technology", which will leave him with the body of a young man. As part of the deal, he will support the re-election of the EU president.

His son Tim has a fairly typical frustrated life as a rich teenager, living with his famous father and distant mother. Tim is extremely happy when he starts going out with gorgeous Annabelle. She likes him, but she has a troubled home life and Tim's drinking problem reminds her of her father.

Jeff comes home from the rejuvenation in his 20-year-old body. Energised by his new youthfulness, he has a series of affairs. After reconnecting with his son, Jeff reveals to Tim that the reason he gave away the information storage technology was so that his ex-wife could not get any royalties. The amazing act of charity he is famous for was motivated by spite, not goodwill. But Jeff finds himself attracted to Annabelle, and while giving her a ride home after Tim got too drunk at a school dance, they start a tawdry affair behind Tim's back and fall in love. Their passionate relationship is only a secret for a short time before Tim finds them in bed together. His life falling apart, Tim runs away to live with his Aunt (Jeff's sister), stops drinking and doing drugs, and makes friends with his mother. Eventually he finds a new romantic interest in Vanessa, one of his classmates.

Jeff and Annabelle are happy together, travelling around the world, meeting celebrities, even experimenting with a ménage à trois. However, they are sad that they have hurt Tim, who gets seriously injured in a jet-ski accident, providing a catalyst for Jeff to re-enter Tim's life.

Jeff and Annabelle both attend a controversial EU conference in London so Jeff can speak supporting the EU. Tim and his friends join a massive and violent protest in the streets below the conference. As the riots begin, concerned for Tim's safety, Jeff changes his mind about supporting the EU and leaves the conference to charge through the riots to find his son. Impressed by this act, Tim finds it in him to forgive his father and Annabelle.

In the end, Jeff is dying because the rejuvenation treatment is not yet a properly functional technology, and it is failing him. After arranging for Annabelle's pregnancy with his second genetically improved child, a girl this time, he begins a live broadcast, where he reveals the lies of the EU government and rescinds his support for the presidential campaign, his family and loved ones join the broadcast. It is implied that Jeff dies during the broadcast.

== References to other works ==
Misspent Youth is set in the same universe as Hamilton's later Commonwealth Saga, consisting of Pandora's Star (2004) and Judas Unchained (2005). Jeff Baker is mentioned in the prologue to Pandora's Star and Annabelle Goddard is also mentioned in Judas Unchained. In addition, the rejuvenation and datasphere technologies established in Misspent Youth are shown in a vastly more sophisticated form in this series. Pandora's Star is set in 2380, approximately 340 years after the events of Misspent Youth.

Jeff's son Tim is shown to be the President of the Commonwealth in approximately 3595 in A Night Without Stars, book 2 of The Chronicle of the Fallers.

== Publication ==
The novel was first published in the US in August 2006 in a new edition which had been re-edited for the US market.

== Reception ==
Publishers Weekly was not very positive in their review saying that "scenes of passion and parent-child conflict are not particularly interesting, and the unconvincing sentimental ending likewise disappoints."

Kirkus Reviews described the novel as "Flowers for Algernon, centering on sex instead of brains."
