= Chozen (disambiguation) =

Chozen is a 2014 television series.

Chozen may also refer to:

- Harry Chozen (1915 – 1994), a baseball player
- Jan Chozen Bays (b. 1945), a pediatrician and Zen teacher
- Young Chozen, a hip hop artist
- Chozen Toguchi, a fictional character in the film The Karate Kid Part II (1986) and its spinoff streaming TV series Cobra Kai (2021 – present), portrayed by Yuji Okumoto
- An extraterrestrial people in the novel The Web of the Chozen by Jack Chalker (1978)

== See also ==
- Chosen (disambiguation)
