= The Reality Dysfunction =

1996 SF novel by Peter F. Hamilton

- First edition
- Author: Peter F. Hamilton
- Cover artist: Jim Burns
- Language: English
- Series: The Night's Dawn Trilogy
- Genre: Science fiction
- Publisher: Macmillan Publishers
- Publication date: 26 January 1996
- Publication place: United Kingdom
- Media type: Print (hardback & paperback), E-Book
- Pages: 955
- ISBN: 0-333-63427-6
- OCLC: 59651803
- Followed by: The Neutronium Alchemist

The Reality Dysfunction is a science fiction novel by British writer Peter F. Hamilton, the first book in The Night's Dawn Trilogy. It is followed by The Neutronium Alchemist and The Naked God. It was first published in the United Kingdom by Macmillan Publishers on 26 January 1996. The first US edition, which was broken into two volumes, Emergence and Expansion (the UK paperback is not), followed in July and August 1997 from Time Warner Books. The second US edition, published by Orbit Books in October 2008, is published in a single volume.

In some countries, the paperback editions were split into two (Germany and the United States), three (France) or four volumes (Italy and Portugal) per book. Usually the first volume is a translation of "Emergence".

== Background ==
The novel is set in the 26th and 27th centuries. The opening chapters cover a period of some thirty years, with the bulk of the story set in the years 2610 and 2611 AD.

A timeline in the appendix briskly covers the future history of the human race, from the settling of the Moon and the opening up of space to commercial exploitation to the founding of the Confederation. Humanity is split into two strands, the Adamists and the Edenists.

The Edenists possess the affinity gene, which allows telepathic communication between one another and the construction and use of bio-technological (or 'bitek') constructs, including sentient, living starships (voidhawks) and enormous space habitats. The Edenists inhabit sentient habitats orbiting gas giants, which they mine for helium-3, and they have a much greater standard of living than their Adamist counterparts.

The Adamists, divided into numerous nation-states, are 'classic' humans who employ mechanical and cybernetic technology and use implants to achieve their ends. The Adamists mostly reject bitek for religious and cultural reasons, but it is later revealed that certain individuals working within Earth's government have discouraged the use of bitek for fear of losing their ability to influence the development of mankind. Some Adamists still use bitek, such as 'blackhawks', advanced living spacecraft similar to Edenist voidhawks, with enhanced combat capabilities.

Despite their cultural, ideological and religious differences, the Edenists and Adamists generally work together in a forum known as the Confederation, which seeks to regulate interstellar trade, prevent war and repress the use and spread of antimatter, the most feared weapon of mass destruction at the time of the novels.

Humanity has only encountered three extraterrestrial races: the Jiciro, a race in the stages of an Industrial Revolution that the Confederation is observing discreetly; the Tyrathca, an insectoid species fleeing the destruction of their home world through a nova; and the Kiint, an incredibly advanced, ancient species who adopt a slightly condescending policy of non-interference in human affairs, but occasionally help with scientific research in areas of mutual interest. The Kiint only occupy one planet and do not possess starships, claiming to have passed beyond the need for economics and now exist purely to learn more about the universe. The Confederation has also found the ruins of a race known as the Laymil who, for reasons unknown, committed racial suicide some two thousand years prior to the start of the novels.

== Plot summary ==
The Reality Dysfunction opens in the year 2581 with a war raging between two worlds, Omuta and Garissa, over three hundred and eighty seven mineral-rich asteroids known as the Dorados. The war escalates in a matter of months and it is rumoured that Garissa has developed an ultimate weapon of mass destruction known only as 'The Alchemist'. The Alchemist deployment mission, on the starship Beezling and its two escorts, is intercepted by blackhawk mercenaries. Two of the ships survive, although they are crippled and stranded far from the nearest system. Dr. Alkad Mzu, creator of the Alchemist, survives the attack. Shortly after, the Omutans drop fifteen antimatter planet-busters on Garissa, rendering the planet uninhabitable and killing the majority of the ninety-five million inhabitants. The Confederation imposes a 30-year blockade around Omuta, and executes its government.

Many millions of years earlier, the extremely rare conditions on a moon orbiting a gas giant in a remote galaxy allow for the creation of a lifeform able to 'transcend' to a purely energy-based (later known as energistic) state, the Ly-Cilph. The Ly-cilph become explorers of the universe, determined to know all that can be known about space and time. Over the course of aeons, they explore the universe and, presently, one arrives in the Milky Way galaxy.

An Edenist voidhawk named Iasius returns home to Saturn to die. As is traditional, a mating flight is called, with many voidhawks and even a blackhawk, Udat, joining Iasius on its final voyage into Saturn's atmosphere. As it descends, the other ships energise its bitek eggs, which are taken to nest in Saturn's rings. After several months, when the eggs are large enough, the infant children of Iasius' captain, Athene, are placed within them, so ship and captain experience infancy together, forming an unbreakable bond of love. The ship that grows from the egg energised by Udat, Oenone, becomes the most notable of the new brood of voidhawks, and its captain, Syrinx, the most wilful. As with many Edenists, Syrinx and Oenone volunteer to serve a tour of duty with the Confederation Navy, but the destruction of their fellow ship Graeae (commanded by Syrinx's brother, Thetis) by an Adamist starship (called the Dymasio) using antimatter causes Syrinx to take a dim view of Adamists in general from that point on. She finishes her service with the Navy and then goes into cargo shipping.

A group of colonists arrive on the frontier world of Lalonde from Earth. Grossly overpopulated, with tens, sometimes hundreds of millions of people crammed into domed cities called arcologies, many people on Earth dream of escaping to virgin worlds with open skies above their heads. However, Lalonde is a typical stage-one colony world, dirty and corrupt with a ridiculously low level of technology. The latest colonists, mostly from Earth's European arcologies, vow to create a peaceful, safe society. They are taken by steamboat up the mighty Juliffe River to found their new township, which they name Aberdale. Among the colonists are the Skibbow family, whose patriarch, Gerald, is excited about the prospect of living as a farmer. His teenage daughter, Marie, is less impressed and vows to escape back to Earth at the first opportunity. Also among the colonists are Father Horst Elwes, a Christian priest, and a large number of 'Ivets' (Involuntary Transportees), petty criminals from Earth sentenced to work on the colony worlds to repay their debt to society. Unbeknown to the authorities, one of the Ivets, Quinn Dexter, is a member of the Light Brother sect (Satan worshippers) and is armed with highly advanced information implants which have escaped detection. Dexter soon exerts his command over all the other Ivets through the use of satanic rituals, whilst simultaneously ingratiating himself with the colonists. His act does not fool Powel Manani, the town's assigned settlement supervisor. Around this time the Ly-cilph arrives on Lalonde and studies Aberdale. Its curiosity is piqued when Father Elwes manages to see it, since few species are capable of perceiving it.

Joshua Calvert is a resident of Tranquillity, an independent bitek habitat (one of only five such habitats) orbiting the gas giant Mirchusko. Tranquillity was founded to study the Ruin Ring, the remains of some forty thousand alien habitats which apparently self-destructed two thousand years ago. The crown prince of the interplanetary Christian kingdom of Kulu believes that research on this destruction must be launched, notably to preserve humanity. He is implanted with the affinity gene, passed on to his descendants and creates a habitat, Tranquility, which he leads. Upon his death, his son succeeded him and continued the search. Tranquillity was excommunicated by the Kingdom and its leaders disinherited. Since then it has flourished as a tax haven, a trustworthy base for blackhawk mating flights, and an exclusive business locale in its area of the Confederation. Calvert has inherited a trader starship, the Lady MacBeth, from his late father, but the ship was heavily damaged in an unknown incident (Calvert makes up several stories during the course of the novel to explain this incident, all false; the incident is later explained in the short story 'Escape Route' in the short story collection A Second Chance at Eden) and is no longer operational. Calvert dreams of making a big find in the Ruin Ring to finance repairs. Much to his surprise, Calvert indeed strikes lucky, finding a virtually intact memory core with the first-ever images of the reason for the Laymil racial suicide. However, decoding the information will take some time. Calvert sells his find for nearly seven million six hundred thousand fuseodollars, fixes up the Lady MacBeth and begins his life as a trader captain. He also starts a relationship with Ione Saldana, the heir of Michael and current ruler of Tranquillity.

Also on Tranquillity is Dr. Alkad Mzu, who arrived there a little less than thirty years ago and was hired in the Laymils research program. How she escaped the situation at the start of the novel is not explained. Mzu is kept under the watchful eye of half a dozen major Confederation intelligence agencies to ensure that her knowledge of the Alchemist is not revealed to anyone else. From time to time, Mzu asks ship captains for passage off the habitat, knowing that such requests will be vetoed by Ione Saldana. She asks both Calvert and Meyer, the captain of the Udat, for aid but both times they refuse to help after Saldana intervenes.

On Lalonde Dexter encounters a group of people hiding in the jungle, led by the authoritative Laton. Laton is a 'Serpent', an Edenist who has rejected his society and, for lack of a better term, 'gone bad'. More than thirty-five years ago Laton tried to stage a coup to seize control of a habitat called Jantrit, using a proteinic virus to threaten it with destruction. In the resulting chaos the habitat was destroyed (the only Edenist habitat ever lost) with more than a million deaths. The Confederation Navy believed it had killed Laton, but Laton had evaded capture and fled into obscurity in the wilds of Lalonde. Laton, impressed with Dexter's resourcefulness (but disgusted by his religion), offers him a place in his organisation, whose goal is the discovery of true immortality. Dexter pretends to agree, knowing refusal will mean death. Realising that Dexter is faking his interest, Laton arranges for the villagers to discover that the Ivets are satanists. In the resulting chaos most of Dexter's followers are killed. The remaining few take Powel Manani prisoner and sacrifice him in a grisly ceremony. At this moment, the observing Ly-cilph detects a strange energy current streaming from Manani through a quantum fracture in the space-time continuum. The Ly-cilph attempts to investigate by following the energy current, only to find it flooding into an energistic vacuum. Unable to extricate itself, the Ly-cilph goes into hibernation whilst still halfway between the two dimensions. This allows the strange energy forms in the dimension beyond to cross back into our universe.

The result is utter mayhem. Several of the strange entities seize control of Dexter and his followers, in effect 'possessing' them. Able to call upon powers from the other realm, such as the ability to control and alter matter and hurl powerful white fireballs around, they then seize control of Aberdale and Laton's compound, forcing the inhabitants to accept possession or death. Father Elwes escapes onto the savannah with most of Aberdale's children, but not before one of the possessed reveals a terrible secret: the possessing entities are the souls of humans who have died and been trapped, some of them for millennia, in an absolute void where the only way to pass the time is to parasitically feed on the memories and experiences of others. And there are billions of them in the darkness still screaming for escape.

At the moment Laton is possessed, he manages to generate a tremendously powerful affinity SOS. This reaches the only two Edenists on the planet, a pair of agents from the Edenist Intelligence agency. They travel upriver to investigate, but are neutralised by the possessed. They manage to alert Ralph Hiltch (the Kulu External Security Agency's Lalonde head of station) and Kelven Solanki (from Confederation Navy Intelligence) to the threat, although not its nature. With the subversion spreading across the planet, the governor authorises the recruitment of mercenaries to put down what he perceives as an 'Ivet uprising'. Unbeknown to the governor, several possessed have already infiltrated the capital, Durringham, and taken passage on ships bound for other worlds.

One of these ships is the Lady MacBeth. Calvert has hit on the idea of transporting the most resistant wood known to the pastoral planet of Norfolk, which has banned all high technology: this wood is the one of Lalonde (called mayope) . The idea sounds crazy, but it gets around Norfolk's ban on high-tech items and gives Calvert access to the planet's lucrative market in 'Norfolk Tears', the most desired alcoholic beverage in the galaxy. Calvert also begins a relationship with Louise Kavanagh, the young and naive daughter of Joshua's business partner, Grant. Although Calvert treats the relationship as a bit of fun, Louise falls in love with Joshua and, due to her planet's lack of chemical contraceptive, discovers she is pregnant shortly after he leaves. Unfortunately for Norfolk, Calvert's passenger on the flight from Lalonde was a man called Quinn Dexter.

Syrinx and Oenone arrive at Atlantis, the only planet colonised by Edenists (and unsurprisingly, entirely covered in a vast planet-ranging ocean), to purchase seafood to transport to Norfolk to trade for their Tears. During the stay at Pernik Island, Syrinx develops a relationship with an Edenist by the name of Mosul, the son of the family patriarch and guardian of the family fishing business. Mosul and Syrinx develop a contract which includes Syrinx's return to distribute ten percent of Syrinx's stock to the inhabitants of Pernik Island. However, the possessed have infiltrated Atlantis, led by the possessed Laton. They have taken control of Pernik Island and plan to possess Syrinx in the hope of possessing Oenone as well. Syrinx is captured and tortured as a prelude to possession. The plot backfires when Laton, having taken the time to study his possessing soul, manages to gain access to Pernik Island. He saves Syrinx, allows the crew of Oenone to rescue her (and gives them a message to take to Jupiter), and then causes the island to self-destruct, killing all of the possessed on it.

Laton's departure from Lalonde was observed by a reporter. Within days half the Confederation knows that the most infamous Serpent of them all has returned, and a Confederation-wide quarantine to prevent the spread of Laton and his proteanic virus is enacted.

On Tranquillity data from the Laymil information stack reveals that their homeworld in the Mirchusko system (which does not seem to exist any more) was taken over by a 'reality dysfunction', triggered by the 'Galheith research death essence tragedy'. The data shows the Laymil homeworld being overrun by a red cloud of unknown origin.

On Lalonde the possessed close to within a few hundred kilometres of Durringham. As they advance, a strange red cloud starts forming above centres of possessed activity. Ralph Hiltch and Kelven Solanki evacuate their respective personnel from the planet. Hiltch's team manage to capture a possessed before they leave (this possessed is controlling the body of Gerald Skibbow of Aberdale) Solanki's report reaches the Confederation Navy, which swiftly organises a fleet to quarantine Lalonde.

On Norfolk Quinn Dexter manages to reassert control of his body, by feeding his possessor images of his depraved activities as a satanist to the point where the possessor starts behaving like Dexter and then retreats into a catatonic state. Enhanced with his ex-possessor's energistic power, Dexter swiftly organises the possessed and they rapidly start taking over the planet.

Several more possessed reach the independent bitek habitat Valisk in the Srinagar system and begin possessing several inhabitants as a prelude to taking over the entire habitat. They are led by Kiera, who has possessed the body of Marie Skibbow from Aberdale. Dariat, one of the descendants of Rubra, the eccentric genius who founded Valisk and then transferred his personality into it upon his death, becomes aware of their activities and volunteers to help them, so he can revenge himself upon the manipulative Rubra. His knowledge of the habitat's surveillance techniques and how to evade them proves invaluable to the possessed. They kill him, and then guide his soul into a new body to give him the same powers they possess.

The Kulu embassy staff reach Ombey, the nearest Kulu colony world to Lalonde. However, when they bring their possessed prisoner out of zero-tau (a form of suspension which reduces energy movements to zero, effectively freezing time), they find the possessing spirit has fled, leaving the traumatised, broken form of Gerald Skibbow within. Princess Kirsten Saldana, the Saldana family member responsible for Ombey, is rapidly forced to declare a state of emergency when it is revealed that three personnel from the embassy staff were possessed and have begun spreading across the planet. Ralph Hiltch is brought in to advise.

The Lady MacBeth reaches Tranquillity at the same time that representatives of the Lalonde government are forming a mercenary fleet and army to save the planet. Keen to protect his investment, Calvert volunteers to accompany the fleet. They reach Lalonde (of which a sizable portion is covered by a strange red cloud) and begin landing mercenaries on the surface, but many of the landing teams are rapidly possessed and return to the orbiting ships. A full-scale space battle erupts when the Confederation Navy squadron arrives to blockade the planet and the possessed ships start firing on them. The mercenary team from the Lady MacBeth evades possession and manage to take a prisoner whose possessor is called Shaun Wallace, who tells them that the red cloud will hide Lalonde from the universe. He reveals that the possessed can hear the cries for help from the entities still in 'the beyond' and they desperately need to escape them. Once the cloud encircles Lalonde completely, the combined will of the possessed can physically move the planet onto another plane of existence where the cries of the dead souls will not reach them.

The mercenary team evacuates to a nearby settlement belonging to the alien Tyrathca. The xenocs are extremely agitated by the human's newly revealed ability to become 'elemental' as they call it. They have built a statue to their 'Sleeping God', which 'sees the universe' and they believe will save them. A reporter accompanying the mission, Kelly Tirrel, takes images of the statue and notes that there is no record of the Tyrathca having a god due to their highly unimaginative nature. They move on and discover Father Elwes and the children from Aberdale in hiding on the savannah. They manage to arrange a pick-up from the Lady MacBeth. The mercenary team sacrifices itself against an attack by possessed masquerading as the stereotypical knights in shining armour in order to give the children, Elwes and Kelly, time to evacuate.

A message hidden in the request for aid given by Alkad Mzu to Captain Meyer of the Udat is revealed, offering him a vast sum of money for his help in aiding her escape. Meyer agrees and has Udat make a wormhole jump into the interior of Tranquillity. Mzu arranges to be in place for a pick-up, but underestimates the ability and sheer power of Tranquillity to enforce its will through affinity. Udat is compelled to jump back out with Mzu perilously hanging onto a rope ladder trailing from the blackhawk.

The story continues in The Neutronium Alchemist.

== Reception ==
Cliff Ramshaw reviewed The Reality Dysfunction for Arcane magazine, rating it an 8 out of 10 overall. Ramshaw comments that "Hamilton's wide scope and weak characters mean that the initial stages of the novel flounder. It isn't until after page 200 or so that the plot begins to take shape; after page 300 things are motoring along at a more than acceptable rate. Towards the end the epic scale really pays off: the tension mounts and mounts as a wide array of human forces, hampered by ignorance and communication failures, attempts to halt an invasion on a colony world seemingly without strategic value."

== Reviews ==
- Review by Christopher Geary (1996) in The Zone #4, Summer 1996
- Review by Russell Letson (1996) in Locus, #422 March 1996
- Review by James Lovegrove (1996) in Interzone, #106 April 1996
- Review by Gary S. Dalkin (1996) in Vector 188
- Review by Neal Baker (1997) in Foundation, #71 Autumn 1997
- Review [French] by Marie-Laure Vauge (1999) in Galaxies, #15
- Review [French] by Marie-Laure Vauge (2000) in Galaxies, #16
- Review by Stephen E. Andrews and Nick Rennison (2006) in 100 Must-Read Science Fiction Novels
- Review by Paul Witcover (2009) in Locus, #582 July 2009
