= The Naked God =

1999 SF novel by Peter F. Hamilton

- First edition
- Author: Peter F. Hamilton
- Cover artist: Jim Burns
- Language: English
- Series: The Night's Dawn Trilogy
- Genre: Science fiction
- Publisher: Macmillan Publishers
- Publication date: 8 October 1999
- Publication place: United Kingdom
- Media type: Print (hardback & paperback)
- Pages: 1,174
- ISBN: 0-333-68791-4
- OCLC: 43070064
- Preceded by: The Neutronium Alchemist

The Naked God is a science fiction novel by British writer Peter F. Hamilton, the third book in The Night's Dawn Trilogy, following on from The Reality Dysfunction and The Neutronium Alchemist. It was published in the United Kingdom by Macmillan Publishers on 8 October 1999. This was the first novel by Hamilton to be published in hardcover in the United States, on 22 October 1999. As with the first two volumes, the US paperback was split into two volumes, entitled Flight and Faith, published in November and December 2000. In February 2009 Orbit Books issued the first one-volume paperback edition of the novel in the US.

Even by the standards of the first two books, The Naked God is an extremely large volume. It was only possible to publish the UK paperback in one volume by moderately decreasing the font size compared to the previous novels.

Although the final novel so far in the Night's Dawn Universe (a 'guidebook' to the setting, The Confederation Handbook, was later published), Hamilton has occasionally hinted at returning to the setting in future books in the form of a sequel series set up to 500 years after the events in the trilogy.

== Background ==
In The Reality Dysfunction, the presence of an energy-based alien lifeform during the death of a human on the colony world of Lalonde somehow 'jammed open' the interface between this universe and 'the beyond', an energistic vacuum where the souls of dead humans (and other races, although they inhabit different areas within that realm) have become trapped after death. They are able to cross back over into this universe and possess the living, gaining tremendous strength, agility and the ability to create and alter matter. They overrun the planet Lalonde in a matter of weeks and spread beyond to many other worlds and asteroid settlements. A failed attempt to conquer the planet Atlantis alerts the Edenists to the threat.

In The Neutronium Alchemist, the Confederation learns of the extent of the danger and imposes a complete shut-down of all interstellar flight to quarantine the possessed on the few planets they have secured a foothold on. However, quarantine-busting flights soon spread the possessed further. The deployment of military forces against the possessed is complicated by the fact that killing the possessor also kills the possessed victim. This depressing fact, creating the greatest hostage situation in human history, threatens to undermine morale. Eventually, the Kulu Kingdom joins forces with their ideological opponents, the Edenists, to retake the peninsula of Mortonridge on their colony world of Ombey from the possessed to provide the Confederation with proof that the possessed can be beaten. Elsewhere, the most infamous 'returnee' of the possessed, Al Capone, uses his organisational skills to conquer the planet New California and turn it into the hub of an expanding empire, 'The Organisation', with the Confederation Navy hard-pressed to deal with checking its advance whilst maintaining the quarantine.

At the conclusion of The Neutronium Alchemist, the personnel of Tranquillity learned that over a thousand years ago a Tyrathca arkship encountered a space-borne entity known as the 'Sleeping God' which exhibited enormous powers which may be of use against the possessed. Before this information could be passed onto anyone, the habitat came under concerted attack by the Organisation. When Captain Calvert and the crew of the Lady MacBeth arrived back at Tranquillity, they found the habitat missing, presumed possessed and taken out of the universe.

== Plot summary ==
Jay Hilton, one of the surviving children from Lalonde, is awoken when Tranquillity falls under attack by the Organisation and its hellhawk allies. With the habitat in imminent danger of destruction, the Kiint personnel immediately evacuate by triggering their 'Emergency Exodus Facility', personal wormholes that transport them to the real Kiint home star system. An infant Kiint, Haile, decides that she cannot let Jay be killed in the attack and activates the Emergency Exodus Facility on her, removing her from Tranquillity as well, to the displeasure of her parents, Nang and Lieria. Jay finds herself on a planet which appears to be just one in a necklace of hundreds orbiting a star in the same orbit. Haile's parents reluctantly confirm that this, the Kiint home system, is actually in another galaxy, and the supposed Kiint homeworld of Jobis was actually just a single scientific outpost. They regretfully announce that Tranquillity has either been destroyed or forced to surrender to the possessed.

The Jovian Consensus is placed on an emergency alert when a colossal wormhole opens above Jupiter. They are shocked when the habitat Tranquillity appears. Ione Saldana reveals that Michael Saldana feared that whatever destroyed the Laymil might return to its system, and gave Tranquillity the means to escape that threat.

The Lady Macbeth journeys to Trafalgar and there reveal the events of their mission to the First Admiral, who is happy that the Alchemist has been destroyed and Alkad Mzu is no longer at large. Because Joshua Calvert knows the mechanics of the Alchemist he must not risk death due to the event his soul is brought back in a different body and is tortured/interrogated by the possessed about his knowledge of the Alchemist. After thoroughly debriefing the crew, the First Admiral allows them to travel on to Tranquillity. A meeting is held and Ione proposes that Tranquillity and the Jovian Consensus join forces to track down the Tyrathca Sleeping God and see what use it could be in the fight with the possessed. Syrinx and the voidhawk Oenone volunteer for the mission and Joshua Calvert agrees to take the Lady Macbeth on the mission. The Confederation Navy and the Kulu ESA also agree to support the venture. Because the mission will involve travelling several thousand light-years far outside Confederation territory, Lady Macbeth is authorised to use antimatter on this mission. The Confederation Navy has located the antimatter production facility that is fuelling Capone's Organisation. They allow Lady Macbeth to fuel up and then destroy it. The Organisation hellhawk Stryla observes the attack and notes that the Lady Macbeth jumped to the Tyrathca prime colony world in Confederation space, and delivers that information to the Organisation. Several Organisation ships are despatched to pursue and investigate.

On Ombey, the Liberation Campaign begins with a massive assault on Mortonridge by tens of thousands of regular troops and Edenist bitek soldiers. Although the campaign is costly, ground is won and thousands of the possessed are forcibly ejected from their hosts. Eventually the possessed fall back on a small patch of land at the tip of the peninsula and by combining their energistic powers are able to teleport the entire patch of land into a strange grey realm. The possessed and the attacking soldiers agree to a truce until they can work out how to survive in this strange place.

The Valisk habitat is trapped in yet another realm, nicknamed "the dark continuum". Energistic power is weak in this place, and entropic decay is far more powerful than normal. As a result, Valisk's energy is being lost into the 'dark continuum', as it has been named. Even worse, what energy it does manage to generate attracts the attention of monstrous, immortal, shape-shifting predators known as Orgathé, who attack the habitat with enthusiasm to feed on its power. There is a gravitational incline in this dimension which leads to a horrifying place called the Mélange, a liquid nitrogen–cold sea of beings trapped in this continuum, unable to accumulate enough energy to escape. Dariat escapes from Valisk in an escape pod with Tolton before it hits the Mélange and explodes, but they ponder that it is only a matter of time until the pod runs out of fuel and dissolves, forcing them to join the tortured beings outside.

The Confederation Navy research team discovers a possible way of killing the possessed, an 'anti-memory' device that will eradicate both the possessed and the possessing soul. The First Admiral is horrified about the weapon and even more horrified when President Haakar, panicking as the possession crisis spreads to more worlds, authorises its development. The scientists hope to create a more powerful version that will obliterate all of the tens of billions of souls in the beyond, which becomes a controversial idea among the Confederation government. Although the first weapon is completed, further research is suspended when a lone Organisation suicide attacker detonates an antimatter bomb right outside the habitat, irradiating it and destroying dozens of ships outside. The internal staff survive, but have to transfer their personnel and equipment to Avon. Furious, the First Admiral orders that the Organisation be permanently eradicated.

A fleet of over a thousand Confederation warships mobilises and attacks the worlds the Organisation have conquered, forcing them to withdraw back to New California. The other worlds, freed from the need to supply the Organisation with materials, are shifted out of the universe by their possessed populations.

Joshua Calvert and Syrinx begin their search for the Sleeping God by visiting the only known Tyrathca planet in the Confederation, breaking into the abandoned arkship in orbit around the planet, to determine the origin of the Tyrathca, whose original home planet appears to be on the far side of the Orion Nebula. On the way, however, the Tyrathca break into the arkship as well and pursue the expeditionary team, who also find evidence in the arkship's systems of prior use by the Kiint. The humans manage to escape by duplicating the manoeuvre of the blackhawk Udat, swallowing into a hollow chamber in the arkship and swallowing out again to extricate the expeditionary team.

On Earth, Louise Kavanagh returns to London after warning Banneth of Quinn Dexter's intention of killing her. It is eventually revealed that Quinn's actions had been discovered by a secret Govcentral security council named B7. They are in contact with Banneth and attempt to use her as bait, to lure Dexter out of hiding and then hit the building he is in with an orbital gamma laser. Quinn sees through their trap though, and arranges for a double of himself to be in the building while it is destroyed, thereby killing Banneth and the double, and making B7 think he is dead. His plan is foiled, though, by a person calling himself "a friend of Carter McBride" (the boy Laton killed to expose Quinn's cult on Lalonde), and B7 is once again on Quinn's tracks. Louise is summoned by a member of B7, the Western Europe Supervisor. He reveals to her the truth about B7: it is a consortium of incredibly wealthy individuals whose "financial institutions own a healthy percentage of the human race". They believe themselves to be immortal, as they use affinity to transfer their memories and personality into clone bodies to avoid death, in much the same way as Edenists (although the Kiint reveal that souls are different from "memory constructs", and that therefore they actually died every time their old bodies were destroyed, with their souls moving on). He also reveals that they were the actual cause behind the schism between Adamists and Edenists, which began as their attempt to keep bitek technology all for themselves (a plan that was foiled when Wing-Tsit Chong created Edenism). He arranges for Louise to meet up with Fletcher Christian in London. From there they would find Dexter and use the anti-memory device to kill him forever. The operation fails, and Louise finally confronts Quinn at St Paul's Cathedral in London, where he attempts to bring the Night to the Universe by opening a dimensional rift to summon "fallen angels" to Earth. The first creatures to emerge from it are none other than Dariat and Tolton (as the rift turns out to lead directly into the Mélange). A confrontation ensues, with Louise, Fletcher, Dariat, Tolton, and a returned-from-the-beyond Powel Manani (the friend of Carter McBride) faced off against the army of the possessed and the entities fleeing the Mélange.

The Lady Macbeth and Oenone continue on to the Tyrathca home system, now swallowed by a red giant. At first they believe the system is uninhabited, until they catch sight of dozens of habitats ringing the Red Giant. They contact the nearest and make contact with the Mosdva, who turn out to have once been the Tyrathca's slaves, being used to mine and build the ships and habitats since they were more versatile in zero gravity. The Lady Macbeth's arrival leads to a war breaking out amongst the dominions on the habitat, which ends when they gain a Tyrathca star map, and give the dominions their FTL technology. After a lengthy journey they find the Sleeping God, a naked singularity supplied by controlling vacuum energy. The Sleeping God was originally created to remove its creator race from the current universe, and was built to help sentient entities. It reveals, among other things, that souls remain trapped in the beyond because they are unable to accept their death; all souls are indeed destined for the Beyond, but those that let go travel through the time of the spaceless dimension to the "omega point", the end of the Universe where all souls combine into one and contribute to the nature of the next universe to be born. Joshua Calvert uses the god to return every stolen Confederation planet to the Universe, before moving them out of the Galaxy, altering the wormholes to remove the possessed. He also makes Quinn into a vessel for all of the human souls in the beyond, to transport them all to the Omega point instead of letting them suffer in eternal purgatory. He then gives himself affinity and returns to Tranquility, marries young girl Louise and settles down to live on Norfolk.

Numerous plot strands are also tied up in the closing pages, revealing Dariat's reunion with Anastasia in some unknown realm, the fate of the members of B7 and Andre Duchamp (who Joshua ironically strands on a penal planet), Ralph Hiltch's 'conversion' to Edenism, Syrinx reawakening Erik Thakrar, and the settling of the Hiltons on Norfolk.
