= The Face of the Waters =

1991 novel by Robert Silverberg

- Cover of first edition (hardcover)
- Author: Robert Silverberg
- Cover artist: Jim Burns
- Language: English
- Genre: Science fiction
- Publisher: Grafton
- Publication date: 1991
- Publication place: United States
- Media type: Print (Hardcover & Paperback)
- Pages: 363
- ISBN: 0-246-13718-5
- OCLC: 59782573

The Face of the Waters is a science fiction novel by American writer Robert Silverberg, first published in 1991.

== Plot introduction ==
The Face of the Waters takes place deep in the future, on a penal colony, inhabited by convicts and their progeny. The planet is Hydros, an ocean planet whose inhabitants live on artificial floating islands.

After a human offense against the natives of Hydros, the human population of the island of Sorve are ordered to leave. Forbidden on all other islands, in a flotilla of ships they seek the semi-mythical island of the Face of the Waters. During their journey they are forced to learn more about themselves, leading to questions about both religion and the purpose of Man. At the end of the novel Robert Silverberg addresses what it means to be human.
