= The Chosen (Pinto novel) =

1999 novel by Ricardo Pinto

- First edition
- Author: Ricardo Pinto
- Cover artist: Jim Burns
- Language: English
- Series: The Stone Dance of the Chameleon
- Genre: Fantasy
- Publisher: Bantam Books UK, a division of Random House
- Publication date: 1999
- Publication place: United Kingdom
- Media type: Print
- Pages: 712
- ISBN: 0-553-50581-5
- OCLC: 41547459
- Followed by: The Standing Dead

See The Chosen (disambiguation) for other than the novel

The Chosen is a 1999 fantasy novel by Ricardo Pinto. It is the first book in The Stone Dance of the Chameleon trilogy, which concerns the harrowing experiences of the young and inexperienced heir to a ruling dynasty who is suddenly taken from his protected childhood and thrust into a cruel society where he must fight for his family honour, his position and his life. A 2000 Locus poll ranked The Chosen 14th in the Best First Novel category.

== Development ==
Pinto has reported that he first wrote a 600-page draft of the series during the summer holiday while at university in the early 1980s. Ten years later he produced rewritten drafts for the second and third books of the series, before creating a 100-page synopsis of the first book, which was submitted to a publisher, Transworld. The book then took a further two years to complete.

Pinto reports that his writing style has changed through the writing of the series, so that while the final volume has been driven by its characters, the first was driven by its setting. His writing process is to create successive draft outlines for a book, each developing the actions and interaction of the characters and themes in the story in greater detail. The wildlife and setting of the books derived from an idea in the original draft that it would be set in late Cretaceous Antarctica. This also accounted for the day length of 23.6 hours and 396-day years used in the series, which would have been correct for the earth at that time.

The book has been criticised for being overly long, which in part is conceded by Pinto and put down by him to inexperience. However, he also says that the relevance of some information will become apparent in the final volume, and upon re-reading.

== Synopsis ==
The story concerns the move from boy to man of its hero, Carnelian, son of the Lord Suth. Formerly powerful and influential, Lord Suth is in exile far from Osrakum, capital of the Three Lands. His son has been brought up with only his father and immediate household, which though extensive is only a pale shadow of the extravagance and excesses of the court life normally experienced by a ruling Lord.

A delegation of lords comes to their island, asking that Suth will return to the capital and oversee the election of a new emperor, since the current one is dying. The emperor has two sons, and a choice must be made between them. Suth agrees, and Carnelian is thrown into a world of cruelty and indifference to the suffering of others. His home is torn apart to make repairs to the ship which brought the delegation. Most of the household are left behind, without the stores they would have needed to survive the winter. It is death for a common man to look upon the face of such a lord, and Carnelian has several sharp lessons in the laws of caste which govern this society. The journey to Osrakum is experienced by the reader through the impressions of Carnelian, as a stranger to the three lands.

Once at court, Carnelian again experiences the contrasts between the rich and powerful, and their inconsequential slaves. He becomes involved in the affairs of the two brothers contending for the throne. His position as an outsider and his father's position, initially as regent and then as arbiter of the election, makes him well placed to see the inner workings of the palace and to become a natural rulebreaker and explorer of secret places. He becomes allied to prince Osidian, who in a tight and vicious contest gains the greatest number of votes to become Emperor. Molochite, the other prince, is not the sort to accept such a loss. Carnelian and Osidian are abducted, making it impossible for Osidian to attend his own coronation and causing him to lose the election by default.
