= Great North Road (novel) =

2012 novel by Peter F. Hamilton

- First edition
- Author: Peter F. Hamilton
- Cover artist: Steve Stone
- Language: English
- Genre: Science fiction novel
- Publisher: Macmillan
- Publication date: 2012
- Publication place: United Kingdom
- Media type: Print (Hardcover)
- Pages: 976
- ISBN: 978-0-230-75005-0

Great North Road is a science fiction novel by Peter F. Hamilton. It was first published in 2012 by Macmillan. Jonathan Wright of SFX magazine said, "Peter F Hamilton’s latest novel may be a standalone tale (although there’s plenty of scope for sequels), but it’s a thuddingly imposing 1,100 pages in length. Not that it seems that way when you’re reading it. Balancing a multi-stranded plot, different exotic locales and a huge cast of characters, Hamilton plunges us straight into a murder mystery set in a near-future Newcastle, a city now adjacent to a portal to another world, the tropical St Libra."

== Synopsis ==
In AD 2142, where portal technology allows instantaneous travel to other planets, Newcastle police detective Sidney Hurst heads a high-tech investigation of the murder of a clone of the wealthy North family. Hurst has the added challenge of the politics and media associated with the high profile murder. The body shows the same wounds as that of Bartram North, murdered twenty years ago on the tropical planet St Libra. The bio-fuel that flows from St Libra is a mainstay of Earth's economy and so powerful vested interests are watching over Hurst's shoulder.

Angela Tramelo was convicted and jailed for that murder but it seems that her story of an alien attack might be true. Tramelo, who has not aged in her twenty years in prison, is released into the custody of the Human Defence Alliance and taken on an expedition via the Newcastle gateway to St Libra.

== Criticism and reviews ==
- SFX review : "Great North Road builds confidently towards a conclusion that’s arguably a little too neat, but that doesn’t lessen the achievement here"
- Guardian review : "Great North Road is vast ... the author controls a cast numbering more than 50, multiple complex plot-lines, ... and arrives at a dénouement that is far more than just the resolution of a murder mystery."
- Upcoming4.me review : "Beautiful and complex story by grandmaster of intelligent science fiction."
