= Lightship (book) =

Lightship is a book by Jim Burns and Chris Evans published in 1985.

== Plot summary ==
Lightship is a book of 120 color paintings by Jim Burns.

== Reception ==
Dave Langford reviewed Lightship for White Dwarf #80, and stated that "classy colour paintings by our very own Jim Burns, who has either a spherical-breasted model or an enthusiastic imagination."

== Reviews ==
- Review by Chris Morgan (1986) in Fantasy Review, June 1986.
- Review by Dan Chow (1986) in Locus, #306 July 1986.
