= The Standing Dead =

2002 novel by Ricardo Pinto

- Author: Ricardo Pinto
- Cover artist: Jim Burns
- Language: English
- Series: The Stone Dance of the Chameleon
- Genre: Fantasy
- Publisher: Bantam Books UK, a division of Random House
- Publication date: 2002
- Publication place: United Kingdom
- Media type: Print
- Pages: 729
- ISBN: 0-553-81285-8
- OCLC: 59331866
- Preceded by: The Chosen
- Followed by: The Third God

The Standing Dead is a 2002 fantasy novel by Ricardo Pinto. It is the second book in The Stone Dance of the Chameleon trilogy, which concerns the harrowing experiences of the young and inexperienced heir to a ruling dynasty who is suddenly taken from his protected childhood and thrust into a cruel society where he must fight for his family honour, his position and his life.

The story explores the relationship between its two principal characters, Osidian and Carnelian, as Osidian moves from suicidal despondency at the loss of his throne to a singleminded and ruthless quest for revenge.

== Synopsis ==
Carnelian, son and heir to Lord Suth, and prince Osidian have been abducted, drugged and smuggled out of the capital of the three lands, Osrakum, in funeral urns. Carnelian is awakened by a would-be grave robber seeking spoils in the urns. The robber is immediately placed in the dilemma of having looked upon the face of one of the exalted chosen lords, for which the penalty is death, of killing them and risking eventual discovery and death, of being caught in the inevitable hunt for such exalted missing persons and being executed, or fleeing far from the capital with his captives in the hope of selling them as valuable slaves. He chooses the latter as his only chance of survival and thus Carnelian and Osidian are set upon a very different course than Osidians anticipated coronation. Osidian having failed to appear at the coronation, his brother Molochite would automatically be made emperor instead. As mortal brother to the new divine emperor, Osidian would take Molochite's place as blood sacrifice.

Carnelian and Osidian are bound and disguised and marched away from the capital. Osidian is in worse shape than Carnelian, so that Carnelian must make the difficult choices of attempting their escape. Carnelian has a possibility of escape and return to the capital, but either abandoning Osidian or bringing him back would mean his inevitable death. Instead he seizes the opportunity of an attack by nomad tribesmen to transfer them to captivity with the tribesmen, instead of the slavers. As the party returns to the plains which are home to the ochre tribe, Osidian recovers somewhat and his reckless determination defending the party from wild animals, plus his navigational skills and knowledge of the plains drawn from his unconventional and privileged education, impresses the tribesmen. Some of them start to defer to Osidian both as a clearly recognisable member of the ruling race which they have been taught to fear, and as a natural replacement for the dead leaders of their party.

The tribesmen return to their village, where a combination of fast talking by Carnelian (whose family had a number of plainsmen as slaves), and growing respect for Osidian mean they are allowed to live as part of the village. Carnelian is accepting of their new life, but Osidian is at first suicidal, but then vengeful. He embarks on a plan to recover his position and sets about manipulating the tribesmen to his ends. By a number of staged encounters, he sets tribesmen from different villages against each other, until he controls a steadily growing warband. This he intends to use as the start of an army to wage war against his brother.
