= Chosen =

Chosen or The Chosen may refer to:

== Books ==
- Chosen (Dekker novel), a 2007 novel by Ted Dekker
- Chosen (Cast novel), a novel in the House of Night fantasy series
- Chosen (Image Comics), a comic book series by Mark Millar
- The Chosen (Karabel book), a book by Jerome Karabel
- The Chosen (Pinto novel), a 1999 novel by Ricardo Pinto
- The Chosen (Potok novel), a 1967 novel by Chaim Potok
- The Chosen, a 1997 novel by L. J. Smith

== Film and television ==
=== Film ===
- Chosen (2016 film), by Jasmin Dizdar, a World War II thriller set in Hungary
- The Chosen (1981 film), a film based on Potok's novel
- The Chosen (2015 film), a film starring YouTube personality Kian Lawley
- The Chosen (2016 film), by Antonio Chavarrías, based on the murder of Leon Trotsky in 1940
- Holocaust 2000, also released as The Chosen, a 1977 horror film starring Kirk Douglas

=== Television ===
- Chosen (American TV series), 2013 streaming TV series on Crackle
- The Chosen (TV series), 2017 series by Dallas Jenkins based on the life of Jesus Christ
- Chosen (Danish TV series), a 2022 streaming TV series on Netflix
- "Chosen" (Buffy the Vampire Slayer), an episode of Buffy the Vampire Slayer
- "Chosen" (Once Upon a Time), an episode of Once Upon a Time
- "Chosen" (The Twilight Zone), an episode of The Twilight Zone

== Music ==
- Chosen (album), an album by Vanessa Bell Armstrong
- Chosen (EP), an extended play by Måneskin
- "Chosen" (Måneskin song), 2017
- "Chosen" (Blxst song), 2020
- "The Chosen", a song by Unearth from the album The March, 2008
- The Chosen (album), by Enterprise Earth, 2022

== Places ==
- Hosen, a moshav in northern Israel
- Chōsen, the Japanese name for Korea
  - for the state of Joseon (1392–1897)
  - for Korea under Japanese rule (1910–1945)
  - for North Korea (北朝鮮, Kita Chōsen) (since 1949)
- Chosen, Florida

== Other uses ==
- Chosen people, people who believe they have been chosen by a higher power to do a certain thing including
  - Jews as the chosen people
- Blood II: The Chosen, sequel to the video game Blood

== See also ==
- The Chosen One (disambiguation)
- Battle of Chosin Reservoir, November–December 1950, part of the Korean War
- Chozen (disambiguation)
