= Commonwealth Saga =

Space opera novel series by Peter F. Hamilton

- Pandora's Star; Judas Unchained
- Author: Peter F. Hamilton
- Country: UK
- Language: English
- Genre: science fiction
- Publisher: UK: Macmillan Publishers; US: Random House/Del Rey Books
- Published: 2004
- No. of books: 2
- Preceded by: Misspent Youth
- Followed by: Void Trilogy
- Website: Author page at Pan Macmillan UK

The Commonwealth Saga is a series of science fiction novels by British science fiction writer Peter F. Hamilton. This saga consists of the novels Pandora's Star (2004) and Judas Unchained (2005). Hamilton has also written several books set in the same literary universe. Misspent Youth (2002) takes place 340 years before the events of Pandora's Star. The Void Trilogy, consisting of The Dreaming Void (2008), The Temporal Void (2009), and The Evolutionary Void (2010), takes place 1,200 years after the events of Judas Unchained; several of the main characters from Judas Unchained and Pandora's Star also appear in the Void trilogy.

Two additional novels, set in the time 263 years before and five years after "The Void Trilogy", were released in 2014 (The Abyss Beyond Dreams) and 2016 (A Night Without Stars).

Like Hamilton's earlier The Night's Dawn Trilogy, the Commonwealth Saga is an epic space opera that extends across dozens of worlds and characters.

== Plot ==
=== Pandora's Star ===
Pandora's Star
- UK edition cover
- Author: Peter F. Hamilton
- Cover artist: Jim Burns
- Language: English
- Series: The Commonwealth Saga
- Genre: Science fiction
- Publisher: Pan Macmillan (UK) & Del Rey (US)
- Publication date: 2004
- Publication place: United Kingdom
- Pages: 882 (UK hardcover), 1,152 (UK paperback)
- ISBN: 0-330-49331-0
- OCLC: 57201315
- Followed by: Judas Unchained

The book opens with a short section providing backstory. As part of the first mission to Mars, a team of astronauts exits their spacecraft for the first time, only to see another man standing there, connected to an air hose that leads through a wormhole to a laboratory in California. The wormhole generator's inventors, Nigel Sheldon and Ozzie Isaac, chose to test it by beating the crew, by moments, to become the first humans to reach Mars. The saga then moves into the Commonwealth era in 2380, when humanity has used the wormhole technology to colonise several hundred planets across hundreds of light years.

On a distant planet, astronomer Dudley Bose performs the first detailed observations of a mysterious astronomical event known as the Dyson Pair Enclosure. Two stars, located roughly 1,000 light years from Earth (750 light years from the edge of Commonwealth space), disappeared some time in the past. The theory is that they have been enclosed inside Dyson spheres.

Bose's investigations reveal that the enclosing of Dyson Alpha and Dyson Beta (as the stars become known) occurred quickly and simultaneously. This implies that the technology of the Dyson aliens, or possibly of other unknown aliens, surpasses that of the Commonwealth; furthermore, did the Dyson Aliens enclose themselves, or did some other force enclose them? Was it for protection or to protect those outside the spheres?

To investigate, the Commonwealth builds its first interstellar ship, the Second Chance. Lacking contemporary astronauts, it gives the command to Wilson Kime, one of the members of the original Mars mission. Using a self-enclosed "flowing" wormhole for propulsion, the Second Chance travels to Dyson Alpha.

When the Second Chance arrives and begins to explore what appears to be an enclosure generator, an unknown mechanism shuts it down and the barrier around the star disappears. Formerly imprisoned inside is an extremely warlike and aggressive species, a race that comes to be called "the Primes". They consist of intelligent "immotiles" that breed and control vast armies of sub-sentient "motiles" via electronically extended neural interfaces. The few immotiles constantly vie with each other for territories and resources, and by the time of the story, the strongest uses the technology gleaned by analysis of the human's wormhole-generation techniques to destroy all the other Prime immotiles and thus become the only one remaining Prime: MorningLightMountain.

Primes had previously colonised the planetary system referred to as Dyson Beta using slower-than-light starships and had committed genocide against its native inhabitants in the process. Disconnected from their originating immotile groupings, and provided with novel biological forms, Beta's Primes started to routinely alter themselves through genetic manipulation and mechanical augmentation. This was an anathema to the Alpha Primes, who referred to them as AlienPrimes. With Beta's Primes no longer under the control of Alpha's Primes, a war began between the two systems. The war appears to have continued until forces unknown erected the barrier around the stars.

After capturing two crew members of the Second Chance (one of them Bose, which should have committed suicide after having destroyed his implants and his brain, but did not), MorningLightMountain discovers the location of the Commonwealth and the wormhole-generation techniques. Upon learning of the Commonwealth's existence, MorningLightMountain makes it its primary objective to destroy it. Having been in almost continual combat for its entire evolution, MorningLightMountain believes that it is necessary to eliminate all other life in the Universe to secure its survival into the distant future; it views all life that is not under its control as a potential threat.

Hamilton weaves several other stories into the main narrative of the Prime encounter. Among these is that of the ancient spacecraft Marie (sic) Celeste, found crashed on one of the Commonwealth planets, Far Away. An enigmatic figure, Bradley Johansson, claims the original passenger of the spacecraft is alive, an alien he calls the Starflyer. He claims that it is using mind-controlled agents to manipulate events in the Commonwealth, and that it caused the events that led to the discovery of the Primes. The Commonwealth forces dismiss Johansson as a crazy terrorist, and his attempts to interfere with the voyage to Dyson Alpha are thwarted.

=== Judas Unchained ===
Judas Unchained
- First edition (UK)
- Author: Peter F. Hamilton
- Cover artist: Jim Burns
- Language: English
- Series: The Commonwealth Saga
- Genre: Science fiction
- Publisher: Pan Macmillan (UK) & Del Rey (US)
- Publication date: 2005
- Publication place: United Kingdom
- Media type: Print
- Pages: 949 (UK hardcover), 1,230 (UK paperback)
- ISBN: 0-330-49353-1
- Preceded by: Pandora's Star

Judas Unchained, the second part of the Commonwealth Saga, picks up where Pandora's Star ends.

The story begins with the small human resistance that exists on what remains of the Commonwealth worlds attacked by the Primes. Human resistance forces have found two ways to fight back: using the Prime weapons (primarily directed-energy weapons) against the invaders, and disrupting communication between the slave caste (motiles) and the commanding caste (immotiles) of the Primes. Meanwhile, the humans in the remaining Commonwealth pursue other plans: to develop a set of weapons and warships to defend against the next Prime invasion and force the conflict back into Prime space; to develop a "quantumbuster superweapon" based on technology supplied, unbeknownst to most humans, by the Starflyer; and to prepare for the evacuation of known space altogether if necessary.

Eventually, the human forces decide that there can be no other solution to the conflict than to commit genocide and destroy the Primes entirely. However, it is revealed that the Primes are planning a much larger invasion, which humanity will be all but powerless to stop.

As the war rages, the human forces begin to build much faster, better armed ships and fitting them with new "quantumbuster" weapons that can destroy an entire planet. Later on, a more advanced quantumbuster is deployed, which is capable of inducing a main-sequence star to go nova. Despite the original plan to use it on the Dyson Alpha star and thus kill the entire prime race, a modified field version of a normal quantumbuster is eventually deployed on the Dyson Alpha forcefield generator, destroying the mechanism that was interfering with the generator's systems. This allows the mechanism to reactivate, trapping the Prime aliens inside and avoiding genocide.

Meanwhile, the Commonwealth forces slowly realize that Johansson is correct, and that the Starflyer is an AlienPrime that escaped the enclosure event. After crashing on Far Away, it has been plotting how to destroy both the Alpha Primes as well as dangerous humanity by manipulating events to force both races to commit mutual genocide. Beta Primes would then become the dominant lifeforms. Through a long trail of companies, it funded Bose's "discovery" of the enclosure and snuck agents aboard Second Chance with a device to deactivate the enclosure generator.

As the Starflyer attempts to return to Beta, human forces engage in a desperate chase to prevent it from escaping. Their forces fail, but Johansson's Guardians of Selfhood have been preparing for this event, marshalling the weather of the entire planet and unleashing a massive directed hurricane that destroys the Starflyer's ship. Johansson is aboard the Marie Celeste, and prepares to kill the Starflyer.

== In the same universe ==
- Misspent Youth
- Void Trilogy
- The Chronicle of the Fallers
