= The Third God =

2009 novel by Ricardo Pinto

- Author: Ricardo Pinto
- Cover artist: Jim Burns
- Language: English
- Series: The Stone Dance of the Chameleon
- Genre: Fantasy
- Publisher: Bantam Books UK, a division of Random House
- Publication date: 27 March 2009
- Publication place: United Kingdom
- Media type: Print (hardback)
- Pages: 704 pp
- ISBN: 978-0-593-05051-4
- OCLC: 276648049
- Preceded by: The Standing Dead

The Third God is a 2009 fantasy novel by Ricardo Pinto. It is the third book in The Stone Dance of the Chameleon trilogy, which concerns the harrowing experiences of the young and inexperienced heir to a ruling dynasty who is suddenly taken from his protected childhood and thrust into a cruel society where he must fight for his family honour, his position and his life.

The Third God continues the story of Carnelian and the would-be God Emperor Osidian, who has raised a barbarian army and now seeks revenge on those who stripped him of his rightful inheritance and left him for dead.

Pinto said that though the novel had been published in the United Kingdom and Portugal, he had been "bitterly disappointed" when both his US and German publishers had decided not to publish it. He noted, "When it came out, it was barely reviewed, and it felt to me as if, after spending years creating a ship, it had slid down the slipway, and sank with barely a trace. I had hoped for more."

== Description ==
"This is the final book in a series of three. Some series become formulaic with the same characters going over the same ground on the way to a final victory, but not this one. It is definitely one story in three parts. The first in the series is perhaps the most nearly a traditional fantasy epic, with the unsuspecting hero growing into his role as a master of the Guarded Land and taking part in the election of the new god-emperor...before everything comes apart. The second recounts time in exile in the Earthsky where our heroes forge an army out of the barbarian tribes. This book recounts their return to the Guarded Land and final battle to recover their birthright. The book could just about be read as a complete story, but much relies upon a knowledge of the previous books to be fully appreciated.

Yet this is not a conventional fantasy. It is set in a wholly barbaric land, where the ruling Masters are truly masters of their art of inflicting suffering. The whole story is told from the perspective of Carnelian, who in the first book has to come to terms with violence, maiming and death being visited on his family and those he has grown up with, having been raised by his father in exile and thus been sheltered from the casual violence of the society he has inherited to rule. In the second, he experiences the lot of a slave, being cast out together with Osidian (who was brought up at court so is thoroughly versed in the best of Masterly sadistic intrigue) before building a following amongst the plains people, leaving a steadily growing wake of death as they go. In the third the massed armies of the guarded land, together with all the weapons of destruction the Masters could devise are brought together with predictable results of death on an even greater scale than before.

All this death and violence will be off-putting for some readers, yet it is used through Carnelian's reaction against it as a cry against the horrors of war. The rising tide of destruction is an object lesson in unforeseen consequences and the risks of carelessly destroying all you hold dear through the singleminded pursuit of some goal.

Carnelian has to make choices as he tries to support yet also restrain Osidian's determination to return to power. The plot has a number of turning points, including the deaths of a number of central characters.

There is a love story woven through it, which once again is an assertion of the triumph of fundamental humanity against impossible obstacles."
