= Mindstar Rising =

1993 novel by Peter F. Hamilton

- First edition
- Author: Peter F. Hamilton
- Cover artist: Jim Burns
- Language: English
- Genre: Science fiction
- Publisher: Pan Books
- Publication date: 1993
- Publication place: United Kingdom
- Media type: Print (paperback)
- Pages: 438
- ISBN: 0-330-32376-8
- Followed by: A Quantum Murder

Mindstar Rising is a science fiction novel by British writer Peter F. Hamilton, published in 1993. It is the first book in the Greg Mandel trilogy. The novel introduces the major characters in the series, most notably Greg and Julia Evans. The novel combines elements of classic detective novels with science fiction.

== Plot summary ==
The focus of the novel is the growth of the company Event Horizon, founded by Julia's grandfather Philip Evans. Beset by industrial saboteurs, the company seeks help in the form of ex–Mindstar Brigade soldier turned private detective Greg Mandel. The company is leading the way in rebuilding a twenty-first-century England after the People's Socialist Party (PSP), a tyrannical communist government, had first crushed the country and then collapsed, leaving it in shambles. Initially hired to solve a mystery involving missing stocks from a zero-g satellite production facility, he is then re-hired to find the source of attacks on a stored personality of Philip Evans after the industrialist's death.

== The Event Horizon trilogy ==
Greg Mandel is the lead character in Mindstar Rising, plus two subsequent novels and a novella by Peter F. Hamilton. All the stories feature Mandel, Julia Evans and the company Event Horizon.

The stories are set in a near-future England, centred on Hamilton's own home county of Rutland. Mandel is a former officer of the "English Army", who fought in the "Mindstar Brigade", a tactical psychic unit. He was given the psychic powers of intuition and detecting emotions, skills he uses for his new profession of psychic detective.

The stories are set in a Britain recovering from the damages suffered during ten years of "Marxist-Maoist" dictatorship under the People's Socialist Party and also the ravages of global warming and collapsing financial markets.

After three highly successful novels featuring Mandel had launched his career, Hamilton only briefly returned to him for the novella The Suspect Genome. The Suspect Genome was published in Interzone in 2000 and was winner of the British Science Fiction Association Award for best short in 2001. Apart from this, Hamilton otherwise moved on to writing quite different books. The author said in 1996, that "Greg was a very good start for me and people have enjoyed it and I think: "leave it at that".

== Release details ==
- Hamilton, Peter F. Mindstar Rising. London: Pan Books, 1993. ISBN 0-330-32376-8 (paperback, first edition).
