= The Neutronium Alchemist =

1997 SF novel by Peter F. Hamilton

- First edition
- Author: Peter F. Hamilton
- Cover artist: Jim Burns
- Language: English
- Series: The Night's Dawn Trilogy
- Genre: Science fiction
- Publisher: Macmillan Publishers
- Publication date: 20 October 1997
- Publication place: United Kingdom
- Media type: Print (hardback & paperback)
- Pages: 999
- ISBN: 0-333-66935-5
- OCLC: 60136648
- Preceded by: The Reality Dysfunction
- Followed by: The Naked God

The Neutronium Alchemist is a science fiction novel by British writer Peter F. Hamilton, the second book in The Night's Dawn Trilogy. It follows on from The Reality Dysfunction and precedes The Naked God. It was published in the United Kingdom by Macmillan Publishers on 20 October 1997. The first United States edition, which is broken into two volumes, Consolidation and Conflict, followed in April and May 1998 from Time Warner Books. The second US edition, as a single volume, was published in December 2008 by Orbit Books. This novel, along with others in the series, is noted for its length (more than 1,000 pages long in paperback) and technological depth.

== Background ==
In The Reality Dysfunction, the presence of an energy-based alien lifeform during the death of a human on the colony world of Lalonde somehow 'jammed open' the interface between this universe and 'the beyond', an energistic vacuum where the souls of dead humans (and possibly other races) have become trapped after death. They are able to cross back over into this universe and possess the living, gaining tremendous strength, agility and the ability to create and alter matter. They overrun the planet Lalonde in a matter of weeks and spread beyond to the planets Atlantis and Norfolk and to the independent habitat Valisk, among others. The Kulu Kingdom colony world of Ombey is also infiltrated and a veteran of the Lalonde fiasco, Ralph Hiltch, is drafted in to help contain the menace. At the end of The Reality Dysfunction the truth of the nature of the threat is discovered by several survivors of a botched attempt to rescue the situation on Lalonde. However, a second threat has also emerged. Dr. Alkad Mzu, creator of the feared 'Alchemist' weapon of mass destruction, has escaped from Tranquillity and apparently seeks revenge on Omuta, the world that destroyed her own home planet of Garissa thirty years earlier.

== Plot summary ==
The voidhawk Oenone reaches Jupiter and docks with one of the 4,250 habitats orbiting the planet. Whilst medical assistance and trauma counselling begin to help heal Syrinx, the information from Laton and the events on Atlantis is transmitted to the Jovian Consensus. As they become aware of the scale of the crisis, the Edenists immediately switch their economy to a war footing, rendering Jupiter space impregnable to attack. They also develop personality-query systems which should render all Edenists, voidhawks and habitats immune to possession. They detach a quarter of the voidhawk fleet and assign it to reinforce the Confederation Navy. Admiral Aleksandrovich summons an emergency session of the Confederation Assembly on its meeting world of Avon.

On Avon the Confederation Assembly is stunned to learn of the threat from the possessed. The Confederation Navy shuts down all interstellar flights to contain the threat and goes to its highest state of alert. In a startling move, the Tyrathca immediately cut themselves off from all contact with humanity for the duration of the crisis. The Kiint ambassador reveals that, many thousands of years ago, they also suffered a 'possession crisis', as the secret of death is one that is eventually discovered by all sentient races. They claim that their solution to the crisis is not applicable to humanity, who must find their own way.

Alkad Mzu departs from the blackhawk Udat, leaving behind a virus in its jump system which causes the destruction of Udat whilst making a wormhole transit. She does this both to protect knowledge of her whereabouts and also as revenge: Udat was one of the blackhawks which crippled the Beezling just before the Garissan Genocide.

On the planet Norfolk, the possessed succeed in over-running most of the planet. Louise Kavanagh's father, Grant, is possessed and gives up his home estate to forces loyal to Quinn Dexter. However, Dexter's attempts to have Louise and her sister Genevieve possessed are thwarted by another possessed, who assists Louise and Genevieve in reaching the nearest aerodrome. He reveals his name – Fletcher Christian – and vows to protect them from those who mean them harm. He bemoans the lack of chivalry and honour among his fellow returnees. They flee to the capital, which is in danger of falling, and briefly find refuge with Louise's cousins, the Hewsons. One of the cousins, Roberto, attempts to rape Louise, but fortunately is thwarted. After this, with her parents declared missing, Louise takes control of the Kavanagh fortune and is able to use this to book passage on a starship fleeing the system for Earth. They end up on a ship owned by SII (Mars' national company) and eventually reach High York, an asteroid in the O'Neill Halo in orbit above Earth. Christian's true nature is detected and he, Louise and Genevieve are all arrested.

On Ombey Ralph Hiltch assists the local police and military in tracking down the possessed from Lalonde. Princess Kirsten authorises the use of lethal force and, in a move which establishes a precedent across the Confederation, the planet's own strategic defence platforms are turned against the possessed, destroying an aircraft and several buses carrying them. One bus manages to get onto Mortonridge, a hilly peninsula, and the entire human population of nearly two million is possessed. SD platforms and the military manage to seal off the peninsula, containing the possessed in this one area. The leader of the possessed, Annette Ekelund, agrees to a cessation of hostilities until a more permanent solution to the crisis is found. However, the Kulu Kingdom is unwilling to look inactive whilst its citizens are in danger, and contingency plans are made. Hiltch visits Kulu itself and is shocked to learn that there was an outbreak of possession in Nova Kong, the capital, but it was put down hard by the authorities. King Alastair agrees to authorise an alliance with the Edenists, who will provide bitek soldiers to help retake Mortonridge. They know now that the possessed fear zero-tau and plan to use thousands of zero-tau pods to force the possessed to give up their bodies. The campaign will likely be bloody, but the Confederation badly needs a victory.

Joshua Calvert and the crew of the Lady MacBeth return to Tranquillity with news of events on Lalonde. Kelly Tirrel becomes an overnight celebrity for her reports of the conflict on Lalonde, and the children rescued from the planet are well-treated in the habitat's children's home. Ione asks Joshua Calvert to take his ship and pursue Alkad Mzu and Udat wherever they have gone. Ione believes that the Alchemist may pose as great a threat as the possessed. Joshua reluctantly agrees. Before he departs, Father Horst Elwes relates to him a story about how he was able to 'exorcise' a possessing spirit on Lalonde and tells Joshua to have faith.

On New California a few possessed manage to get loose on the planet, but they are disorganised and unable to make much headway. One of the possessed appears to be a raving lunatic, but as the days pass the possessing soul's presence in a normally-functioning brain restore his sanity and his memory. The possessing soul turns out to be Al Capone, a famed gangster from 20th century Chicago. Capone organises the possessed and they take over the planet in a matter of weeks. Capone realises they need to keep the planet's economy and starship-building capability going to defend themselves from any counter-attack, so many citizens are spared from possession (the act of which interferes with electrical systems nearby) as long as they contribute to the expansion of Capone's 'Organisation'. The interstellar superstar Jezebelle (a singer and 'mood-fantasy' artist) is on the planet at the time and she rapidly becomes Capone's lover, but also proves to be a valuable source of intelligence on the Confederation. The Organisation spreads to another planet and its ships begin causing problems for the Confederation Navy. First Admiral Samual Aleksandrovich learns that the Organisation's next conquest will be the planet Toi Hoi and develops a plan to intercept and destroy their fleet there.

Quinn Dexter leaves Norfolk and travels to Earth, hoping to infiltrate the arcologies there. However, Earth's defences and security measures are far too strong for him to penetrate. He instead travels to a planet called Nyvan, one of the earliest colonies founded before the policy of ethnic-streaming colonies came into effect. As a result, the planet is locked in a permanent state of cold war. Dexter effectively takes over one of the orbital asteroids. During his conquest he discovers it is possible to shift his body into a 'ghost realm', where he finds more dead souls. They claim that when someone dies only some are trapped in a beyond, whilst others become locked in a ghost-like state. Although he has no use for the ghosts, Dexter realises he can use this new ability to break through Earth's security again.

In the Valisk habitat, the possessed, aided by Dariat, become organised and swiftly take over much of the habitat. Rubra, the personality controlling the habitat, tries to reason with Dariat to little avail. Kiera, the leader of the possessed on Valisk (and the possessor of Marie Skibbow), travels to New California and is able to secure an alliance with the Organisation. Thanks to Dariat's knowledge of bitek systems, he is able to arrange for several dozen blackhawks to be possessed. The resulting 'hellhawks' become a valuable asset and Kiera is able to sell their skills to the Organisation. However, Dariat becomes gradually opposed to the possessed, due to their brutal tactics and penchant for destruction. He decides to side with Rubra, helps some of the non-possessed population to evacuate, and then merges his personality with Rubra's in the neural strata. The resulting blast of energy ends the threat of the possessed but also rips Valisk out of the material universe and into a strange realm of grey mists. Dariat is horrified to wake up and discover that he is now a ghost.

At Jupiter, Syrinx recovers from her injuries. She visits Eden, the original habitat, where the personality of Wing-Tsit Chong, Edenism's founder, lives on in the habitat's neural strata. With his guidance, Syrinx is able to overcome both the trauma of her experience and also her prejudice against Adamists. Syrinx and Oenone begin flying again and are assigned to a Confederation Navy squadron commanded by Rear-Admiral Meredith Saldana, which is assigned to the upcoming Toi Hoi interception mission. Saldana's squadron travels to Tranquillity, where Ione Saldana agrees – reluctantly – to let them use the habitat as a staging ground for the attack.

On Trafalgar, the Confederation Navy HQ asteroid orbiting Avon, a possessed prisoner demands a hearing to confirm her human rights and stop the Navy personnel running tests on her. However, she nearly escapes during the hearing and manages to have several other people possessed, one of whom has knowledge of the Toi Hoi operation. She re-kills this individual, and then surrenders to the staff.

At New California the possessing soul from Trafalgar manages to get reincarnated and warns Capone of the Toi Hoi ambush. Capone prepares his own plan in response.

In Tranquillity the Kiint researchers at the Ruin Ring project become intrigued by reports reaching them about a Tyrathca religion they previously did not know about (when one of the children from Lalonde tells a Kiint youth about it). They acquire the relevant data about the Sleeping God from Kelly Tirrel. Tranquillity observes this and Tirrel gives Ione a copy of the data. Ione is puzzled – the Tyrathca are a notably unimaginative species and have no need for supernatural deities – but her advisors suggest that the Sleeping God is actually a real entity who was able to aid the Tyrathca centuries ago, and may be able to aid humanity now against the threat of the possessed.

Joshua Calvert's hunt for Mzu and the Alchemist takes him to several worlds and asteroid settlements. On Ayachuko asteroid, in the Dorados, he is shocked to discover that he has a half-brother, Liol, the result of a liaison between Joshua's father Marcus and a local woman nearly thirty years ago. With possessed loosed on Ayachucko, Joshua agrees to let Liol depart with them. Joshua is attacked by a possessed but his attempt to 'exorcise' him as per Elwes' instruction fails, apparently because the possessing spirit was a Sunni Muslim and has no fear of Joshua's crucifix. Joshua and his crew manage to escape. Mzu's trail leads them to Nyvan. Joshua's pursuit is hampered by agents from the Edenist Intelligence service (led by Samual) and the Kulu External Security Agency (led by Monica Foulkes) who have surprisingly joined forces in their own pursuit of Mzu. Possessed loosed on Nyvan have also learned of Mzu's weapon and are searching for her. The pursuit culminates in a showdown at an iron yard. Joshua and his companions survive thanks to the intervention of a man with strange abilities named Dick Keaton, and are able to extract Mzu safely, although they also have to pick up Monica and Samual. Dexter destroys an orbital asteroid with nuclear bombs, causing a rain of asteroid chunks to fall on and annihilate the planet's biosphere. Satisfied with the chaos he has caused, Dexter departs for Earth. He abandons his comrades, slips into the ghost realm to evade security, and reappears in the space elevator descending towards the planet.

Safely aboard Joshua's ship Mzu explains how thirty years ago she and other Garrisan starships were on a mission to deploy the Alchemist when they were ambushed and left for dead by Omutan hired blackhawks (as portrayed in the first chapter of The Reality Dysfunction). They were left with two badly damaged ships, one with an active ZTT drive and the other without. With a difficult decision ahead, they decided to place 30 crewmembers in zero-tau and the Alchemist on the damaged Beezling, and send them to the nearest uninhabited star two and a half light-years away at sub-light speed (9% the speed of light due to the lack of a ZTT drive), what would be a 28-year journey. Mzu and others escaped via ZTT jump on the remaining ship with the intentions of rendezvousing with the Beezling upon its arrival in 28 years.

Mzu finally reveals the location coordinates of the uninhabited star that the Beezling is now orbiting and Joshua and his crew race to the star with the intentions of intercepting and destroying the Alchemist. Upon their arrival they discover the Alchemist and the Beezling with most of its crew intact. During the rescue Joshua's ship is ambushed by two Organization hellhawks that pursued them from Nyvan. Finding himself greatly outmaneuvered, Joshua pulls off a daring stunt by deploying the Alchemist into a nearby gas giant causing it to go nova, destroying the two Organization ships. Joshua meanwhile uses his ship's anti-matter drive to safely accelerate away from the nova at forty-two gees to a distance where they can make a proper ZTT jump.

With knowledge of the Confederation's Toi Hoi assault fleet grouping and refuelling at Tranquility, the Organisation fleet, aided by a large number of hellhawks, stages a massive assault on Tranquillity, surrounding the habitat and its few blackhawk mercenary and Confederation Navy defenders. They demand Tranquillity's immediate surrender. When Ione hesitates, they launch over 5,000 anti-matter weapons at the habitat.

Later, when Lady Macbeth arrives at Mirchusko, they find a vast radioactive dead zone where Tranquillity used to be. However, there is insufficient debris or disintegrated matter in orbit to suggest the station was destroyed. Its fate is unknown.

The story concludes in The Naked God.

== Notes ==
This novel features two appearances by actual historical figures among the possessed. Fletcher Christian, who led the mutiny on the Bounty, and 1930s American gangster Al Capone, both have prominent storylines. There is also a comedic interlude between two men both claiming to be Elvis Presley, although the implication is that both are merely Elvis impersonators.

Two lengthy subplots were cut from the novel. Taking place on Srinagar, the Hindu-ethnic planet in the same system as Valisk, this would have had an army of possessed conquering the planet with bitek constructs. The second plot would have involved Louise and Genevieve's ship crash-landing on Mars. Both plots were dropped for space reasons.
