= Fallen Dragon =

2001 novel by Peter F. Hamilton

- First edition
- Author: Peter F. Hamilton
- Cover artist: Jim Burns
- Language: English
- Genre: Science fiction
- Publisher: Macmillan
- Publication date: 2001
- Publication place: United Kingdom
- Media type: Print (hardcover)
- ISBN: 0-330-48006-5
- OCLC: 49394642

Fallen Dragon is a science fiction novel by British writer Peter F. Hamilton. It was first published in 2001 by Macmillan. It follows the adventures of the mercenary Lawrence Newton as he attempts to capture what he believes is a fabulous treasure, only to find something of much greater importance.

== Synopsis ==
Fallen Dragon takes place during the 25th century. In the preceding centuries, a means of Faster-than-light (FTL) space travel was discovered, allowing a speed of one-half of a light-year per day. This led to a series of colonization efforts in a radius of about 70 light years around Sol, but these ended as their costs proved prohibitive. The only major ongoing starflight efforts are carried out by the Zantiu-Braun megacorporation, who use their fleet of starships to periodically plunder their colonies in technically legal "asset realization" raids, typically involving military occupation of the planet in question. As it is cheaper to copy technology than ship it, these efforts normally collect single samples of interesting goods, or raw materials that are expensive on Earth. Zantiu-Braun is controlled by clones of Simon Roderick, who is motivated by the idea of uplifting the entire human race to his ideal.

The story follows the life of Lawrence Newton from the colony planet Amethi, both in the current timeframe and in a series of flashbacks. In the current time, Newton is a mercenary in the Zantiu-Braun strategic security forces, who leads a squad of troopers wearing organic armour suits called "Skin" that render them practically invulnerable.

As a teenager, Newton lived on the planet Amethi and is the oldest son of one of the most powerful members of the board of the corporation which controls the planet. Lawrence dreams about being a starship pilot, despite being told by his father that starship exploration is finished. Lawrence loses interest in schoolwork and withdraws socially. His father takes him to a holiday resort, where a gorgeous girl named Roselyn breaks through Lawrence's isolation, and the two develop a passionate relationship. Roselyn eventually informs Lawrence that there actually are space exploration missions through companies on Earth. Never having given up on his dream, he prepares to tell his father of his decision to leave school and overhears his father mentioning that Roselyn was paid to meet and seduce him. In a furious rage, he decides to leave Amethi immediately. He avoids detection by his father through the use of advanced quasi-sentient software, Prime, given to him by his friend Vinnie. Lawrence makes it to Earth and scores well on the Zantiu-Braun officer candidacy exams. However, lacking sufficient shares in the company, he is limited to a strategic security job instead of starship captain. As a Skin, he takes part on two missions of note, which are told over a series of short vignettes.

One was on the planet Thallspring, which is fairly Earth-like. He is stationed in the town Memu Bay, but he journeys through the hinterlands to the Arnoon province. He stops a trio of squaddies from a different platoon from gang-raping one of the villagers. Throughout his stay, Newton is bothered by something odd about the village, which seems to have a quality of living that is well beyond what one would expect given the surroundings. He is convinced they are hiding something, but he is unable to discover it.

The other was on the planet Santa Chico, where the founders modified themselves at a genetic level to coexist with the planet's biota. The mission goes disastrously wrong. As the colonists are no longer fully human, Zantiu-Braun's soldiers have trouble communicating with them, unable to fully comprehend their new lifestyle. The civilisation has little in the way of centralised industry or anything of value to Earth, and it remains extremely hostile to the Zantiu-Braun forces. The biological augmentations make them an equal match for the Skins (which the inhabitants had previously helped develop), inflicting severe casualties on the asset realization force. They eventually destroy a captured asteroid in orbit to create a Kessler syndrome that closes the sky, making further trips to the planet impossible. Newton concludes that the asset realization concept is no longer workable; the technology levels of the colony planets are growing so quickly that future missions will be too dangerous to be worthwhile. However, this also allows Newton to solve the mystery of Arnoon. Arnoon had, in plain sight, alien plants living on unsterilised soil bearing edible fruits. This would be impossible for Thallspring technology to create; Newton concludes it must have been provided by Santa Chico geneticists, paid for with some hidden wealth. Lawrence plans to "realize" their unknown wealth for himself and to use it to buy his retirement. When he learns of the next mission to Thallspring, he ensures his team is part of the contingent.

In the time since the first mission, Thallspring has advanced greatly. A small group has formed an effective resistance movement in preparation for the next asset realisation mission, led by Denise Ebourn from Arnoon. As a cover, Denise works in a kindergarten, where she tells the kids supposedly fictional stories about an ancient alien galaxy-wide civilisation and an alien prince named Mozark. Denise uses an advanced alien intelligence known as a "dragon" to enhance herself, her resistance-cellmates, and the villagers in Arnoon. When the Z-B mission arrives, her team uses their Prime software to sabotage the Z-B efforts with some effect. However, Newton, now a sergeant, also has Prime, and he uses it to return his platoon to Arnoon in search of its treasure. As Denise learns that Lawrence is headed for Arnoon village, she races to intercept him.

A violent confrontation takes place between Lawrence's platoon and a group of Arnoon villagers, ending with a wounded Lawrence staggering alone towards Arnoon village. When he arrives, he and his Skin suit are spent, and he is near death. The villagers, one of whom (Denise's sister) is the girl he previously saved from being raped, revives him. They reveal that their wealth comes from a damaged alien dragon with greatly advanced technological knowledge such as the nanotechnology used to enhance the resistance movement. The dragon is a spaceliving creature which is damaged and has lost much of its memory. To repay the dragon for its help, the villagers plan to steal one of Zantiu-Braun's starships to travel to the red sun where the dragon says its species lives.

After meeting the dragon and learning its story, Lawrence decides to join them, and he helps them to hijack a spaceship. They are pursued by a damaged Simon Roderick clone who is determined to use all means to capture the technology for himself, not even trusting his clone brothers. Another Simon Roderick clone follows, to acquire the technology and to stop his clone brother from becoming the only human to possess the powerful knowledge. Denise and Lawrence arrive at the red star and quickly find the dragons. They learn that the dragons are a disengaged race who do nothing but amass knowledge, sharing it freely with others. The Arnoon dragon was simply a seed, one out of billions, and no more important to them than a single sperm cell is to humans. Since they arrived first, Denise and Lawrence convince the red star dragon that the deranged Simon Roderick will misuse their knowledge, and the dragon disables his ship. The dragon civilisation gives their patternform construction knowledge to Lawrence, Denise and to the other Simon Roderick, in an agreement arranged by Denise and Lawrence so that the knowledge will be shared freely on Earth, not monopolised by Zantiu-Braun.

Lawrence uses the technology to construct the spaceship he has wanted since he was a teenager. He flies back in time through an ancient time portal, mentioned in Denise's kindergarten story, and then travels to Amethi. There he uses the technology to transform into Vinnie, one of young Lawrence's closest friends. After giving young Lawrence the Prime program so he can travel to Earth (closing the time loop), "Vinnie" changes into young Lawrence, and goes to make up with Roselyn.

=== Storytelling format ===
The book has multiple separate story threads. The threads are told in parallel in the book, merging at the end.

- Young Lawrence Newton's life on Amethi and becoming a Zantiu-Braun squaddie sergeant
- Adult Lawrence Newton's life as a Zantiu-Braun squaddie sergeant preparing for the asset realisation expedition to Thallspring
- Denise Ebourn from Arnoon village and her resistance group's preparation for and battle against the Thallspring asset realisation expedition
- The alien prince Mozark's journey in the galaxy-wide Ring Empire, a story told by Denise Ebourn to the kindergarten children
- Limited perspective and narrative view point from Simon Roderick, the board member leading the Thallspring campaign
