= Kayakalpa =

Indian rejuvenation practice

Kayakalpa is a form of traditional rejuvenation practice that originated in South India. It includes specific breathing, dietary, and exercise regiments. The practice is aimed at slowing down and reversing physical degeneration at the cellular level and improve the vitality of organ systems. Kayakalpa is a combination of two Sanskrit words with "kaya" meaning 'body' and "kalpa" meaning 'transformation'.
