= Void Trilogy =

2007–2010 science fiction trilogy by Peter F. Hamilton

The Void Trilogy is a space opera series by British author Peter F. Hamilton. The series is set in the same universe as The Commonwealth Saga, 1,200 years after the end of Judas Unchained.

Peter F. Hamilton sold the American rights to the series to Random House.

The series includes the following books:

- The Dreaming Void (2007)
- The Temporal Void (2008)
- The Evolutionary Void (2010)

== Synopsis ==
=== The Dreaming Void ===
The Dreaming Void
- First edition
- Author: Peter F. Hamilton
- Cover artist: Jim Burns
- Language: English
- Series: The Void Trilogy
- Genre: Science fiction
- Publisher: PanMacmillan
- Publication date: 8 March 2007
- Publication place: United Kingdom
- Media type: Print, E-book
- Pages: 672 (Paperback)
- ISBN: 978-1-4472-7968-6 (Paperback)
- OCLC: 85898119
- Preceded by: The Commonwealth Saga
- Followed by: The Temporal Void

What was formerly believed to be a supermassive black hole at the centre of the Milky Way is revealed to be an artificial construct, known as the Void. Inside, there is a strange universe where the laws of physics are very different from standard physics. It is slowly consuming the other stars of the galactic core—one day it will have devoured the entire galaxy.

In AD 3320, a human member of the Commonwealth, Inigo, begins to have dreams of the wonderful existence inside the Void. His dreams inspire the disaffected, who desire to travel into the Void, where their every wish will be fulfilled. By AD 3456, the pseudo-religious Living Dream movement exceeds 5 billion members, organizing the followers into a powerful political force. Other star-faring species fear their migration will cause the Void to expand again thus devouring the galaxy. They are prepared to stop the pilgrimage fleet no matter what the cost.

The Dreaming Void is broken into two distinct sections. The first follows Edeard, a young boy who lives inside the Void on a planet called Querencia, the subject of Inigo's dreams.

Edeard, an orphan and apprentice, lives in Ashwell, a town in Rulan province. A gifted psychic, he is trained by Master Akeem in crafting and modding. Initially a loner, he comes to prominence in his village after designing an alternative pump mechanism for the local well. Unfortunately his luck changes for the worse after Ashwell is raided by bandits. Forced to flee, he joins the local caravan and travels to Makkathran, the capital of Querencia. In Makkathran, Edeard joins the constables and after a brutal couple of months in training, he graduates and is promoted to the commander of his Squad. He makes little progress battling the rigid and backward judicial system of Makkathran; his first real break is when his squad overcomes a trap set by the local gang, and Edeard walks on water chasing the leader of the gang. A testament to his growing psychic abilities, Edeard's stunt earns him the title of Waterwalker, and he becomes an instant star in Makkathran.

The second section of The Dreaming Void is set back in the Commonwealth. Inigo, the first dreamer, and founder of Living Dream, has disappeared, leaving the 5 billion strong Living Dream movement in a state of flux. When Ethan, succeeding Inigo as the head of the movement, proclaims that the Living Dream will embark on a pilgrimage into the Void, the Commonwealth is thrown into a state of political chaos. Fearing that the human migration might cause the Void to expand (and in the process destroy whole systems or even the whole Galaxy) other spacefaring races such as the Raiel and Ocisen Empire are deeply concerned, with the latter threatening military action. This has left the Commonwealth government deeply divided, with the two largest factions in disagreement, the Accelerators faction/party supporting the pilgrimage and the Conservative faction opposing. As both parties are unable to solve the situation politically they have resolved to take matters into their own hands, with each party sending agents to further its interests.

Aaron, a sleeper cell agent, is tasked with finding Inigo. He kidnaps and manipulates Corrie-Lyn, a former lover of Inigo and interrogates her for information. He also travels to Kuhmo (Inigo's homeworld) to get further information and robs Inigo's secure storage (a bank for memory). He eventually tracks Inigo to Hanko, a desolate and barren world. However, before Aaron can extract Inigo, Accelerator agents destroy Aaron's starship leaving him marooned on Hanko. Meanwhile, Accelerator agents make a deal with Ethan, agreeing to give the Living Dream movement Ultra Drives to power their ships. Accelerator plans are halted when the Delivery Man, a Conservative party agent, destroys valuable FTL Drive tech. Troblum, an Accelerator physicist, also defects, further slowing the Accelerators plans.

=== The Temporal Void ===
The Temporal Void
- Hardcover edition cover
- Author: Peter F. Hamilton
- Cover artist: Jim Burns
- Language: English
- Series: The Void Trilogy
- Genre: Science fiction
- Publisher: PanMacmillan
- Publication date: 3 October 2008
- Publication place: United Kingdom
- Media type: Print, E-book
- Pages: 746 (Hardcover)
- ISBN: 1-4050-8884-2
- OCLC: 233788407
- Preceded by: The Dreaming Void
- Followed by: The Evolutionary Void

The Temporal Void picks up after The Dreaming Void.

The Intersolar Commonwealth faces mounting turmoil as the deadline for Living Dream's Pilgrimage into the Void approaches. An Ocisen Empire fleet advances on a mission of genocide, while an internecine war erupts among post-human factions over humanity's future.

Amidst the chaos, investigator Paula Myo struggles to counter the increasingly desperate actions of various agents and factions. Relentless in her pursuit, she contends with adversaries from her distant past and colleagues of uncertain loyalty, all while racing against time.

At the center of the unfolding crisis is Edeard the Waterwalker, a figure from the distant past who lived deep within the Void. As the messiah of Living Dream, his life—broadcast through visions—captivates and inspires billions. His story fuels the Pilgrimage's momentum, a force seemingly impossible to stop. As Edeard approaches his ultimate victory, the true nature of the Void is finally revealed.

=== The Evolutionary Void ===
The Evolutionary Void
- Cover artist Steve Stone, UK hardcover edition
- Author: Peter F. Hamilton
- Cover artist: Steve Stone
- Language: English
- Series: The Void Trilogy
- Genre: Science fiction
- Publisher: Pan Macmillan (UK), Del Rey (US)
- Publication date: 24 August 2010 (US), 10 September (UK)
- Publication place: United Kingdom
- English publication date: 24 August 2010
- Media type: Print – Hardcover, Tall Paper Back, Paper Back
- Pages: 726 (Tall Paper Back)
- ISBN: 978-1-4050-8895-4 (Tall Paper Back)
- Preceded by: The Temporal Void

The Evolutionary Void picks up after The Temporal Void.

Exposed as the Second Dreamer, Araminta has become the target of a galaxy-wide search by government agent Paula Myo and the psychopath known as the Cat, along with others equally determined to prevent, or facilitate, the pilgrimage of the Living Dream cult into the heart of the Void. An indestructible microuniverse, the Void may contain paradise, as the cultists believe, but it is also a deadly threat. For the miraculous reality that exists inside its boundaries demands energy, energy drawn from everything outside those boundaries: from planets, stars, galaxies, and everything that lives, for the Pilgrimage will trigger a super-massive expansion of the Void.

Meanwhile, the parallel story of Edeard, the Waterwalker, as told through a series of dreams communicated to the gaiafield via Inigo, the First Dreamer, continues to unfold. But the inspirational tale of this idealistic young man takes a darker and more troubling turn as he finds himself faced with powerful new enemies, and temptations more powerful still, to reach fulfilment in the end.

Named a Silfen Friend like her ancestress Mellanie, Araminta chooses to face her unwanted responsibilities, with no guarantee of success or survival. She takes on the role of Second Dreamer to lead the first wave of Living Dream, 24 million people, into the Void, leaving everyone confused and lost by her actions. However, in actuality, she is playing a double game. Using her original body to lead the Living Dream as a diversion, she borrows one of her fiancé's (Mr. Bovey) bodies to set out to destroy the Void. She is able to connect with a Skylord and travel the Silfen Paths.

With time running out, a repentant Inigo decides to release Edeard's final dream whose message is scarcely less dangerous than the pilgrimage promises to be, where perfection is achieved, so that nothing else is left to strive for and the human race in the Void has started to devolve. He goes to the Spike to meet Ozzie and stays there to meet with Araminta, who is using one of her fiancé's bodies, and Oscar.

Third Dreamer Gore Burnelli has a plan to reason with the Heart, the core of the Void. He secures the help of the Delivery Man and travels to the Anomine homeworld to retrieve the mechanism that allowed them to go post-physical. He is able to connect with Justine, his daughter, who is currently in the Void, by way of Dreams.

The monomaniacal Ilanthe, leader of the breakaway Accelerator Faction, seeks dominion in the Void. It is not Fusion with the Void to attain post-physical status that she wants, but to have control over everything. Using Dark Fortress technology, she sets up a barrier around the Sol system which leaves ANA and the deterrence fleet trapped inside. It is this technology which she has equipped the ships travelling to the Void with, the ability to create a forcefield which the Warrior Raiel cannot penetrate.

== Technology ==
The Commonwealth uses a number of advanced technologies. In the early days of the Commonwealth, humans used static and permanently opened wormholes to travel from planet to planet. However, after the events of the Starflyer War (detailed in the Commonwealth Saga), the CST corporation's monopoly on space travel was ended. With the advent of wormholes that could wrap around ships, the Commonwealth saw a shift from wormholes to spaceships.

Another development in the Commonwealth is the gaiafield. Developed by Ozzie Issac in AD 3000, the gaiafield is based on Silfen technology; when Ozzie was named a friend of the Silfen during the Starflyer war, he was given a pendant. In later years Ozzie broke open the pendant and discovered Quantum fields; replicating the quantum properties; he thus created the gaiafield. The gaiafield effectively allows individuals to feel the emotions of others. Ozzie developed the gaiafield with the hope that it would end conflict and division within the Commonwealth and encourage tolerance between sentient life in the Galaxy.

In AD 2833, the ANA was deployed—effectively a virtual universe that people could download their consciousness into. Individuals retained their memories, and thus their individuality, within the ANA. They also had their own virtual universe in which they could create and modify as they saw fit. The ANA eventually became the government of Earth and the Commonwealth, housing factions such as the Conservatives, the Accelerators, the Darwinists, the Moderates, and the Separatists. With over 50 million people by AD 3400. The ANA is a semi post physical entity—not a machine, the ANA consists of the molecular matter in the Quantum fields around earth.

Alternative lifestyles amidst the Commonwealth allow for endless combinations of technology Enrichments. The Advancer movement provides DNA modifications, of which 80% of the Humans in the Commonwealth have, either through choice or by birth. These 'Enrichments' provide in-vision iconography, communication, and passive environment scanning routines. Further uses of Biononics grant Enrichments for combat weaponry, shielding, physical enhancements and emotional and physiological dampening. The Higher movement, a social / economical / political ideology as well as a technology tree moving inexorably toward a 2nd life in ANA, used Biononics to keep their physical bodies in their healthy mid-20s until the time they 'Move Inward'; a personal journey to the outer worlds or to the ANA universe.

== Characters ==
- Inigo, the First Dreamer and founder of Living Dream
- Catherine Stewart (The Cat), Convict, former Navy Trooper, founder of Knights Guardian movement on Far Away, working for the Accelerator faction
- Paula Myo, Chief Investigator for the Commonwealth
- Gore Burnelli, Head of the Burnelli Grand Family and ANA:Governance and leader of the Conservative faction within ANA.
- Justine Burnelli, Earth socialite and a Commonwealth Senator and daughter of Gore
- Kazimir Burnelli, Grand Admiral of Commonwealth Navy and son of Justine
- Ilanthe, leader of the Accelerator Faction
- The High Angel, a sentient alien starship
- Edeard, the main subject of Inigo's dreams and known as the Waterwalker
- Marius, an agent of the Accelerator faction within ANA
- The Delivery Man, an agent of the Conservative faction
- "Aaron", an agent of the Conservative faction, searching for Inigo
- Araminta, a young divorcee on the planet Viotia
- Troblum, physicist and collector of artifacts from the "Starflyer War", initially working for Accelerator faction
- Oscar Monroe, former Navy officer and hero of the "Starflyer War", recruited to assist Paula Myo.
- Ozzie Isaacs, creator of the wormhole technology and gaiafield technology, among others.

== Characters from the Commonwealth Saga ==
The Dreaming Void makes both references and features characters from the Commonwealth Saga.

Paula Myo is now the chief of ANA security. In the Dreaming Void she is tasked with tracking Aaron and the Second Dreamer. After the events of the Starflyer War, Paula removed her rigid and unyielding hardwired genetic anomalies by Huxley Haven that made her obsessive and insensitive to criminals. In the years between the two books, Paula fought an appeal to keep Gene Yaohui (Oscar Monroe) in suspension. She also tracked down the deadly assassin and leader of the Knight Guardians, Cat "Catherine" Steward, resulting in Stewards 5000-year suspension. Late in life, Paula has taken a liking to music, listening to a vast diversity of music including Pink Floyd, Rachmaninoff and Deeley KTC. She also has a starship called the Alexis Denken, named after her lover from the Hive briefly mentioned in the Commonwealth Saga.

Cat "Catherine" Steward is another character making an appearance. She took control of the Guardians of Selfhood after the Starflyer war, changing and rebranding them as the Knights Guardian. They eventually took control of Far Away and claimed independence. Far Away became a model for new planets in the generations after the Starflyer war. Cat was caught by Paula Myo after brutally killing Tiger Pansy, who in the years following the Starflyer war resided on Far Away with the Raiel Quatux.

Gore Burnelli, helped create the ANA and is rumoured to be the leader of the Conservative faction; although he denies it, claiming he only has affiliations with the Conservatives. Justine, Gore's daughter, resides in the ANA. In the events of the Dreaming Void she leaves the ANA and acts as its physical ambassador.

After 1,100 years Oscar Monroe was relifed. With no friends and family left, he had to start fresh. He initially sought recruitment from the Navy, however they had no desire for his services. He ended up as a starship pilot living on the External World of Orakum and lives with three life partners; Jesaral, Anja and Dushiku. Paula Myo recruits Monroe in order to find the Second Dreamer.

Many other characters are referenced. Both Crispin Goldreich and Tonie Gall migrated into the ANA. After circumnavigating the galaxy Wilson and Anna Kime also joined the ANA. Mellanie is mentioned as having married Orion; and is an ancestor of Araminta. The Halgarths dynasty maintain Iaioud, an external world. Nigel Sheldon is briefly mentioned to have headed to another galaxy as the Void problem ultimately renders the Milky Way doomed. His descendant and former head of security Nelson Sheldon also joined the ANA.

== The Void ==
The Void was created by the Firstlife—the first beings to have existed in the galaxy—to reach the state of post-physical and fulfilment. It is where Makkathran is situated. The people in the Void have psychic abilities such as "farsight" and the "third hand". The Void requires a tremendous amount of energy to sustain itself and the abilities it offers, which it acquires by expanding, consuming planets and star systems and converting them into energy.

The Anomine is a race of alien beings who have reached post-physical status. They spread to many star systems in their prime. During this age, they discovered the Prime aliens and the threat they pose. They borrowed two DFspheres from the Raiel to generate the barriers around Dyson Alpha and Beta, the two star systems the Prime aliens inhabit, and confine them there (see the Commonwealth Saga). At the events of the Void trilogy, most of the Anomine already went post-physical, while some still live on their homeworld, living a life without the use of technology.

The human race has spread to many star systems which are named the Greater Commonwealth. There are Inner Worlds, where most of the citizens are "Higher humans"—humans who utilise Biononics. Biononics enable the human body to essentially live forever as they rejuvenate the human body on a constant basis. Almost every human has a memory cell insert which records every piece of information stored in the owner's brain. In the event of "bodyloss", this data can be downloaded into a clone of the original human, effectively eliminating death. Using so called secure stores, this data can even be stored in a second facility. If the memory cell is lost re-life is still possible, although without an uninterrupted continuity (a "restore" from a memory cell usually enables a clone to know how he died). ANA:Governance forms the government of Earth. ANA (Advanced Neural Activity Network) is a super computer/sentient intelligence/edifice embodied on and around Earth. Humans are able to download their consciousness into ANA, where they gain vastly expanded mentalities. Farther away from Earth are the External Worlds, which are somewhat less technologically advanced. The Living Dream Faction live like how the world is in Makkathran (inside the Void). Their clothing follows Makkathran style and fashion. The goal of Living Dream is to travel to and live in the Void. The Development of the gaiafield, the so-called uniform neural entanglement effect, by Ozzie, allowed Inigo to broadcast his Dreams to everyone connected to the gaiafield. By connecting to Edeard, he is able to see aspects of Edeard's life as it is in Makkathran and gifts them to everyone. According to Ozzie, the gaiafield was meant to be used only for people to express their emotions for others to see; its use has been perverted by Inigo.
