= Ricardo Pinto (novelist) =

Computer game programmer and fantasy novelist

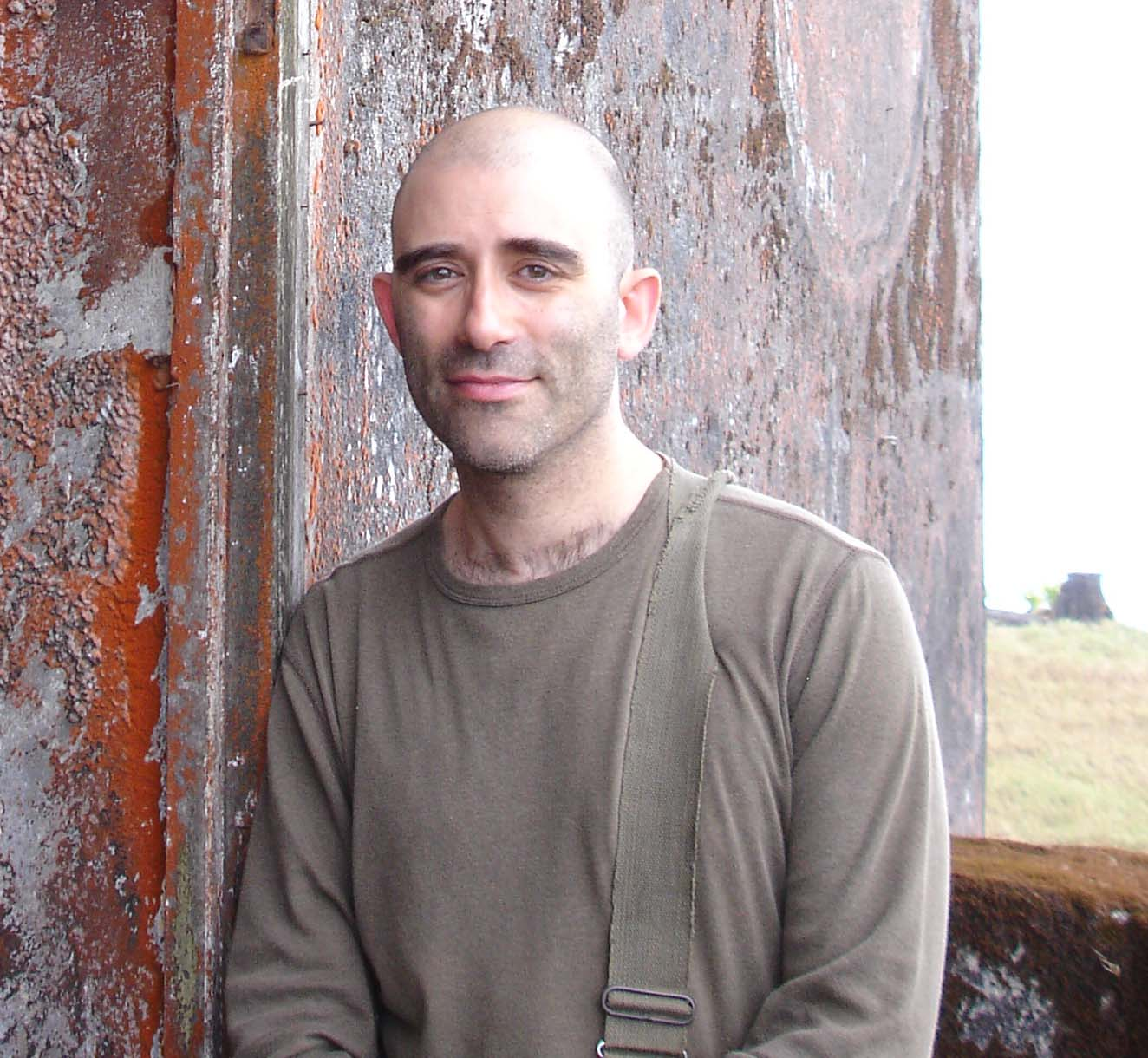
- Born: 1961 (age 64–65); Lisbon, Portugal
- Occupation: Novelist
- Writing career
- Genre: Fantasy
- Website: www.ricardopinto.com

Ricardo Pinto (born 1961 in Lisbon, Portugal) is a computer game programmer and fantasy novelist.

== Early life and gaming career ==
Pinto's family moved to London when he was six, and then to Dundee in Scotland. In 1979, he commenced a degree in mathematics at the University of Dundee. In 1983, Pinto moved to London to work as a programmer writing computer games. He moved back to Edinburgh and then to Bristol working on game design. He became interested in creating the plot for games and wrote Kryomek and Hivestone as support material for tabletop wargames.

== Writing ==
While still at university around 1982, Pinto had written a 600-page manuscript which he later said "contained a first, vague impression" of what would become his The Stone Dance of the Chameleon series. After 10 years working the computer gaming industry he spent two years unemployed and teaching himself to write, during which time he developed his Stone Dance concept further.

His first novel, The Chosen, was published in 1999. The sequel The Standing Dead was published in 2002 and a third novel, The Third God, appeared in 2009, its completion delayed by the effects of a fire at the author's home. The Stone Dance of the Chameleon trilogy concerns the harrowing experiences of the young and inexperienced heir to a ruling dynasty who is suddenly taken from his protected childhood and thrust into a cruel society where he must fight for his family honour, his position and his life.

After giving up designing computer games, Pinto said that he "carried that discipline's world-building paradigm" into his writing. Though interested in historical fiction, he chose to write in an invented universe so as not to be creatively constrained by the setting. He notes that the Masters of the Stone Dance series have aspects of the Roman emperors seen though a "fairy tale lens." An initial conceptual idea was that the story was set in late Cretaceous period Antarctica, and some elements remain from this scenario.

Pinto has said that the books include his most deeply held political beliefs. He also felt that, despite possible commercial difficulties, his novels should include gay characters as a reflection of his own life experiences. He acknowledged that his ideas on writing and creating fantasy worlds had been influenced by the works of J. R. R. Tolkien and the Dune novels of Frank Herbert.

== The Stone Dance of the Chameleon ==
Pinto's The Stone Dance of the Chameleon trilogy follows young nobleman Carnelian as he is thrust into the dangerous political arena of the Three Lands. In this slave-owning civilisation of dazzling beauty and ancient ritual, the purity of noble bloodlines is paramount to the strict and ruthless caste system headed by the God Emperor and his Chosen. The faces of these self-indulgent Masters, held as deities, can never be seen unmasked by lesser people, under threat of immediate death. As the series begins, Carnelian follows his father Sardian, Lord Suth, from their outlying home to the capital of Osrakum as the current Emperor lies dying and a successor is to be named. Carnelian's own lineage puts him at the center of court intrigue, and in mortal danger.

In 2020, Pinto re-released and self-published the series in a re-edited form, consisting of seven "leaner and extensive reworkings" of the original trilogy.

=== First Edition ===
1. The Chosen (1999)
2. The Standing Dead (2002)
3. The Third God (2009)

=== Second Edition ===
1. The Masters (2020)
2. The Chosen (2020)
3. The Standing Dead (2020)
4. The Darkness Under the Trees (2020)
5. Dragon Fire (2020)
6. The Mirror Breaks (2020)
7. The Third God (2020)

== Other works ==
- War in Heaven (2013, with Adrian Smith)
- Matryoshka (2018)
