= The Chronicle of the Fallers =

Space opera sequence by Peter F. Hamilton

The Abyss Beyond Dreams
- First edition (UK)
- Author: Peter F. Hamilton
- Illustrator: Chester Orwell
- Language: English
- Series: The Chronicle of the Fallers
- Genre: Science fiction novel
- Publisher: Pan Macmillan (UK); Del Rey Books (US)
- Publication date: 9 October 2014 (UK)
- Publication place: United Kingdom
- Media type: Print (hardcover); Audiobook
- Pages: 640
- ISBN: 978-0345547194
- OCLC: 886382210
- Followed by: A Night Without Stars

A Night Without Stars
- First edition (UK)
- Author: Peter F. Hamilton
- Cover artist: Larry Rostant
- Language: English
- Series: The Chronicle of the Fallers
- Genre: Science fiction novel
- Publisher: Pan Macmillan (UK); Del Rey Books (US)
- Publication date: 22 September 2016 (UK); 27 September 2016 (US)
- Publication place: United Kingdom
- Media type: Print (hardcover); Audiobook
- Pages: 720
- ISBN: 978-0230769496
- Preceded by: The Abyss Beyond Dreams

The Chronicle of the Fallers is a space opera sequence by science fiction author Peter F. Hamilton. Hamilton announced in 2011 that he was developing a new trilogy set in Commonwealth Universe. He later decided to cut the trilogy down to two parts. Cover art for The Abyss Beyond Dreams was unveiled on March 19, 2014. The book was published by Pan Macmillan in October 2014. The sequel, A Night Without Stars, arrived in September 2016.

== Synopsis ==
From the publisher:

The planet Bienvenido is in crisis. It has finally escaped the Void, emerging into regular space. But it’s millions of light-years from Commonwealth assistance, and humans are battling the Fallers for control of their world. This rapacious adversary, evolved to destroy all sentient life, has infiltrated every level of human society – hijacking unwilling bodies so its citizens fear their leaders, friends and family. A mysterious figure known as the Warrior Angel leads a desperate resistance. She’s helped by forbidden Commonwealth technology, which gives her a crucial edge. But the government obstructs the Angel’s efforts at every turn, blinded by prejudice and technophobia. As Fallers also prepare to attack from the skies, she might need to incite rebellion to fight this invasion. But the odds seem impossible. Then astronaut Ry Evine uncovers one last hope. On a mission against the enemy, his spacecraft damages an unidentified vessel. This crash-lands on the planet carrying unexpected cargo: a baby. This extraordinary Commonwealth child possesses knowledge that could save them all. But if the Fallers catch her, the people of Bienvenido will not survive.

== Setting ==
The Void, created at the centre of the Milky Way galaxy by an ancient alien race, has a different quantum structure from that of a normal space. The Void reacts to conscious thought, but prevents the use of most electric and electronic devices, although most newly arrived equipment functions initially and only degrades over a period of time. Technology on Bienvenido is generally limited to a 19th-century or early 20th-century level, including steam engines, municipal water supplies and an extensive railway transportation network, but no long-distance communication such as radio or telegraphy. On the other hand, all humans and other sapient beings in the Void possess telekinesis and mental telepathy capabilities, and retain their knowledge of more advanced technology. Biotechnology also largely resists the Void's effects, allowing Nigel Sheldon to bring a team of powerful androids into the Void with him.

Bienvenido has returned to normal space outside the void. Thought no longer projects power or communication in the physical world and electric and electronic devices function normally. Fearful of losing power, the ruling totalitarian Government wields its ruthless secret police to restrict and control technology to that of 1960s Earth. The author cited a trip to a former Stasi museum in Leipzig, Germany as the inspiration for the post-revolutionary society. Furthermore in the realm where they are found is a solar system containing other planets which the void had banished. Such as a gas Giant Containing the Rael war fleet.
