= The Web of the Chozen =

1978 science fiction novel by Jack L. Chalker

First edition (publ. Del Rey Books) Cover artist: Ralph McQuarrie

The Web of the Chozen is a novel by Jack L. Chalker published in 1978.

== Plot summary ==
The Web of the Chozen is a novel about Bar Holliday on a lost colony, as his body has been altered by a mutant virus into a quadruped.

== Reception ==
Howard Thompson reviewed The Web of the Chozen in The Space Gamer No. 15. Thompson commented that "The redeeming feature of The Web of the Chozen is that some of the ideas are interesting and, in selected spots, are handled with moderate style. It would be far more interesting if the characters could be seen side ways, and did more than walk through their lines."

== Reviews ==
- Review by Andrew Kaveney (1979) in Foundation, #15 January 1979
- Kliatt
