= A Second Chance at Eden =

Short story collection by Peter F. Hamilton

- First edition
- Author: Peter F. Hamilton
- Cover artist: Jim Burns
- Language: English
- Series: Night's Dawn
- Genre: Science fiction
- Published: 2008 by Pan Macmillan (UK)
- Publication place: United Kingdom
- Media type: Print (hardcover & paperback); Ebook
- Pages: 431
- ISBN: 9780333741252
- OCLC: 40623987
- Dewey Decimal: 823.914
- LC Class: PR6058.A5536

A Second Chance at Eden (1998) is a collection of short stories by British writer Peter F. Hamilton, set in the Night's Dawn universe.

The stories in this collection form a series of snapshot glimpses into the history of the Confederation leading up to the time of The Night's Dawn Trilogy. During the early 1990s Hamilton wrote several short stories centered on the affinity technology - and they became the inspiration to write Night's Dawn.

== Contents ==
=== "Sonnie's Edge" ===
"Sonnie's Edge" was first published in New Moon magazine in September 1991. It's set on Earth in the year 2070 and is about the fictional sport of beastie-baiting, involving contests to the death between artificial monsters controlled via human affinity bonds. The story was adapted as an episode of Love, Death & Robots in 2019.

=== "A Second Chance at Eden" ===
"A Second Chance at Eden" is a detective story set in the year 2090. It tells about the events leading to the formation of the society that was to become the Edenists. Eden is a bitek habitat which orbits Jupiter, mining the fusion fuel on which Earth is dependent - a mini-nation of radical politics and even more radical technology. Then, one of its co-creators, Penny Maowkavitz, is murdered by one of the affinity-bonded servitor chimps, but nobody can identify the perpetrator - or the motive.

=== "New Days Old Times" ===
"New Days Old Times" is set in the year 2245. Settlers came to the planet Nyvan hoping for a lifestyle free of Earthbound hatred. Alas, though environments may change, human nature does not.

=== "Candy Buds" ===
"Candy Buds" was first published in New Worlds #2 (1992). In the year 2393, the crime lord Laurus rules Kariwak on Tropicana with an iron fist, jealously guarding control of the bitek trade. But when an astonishing new substance appears on the streets, virtual reality takes on an entirely new dimension.

=== "Deathday" ===
"Deathday" was first published in Fear Magazine in February 1991. On the desolate planet Jubarra, a man wages an obsessive campaign of retribution against the last survivor of an alien race. But vengeance can cut both ways.

=== "The Lives and Loves of Tiarella Rosa" ===
"The Lives and Loves of Tiarella Rosa" first appeared in a different form as "Spare Capacity" in New Worlds #3 (1993). Set in 2447 on Tropicana, this story is about passion, destiny and cloning.

=== "Escape Route" ===
"Escape Route" was first published in Interzone magazine in July 1997. It is a story about Joshua Calvert's father, Marcus Calvert, set in the year 2586. In his starship Lady Macbeth, he encounters a long-abandoned alien spacecraft with its escape route intact.

== Critical reception ==
SFSite praises its finely crafted characters and intricate plots, calling it a delightful supplement to the Night's Dawn trilogy.

== Adaptations ==
"Sonnie's Edge" was adapted as the first episode of the Netflix anthology Love, Death & Robots.
