= The Night's Dawn Trilogy =

SF novel series by Peter F. Hamilton

The Reality Dysfunction
- Author: Peter F. Hamilton
- Language: English
- Series: The Night's Dawn Trilogy
- Genre: Science fiction
- Pages: 955
- ISBN: 0-333-63427-6
- OCLC: 59651803
- Followed by: The Neutronium Alchemist

The Neutronium Alchemist
- Author: Peter F. Hamilton
- Language: English
- Series: The Night's Dawn Trilogy
- Genre: Science fiction
- Pages: 999
- ISBN: 0-333-66935-5
- OCLC: 60136648
- Preceded by: The Reality Dysfunction
- Followed by: The Naked God

The Naked God
- Author: Peter F. Hamilton
- Language: English
- Series: The Night's Dawn Trilogy
- Genre: Science fiction
- Pages: 1,174
- ISBN: 0-333-68791-4
- OCLC: 43070064
- Preceded by: The Neutronium Alchemist

British author Peter F. Hamilton's The Night's Dawn Trilogy consists of three science fiction novels: The Reality Dysfunction (1996), The Neutronium Alchemist (1997), and The Naked God (1999). A collection of short stories, A Second Chance at Eden, shares the same universe, and The Confederation Handbook documents that universe in non-fiction style.

== Overview ==
The story of The Night's Dawn Trilogy is separated over three books: The Reality Dysfunction (1996), The Neutronium Alchemist (1997), and The Naked God (1999); but is also supported by "A Second Chance at Eden", a collection of short stories which provide insight into the history of Hamilton's universe.

The story is divided in many threads, based on primary, secondary and tertiary characters. These delve deeply into the rich and complex texture of the Universe providing a sense of verisimilitude, also exploring some of Hamilton's darker themes. These story lines include Dariat's struggles inside Valisk, and the Deadnights' voyage to their 'Saviour'.

In the 27th century humans have colonised nearly 900 worlds, have living, sentient starships as well as the conventional kind, and are also living in asteroid communities and in large, living space stations. Due to policies of 'ethnic streaming' by the colonisation authorities, worlds are generally united under a single government, with these governments collectively forming a Confederation. The Confederation includes both Adamists and Edenists, two alien races (the Tyrathca and the Kiint), and has an armed Navy (which acts primarily against smugglers, pirates and anti-matter production facilities, which are highly illegal) and a central 'house' based on the world of Avon. Earth is still an important world, with a massive population, exporting a massive number of colonists (both voluntarily and involuntarily), but virtually environmentally destroyed after years of technological abuse.

== Humanity in the 27th century ==
In the Night's Dawn trilogy, humankind, although now united under an organization known as the Confederation, has been broken up into two major divisions, Adamists and Edenists. The economy is dominated by the Edenists, who maintain a powerful monopoly across the Confederation by harvesting ^{3}He ("helium 3") from suitable gas giants. This resource is used by all Adamist starships as a primary fuel source. The use of the only other major energy source, antimatter, is illegal due to its devastating military potential, and its possession or production is a capital crime.

=== Adamist culture ===
Adamists are the larger of the two groups, and consider themselves to be normal humans. They allow themselves to use some genetic-engineering improvements (referred to as "geneering"), but do not generally condone the use of "bitek" (organic/bio technology) in their culture. They are a vast group of people of various cultures and backgrounds, and realistically, the Adamist group encompasses any non-Edenist humans. The majority of Adamists, who are at least nominally religious, do not utilise bitek because it was banned by the Pope during the 21st century. Instead, they use nanotechnology, which they refer to as "nanonics". Nanonics perform many of the same physiological feats as bitek, and the two technologies are relatively compatible. Adamist starships use fusion drives, and much of the human economy therefore depends on ^{3}He. The ZTT (Zero Tau Transit, i.e. faster than light) drive allows Adamists to colonize star-systems, usually settling both planets and asteroid belts.

=== Edenist culture ===
Edenists are, for the most part, a single culture. They are an idealized, egalitarian, utopian society which, while not believing or practicing religion, does not prohibit it. The majority of Edenists live in huge, multi-kilometre space habitats orbiting gas giants. Each individual habitat is a living organism, fully sentient, and is the perfect arbitrator of its community. Habitats cannot be bribed, are perfect impartial judges, and are aware of almost everything that occurs within them and immediately around them. The most important aspect of any Edenist is his/her use of affinity. Affinity is an advanced form of mental communication similar to the present-day concepts of telepathy or entanglement. Edenist affinity allows them to transfer their memories into the habitat at the time of death. This is regarded as a form of immortality. However, no habitat has yet died of old age (nor will for millennia) and could in turn pass their memories and personality on to another habitat were they ever to die. Adamist religions reject this as an attempt to avoid God's judgment on the soul after death, and it is this which is the root cause of the schism between the Adamist and Edenist cultures.

Edenists have access to faster-than-light travel through large, fully sentient bitek creatures called "Voidhawks". They, along with their crews, make up a vast armada of Edenist merchant vessels operating throughout the Confederation as well as a large fraction of the Confederation Navy. Voidhawks are born and live in the vacuum of space. They are naturally attuned to the magnetic fields and energy fluctuations of surrounding space, and can generate and precisely control a distortion field to manipulate space around them. By manipulating space in this way, Voidhawks can open wormholes and jump long distances (many light years) instantaneously. Such jumps are known as "swallows". Another product of the distortion field is the ability to affect gravity in and near the Voidhawk. This is used to reduce the effect of high-g manoeuvering on Voidhawk crews. By using the full power of their distortion fields, Voidhawks can attain a speed and manoeuvrability unmatched by Adamist vessels (except those powered by illegal and highly dangerous antimatter).

Edenists heavily genetically modify their children, including the gene which allows affinity to develop from conception. They also use modified "servitors" which are often chimpanzees with affinity which carry out small tasks and leave Edenists to concentrate on more important matters. Edenists operate cloud scoops in gas giants in order to extract the rare isotope helium 3 which can be used for fusion energy.

== Characters ==
- Samual Aleksandrovich: The commanding officer of the Confederation Navy, Admiral Aleksandrovich is in command of the military response to the possession crisis. A realist, he understands that military force is fundamentally unable to deal with such a problem, as a decisive military defeat of the Possessed would be tantamount to annihilating a large portion of the human race. He is reluctant to agree to support the attempt to reclaim Ombey from the possessed for this reason, but agrees to the mission because he recognises the political necessity of securing a victory against the possessed for the purposes of public morale.
- Joshua Calvert: Captain of the starship Lady Macbeth, Joshua Calvert is one of the main protagonists of the story. Like his late father Marcus, he is an amoral lothario with a pathological need to sleep with and then abandon vulnerable young girls, who are attracted to him due to his status. He has an incredible and inexplicable intuition. Captain Calvert, along with Captain Syrinx and others is one of those directly responsible for ending the possession crisis.
- Liol Calvert: Estranged older half-brother to Joshua Calvert, Liol seeks to take Joshua's ship, the Lady MacBeth, which he believes is rightfully his. He eventually comes to understand that Joshua is the better captain after flying with him on the mission to the Sleeping God.
- Al Capone: One of several well-known historical figures to return from the Beyond, Al Capone constructed an organisation which quickly gained control of New California. He attempted to spread to several other planets, with varying degrees of success. Capone's Organisation was most notable because he tried to force both the possessed and non-possessed to continue to work together. His tactics in expanding his sphere of control were noted by the whole of the confederation. His use of Kiera's Hellhawks allowed the continued security of his stronghold for the majority of his power.
- Kiera Salter: Marie Skibbow's possessor, and the leader of the Deadnight cult as well as the Hellhawks used by Capone.
- Dariat: A descendant of Rubra, Dariat despises his ancestor for trying to manipulate him through affinity in order to turn him into the perfect heir. When the possessed arrive on the Valisk habitat, Dariat commits suicide in order to join their ranks. Eventually he becomes disenchanted with the possessed, and gradually joins forces with Rubra to work against them.
- Quinn Dexter: One of the major antagonists and primary villains, Quinn Dexter is a man wholly lacking in redeeming qualities. A dedicated Satanist, he takes great pleasure in inflicting physical and emotional pain on others, and considers torture, rape, murder and brainwashing to be perfectly acceptable hobbies. He is the first person to become possessed by a soul from the Beyond.
- André Duchamp: A French trader, Captain of the "Villeneuve's Revenge". Duchamp is an amoral character who will perform more or less any task for the right price. His less savoury actions included piracy, trading in antimatter technology, and working for Capone's Organisation to defend New California. He nearly dies in an antimatter explosion near Trafalgar asteroid set off by Kingsley Pryor, a non-Possessed coerced working for Capone. He is later sent off to a penal planet.
- Ashly Hanson: A member of Joshua Calvert's crew, Ashly is the pilot of the Lady MacBeth's shuttlecraft. Although he was 67 years old at the time of the first book, he was actually born prior to 2229. Born to reasonable wealth he had signed his trust fund over to a bank in return for the long-term use of a zero-tau stasis pod. Ashly subsequently alternated fifty years in stasis and five years travelling the Confederation.
- Ralph Hiltch: The head of station for the ESA on Lalonde. Ralph battled the return of the possessed almost from the very beginning of the first outbreak. After evacuating Lalonde he travelled to Ombey and fought the infiltration there. He was unsuccessful in preventing the possessed from gaining a foothold on the planet, but became grimly determined to defeat them. To that end he convinced both the Kulu Kingdom and the Edenists to join forces in building a massive army to take on the possessed on Ombey. As a direct result he was promoted from Lieutenant to General and appointed commander of the liberation effort.
- Louise Kavanagh: A naive young girl, the daughter of Grant Kavanagh, Louise grew up in the Cricklade Estate on Norfolk, largely ignorant of the rest of the Confederation. She slept with Joshua Calvert when he stayed at the estate, and became both pregnant by him and infatuated with him. When the possessed took over Norfolk she managed to escape and make her way to Earth along with her sister Genevieve and Fletcher Christian, one of the possessed. Louise eventually reunited with Joshua, and he abandoned his previous life to live with her.
- Genevieve Kavanagh: The younger daughter of the Kavanagh estate. She is seen by almost everyone she meets to be extremely irritating, obnoxious and vindictive. She escaped from Norfolk, her home planet, during its possession, with her sister.
- Laton: An Edenist serpent, Laton was one of the greatest criminals known to his culture. Self-confident to the point of arrogance, he was a leading expert in biotechnology. He sought to develop a process whereby he could use affinity to spread his consciousness throughout multiple bodies and so become effectively immortal. When he was discovered Laton covered his escape by releasing a lethal virus into his habitat's brain, which, coupled with a simultaneous antimatter attack, destroyed the habitat and killed hundreds of thousands of Edenists. Laton went into hiding on Lalonde, where he remained until discovered by Quinn Dexter. He attempted to frame Dexter and his group for the murder of a child, leading ultimately to Quinn's possession. Laton was himself possessed, but managed to gain the upper hand over his possessor. He subsequently committed suicide to halt the spread of the possessed on Atlantis, an Edenist planet.
- Dr. Alkad Mzu: A resident of the planet Garissa, Mzu developed a super-weapon known as the Alchemist which was capable of making a star go nova or turning it into a black hole of the sun's original mass. Whilst attempting to deploy the weapon during a war with the planet Omuta, Mzu's ship was disabled by an Omutan attack. The surface of her planet was subsequently wrecked by 15 high-yield antimatter planet-buster bombs which killed the entire population. Mzu ended up in the Tranquillity habitat; she agreed to remain there under observation by various intelligence agencies so that the secret of the Alchemist would not become generally available. During the course of the trilogy Mzu escapes Tranquillity and attempts to retrieve the weapon so that it can be used on Omuta; instead she helps Joshua Calvert use the device to ignite a gas giant so as to facilitate their escape from ships under the control of the possessed.
- Rubra: An Edenist serpent, Rubra germinated the Valisk habitat. He retro-engineered the Voidhawk genome and manipulated it to create the first Blackhawks. Using Valisk as a Blackhawk base for trade and transportation, as well as smuggling and mercenary activities, made Rubra extremely rich. After death Rubra transferred his memories and personality into Valisk's neural strata, as was common for Edenists, although he became the controlling personality for the entire habitat. He used affinity to try to manipulate his descendants into near identical copies of himself so that they would be worthy heirs. Each attempt was a failure in Rubra's eyes, and he became exceedingly bitter as his financial empire disintegrated. Although Rubra wasn't a sympathetic and nice personality, he did help the people of Valisk through their possession.
- Ione Saldana: known as "The Lord of Ruin", Ione is the granddaughter of Michael Saldana, once the Crown Prince of the Saldana Royal Family and creator of the Tranquillity habitat. The Saldanas had been staunch defenders of the Adamist culture for centuries, and Michael's betrayal caused a considerable scandal which led to the exile of himself and all of his descendants. Ione is the absolute ruler of Tranquillity, with complete dictatorial power over every aspect of life. She kept her presence on the habitat secret for some years, concerned that her youth and seeming inexperience would cause a crisis of confidence amongst the economic community if she revealed herself. Joshua Calvert is one of Ione's lovers and the father of her children.
- Gerald Skibbow: A colonist on Lalonde, Gerald was one of the first people in the Confederation to be possessed. He was captured and placed into zero tau for return to civilisation; the time in the pod forced the possessing soul to leave his body. Gerald was left deeply traumatized by his possession, and became obsessed with finding his possessed daughter Marie. He spends much of the trilogy trying to find her.
- Marie Skibbow: An extremely beautiful 18-year-old woman with red hair and green eyes, Marie was deeply unhappy when her family moved to Lalonde to become colonists there. When she turned 18 she abandoned her settlement and went to work in Durringham, the capital city of the planet, to try to raise money to leave for good. She dealt with Joshua Calvert when he visited Lalonde, and was possessed shortly afterwards by the soul of Kiera Salter. Kiera left Lalonde on the Yaku. She managed to take over Rubra's habitat Valisk and allied with Al Capone's organisation, but was banished from Marie's body by Joshua's actions.
- Syrinx: An Edenist, daughter of Athene, and captain of the Voidhawk Oenone, Syrinx served a two-year term in the military, where she conspicuously failed to catch Joshua Calvert smuggling contraband, before becoming a commercial trader. She runs into Calvert on several more occasions throughout the books. Syrinx travels to the Tyrathca home system to investigate their knowledge of the possession phenomena, and undertakes various other missions for the Confederation.
- Wing-Tsit Chong: A biotechnologist and the Founder of Edenism. He invented the affinity gene, a form of communication similar to telepathy which also enables the ability to share emotions, sensual experience and even see through someone else's eyes. The affinity gene was invented in 2058. If this gene is incorporated into the DNA, it becomes dominant, therefore even the offspring of an Adamist-Edenist relationship are true Edenists. An Adamist can gain the ability of affinity by having neuron symbionts implanted. In 2090 the first habitat, Eden, was opened for settlement. Years later Wing-Tsit Chong died and transferred his memories into the neural strata of the habitat using affinity. Pope Eleanor, seeing this as an attempt to avoid divine judgment, excommunicated all humans who possess affinity. This led to the creation of the Edenist culture. Although most of the transferred memories merge with the habitat personality over time, Wing-Tsit Chong still remains a single and self-aware entity within the neural strata of Eden.
