= Peter F. Hamilton =

British author (born 1960)

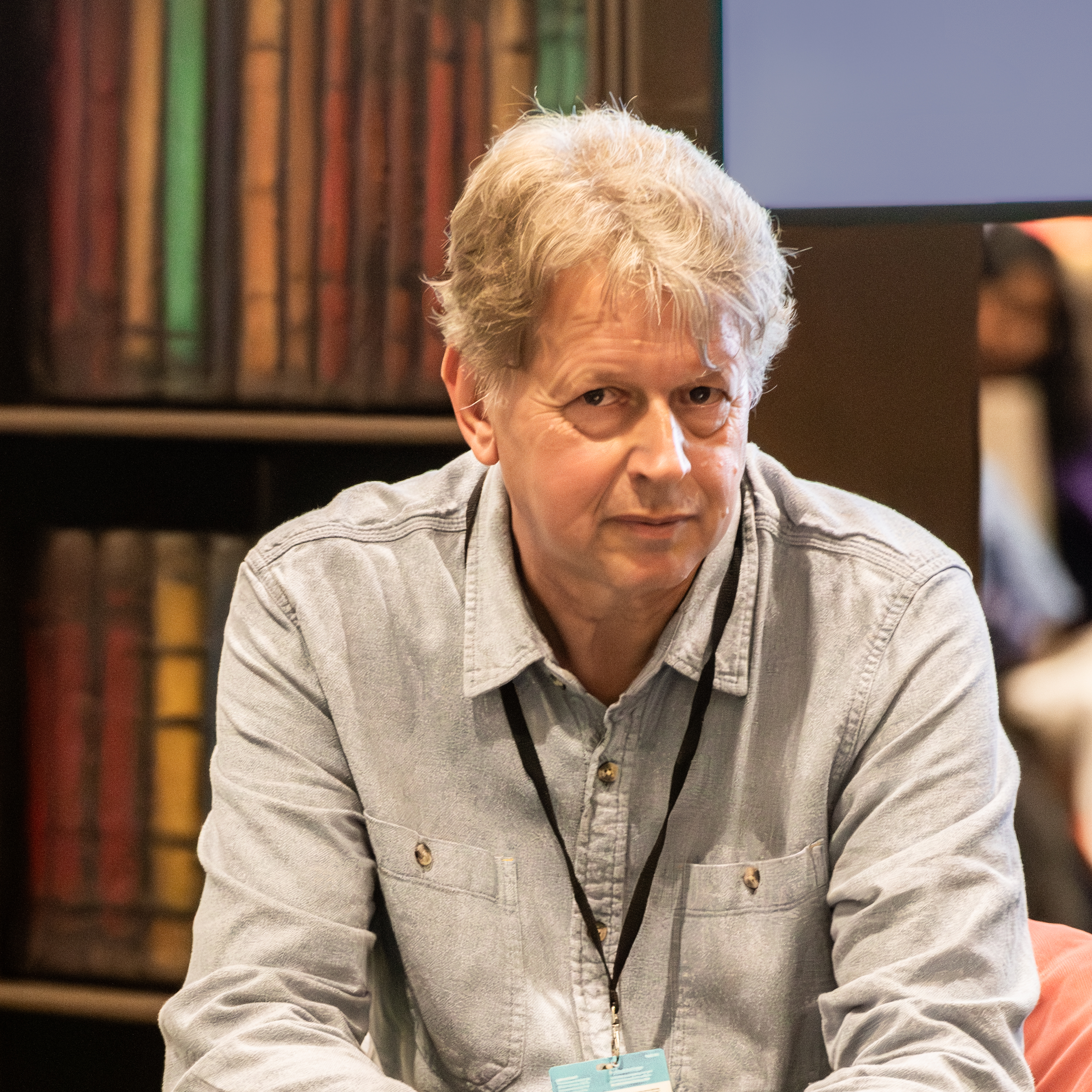
- At MCM Comic Con London, May 2025
- Born: 1960 (age 65–66); Rutland, England
- Occupation: Novelist
- Writing career
- Period: 1987–present
- Genres: Science fiction, Space opera
- Website: www.panmacmillan.com/authors/peter-f-hamilton/1507

Peter F. Hamilton (born 1960) is a British author. He is known for writing science fiction space opera.

== Biography ==
Peter F. Hamilton was born in Rutland, England in 1960. He did not attend university. He said in an interview, "I did science at school up to age eighteen, I stopped doing English, English literature, writing at sixteen, I just wasn't interested in those days".

After he started writing in 1987, he sold his first short story to Fear Magazine in 1988. His first novel, Mindstar Rising, was published during 1993, followed by A Quantum Murder (1994) and The Nano Flower (1995), which together comprise the Greg Mandel trilogy.

He then wrote a space opera novel, named The Night's Dawn Trilogy. He has also published the Commonwealth Saga with the Void Trilogy and The Chronicle of the Fallers in the same universe.

Since 2018, he has written the unrelated space opera Salvation Sequence, and young adult sci-fi Arkship Trilogy, set in original universes.

== Awards ==
In 2000, Hamilton was awarded BSFA Award for The Suspect Genome.

Hamilton received the Inkpot Award in 2012.
