= List of fictional humanoid species in video games =

This is a list of fictional humanoid species originating in video games, and is subsidiary to lists of humanoids. It is a collection of various notable humanoid species that are featured in video games, including arcade games, personal computer games, or console games.

Species	Game	Notes
Amani	TERA	A draconic race known for their constant war and extreme strength. They were once slaves, serving as conquerors for their masters. They set themselves free and learned to temper their lust for war and desire peace instead. Today, they are an honorable and noble race.
Argonians	The Elder Scrolls	Lizard people that live in a large swamp called the Black Marsh. Are capable of breathing in water and have developed immunity to certain diseases.
Asari	Mass Effect	A monogendered, feminine race capable of reproducing with members of any other species.
Baraka	TERA	The Baraka are descendants of Giants known for their extreme strength and size. They are also a race of intellectuals who have scholarly pursuits and libraries set across the world.
Batarians	Mass Effect	A four-eyed race notorious for their being pirates, slavers, and smugglers. Conflicts with humans colonizing their region of the Milky Way have resulted in negative Batarian-Human relations.
Beastlings	Threefold Recital	A race of anthropomorphic animals living amongst humans and dragons.
Broken	Warcraft	A devolved sub-race of the Draenei, who live in Outland, mutated after being exposed to the fel energies wielded by orc warlocks.
Byrdles	Atlyss	
Cabal	Destiny	A militaristic species of turtle-like aliens that spans an entire empire.
Caninus	Fuga: Melodies of Steel	A race of anthropomorphic dogs.
Changs	Atlyss	
Darkspawn	Dragon Age	
Devil Jin	Tekken	
Dirtmoles	RimWorld	A gray-skinned and gray-eyed race that are naturally gifted at mining, but are shortsighted and have an intense sensitivity to sunlight.
Draconian	Dragonlance	The Draconians were created by the forces of The Dark Queen, corrupted from the eggs of the good dragons that were stolen as they slept. There are 5 distinct races of Draconians, one for each color of the stolen eggs. Each race has its own powers and abilities, derived from those of their parent species.
Draenei	Warcraft	A blue skinned humanoid race with hooves and horns, who arrived to Azeroth via their spaceships. They joined the cause of the Alliance in their new homeworld.
Drell	Mass Effect	A reptilian race from an arid homeworld.
Drow	Dungeons & Dragons	A dark-skinned humanoid fey race that live beneath the earth.
Duergar	Dungeons & Dragons	Evil, gray-skinned subterranean dwarves who are outcast and shunned by all races who live above them.
Dwarves	Dungeons & Dragons	Short, humanoid people
Eliksni	Destiny	Also known as "Fallen", The Eliksni are a four-armed race of nomads that were reduced from their former glory.
Elves	Dungeons & Dragons	A race of long-lived, ever youthful race of humanoids with various subraces. They are often admired by other races for their grace and skillful grasp of magic.
Flind	Dungeons & Dragons	Related to a gnoll.
Endermen	Minecraft	Endermen are tall, black neutral mobs from the End that have the ability to teleport and pick up blocks.
Felinekos	Fuga: Melodies of Steel	A race of anthropomorphic cats.
Formie	Spark the Electric Jester	An interplanetary alien race.
Genies	RimWorld	Engineered to be great researchers and craftsmen, at the cost of being delicate and socially awkward. They are always bald and never grow facial hair, and sport elongated fingers that aid in manipulation.
Gerudo	The Legend of Zelda	A race of desert dwelling woman warriors. One male Gerudo is born every 100 years.
Gnoll	Dungeons & Dragons	Bloodthirsty humanoid hyenas that devoutly worship a demon lord.
Gnomes	Dungeons & Dragons	Gnomes are generally human in look, albeit roughly a foot shorter. They tend to have prominent noses. Gnomes tend towards tinkering and mining.
Goblins	Dungeons & Dragons	Goblins are short, generally green to brown skinned humanoids. They are fairly weak, servile to stronger evil races, but dangerous in packs.
Goron	The Legend of Zelda	Rock-eating giants found in mountainous regions. Gorons are able to tolerate extreme heat and are experts at stone and metal crafting.
Geth	Mass Effect	A race of processing-power-sharing AI programs created by the quarians that utilise humanoid "mobile platforms" for labour and combat.
Guado	Final Fantasy X	The Guado are a race on Spira that are generally taller than humans, with elongated fingers ending in clawed nails. The Guado have elaborate hair, in various shades of blue, and extensively tattoo their skin. They are the race who guard the "Far Realm", where the spirits of those who have died move on to, so they don't remain in Spira to become fiends.
Halflings	Dungeons & Dragons	Halflings are the D&D answer to "Hobbits", as that term was trademarked by the Tolkien estate. Share most, if not all, of the typical characteristics of the Tolkien race (above ground, earthen living; love of food and drink; barefoot; prosaic existence).
Hive	Destiny	An ancient race, led by Oryx (and his son Crota), that took the Moon from humans in The Collapse.
Hobgoblins	Dungeons & Dragons	Hobgoblins are a larger, stronger race of goblins. More vicious, hobgoblins tend to be commanders of large forces of both goblins and orcs, whom they can bully.
Highmates	RimWorld	Stunningly attractive and kind humans engineered to be perfect soulmates, at the cost of being mentally incapable of causing harm.
Hylian	The Legend of Zelda	Pointy eared elf-like humans, said to be messengers of the gods.
Hussars	RimWorld	Bulky, red-eyed humans engineered to be powerful soldier but otherwise incompetent in most other skill areas.
Impids	RimWorld	A fast-running, demonic race with a fire spew ability that can thrive in hot desert climates, but are unhappy, immunodeficient and inept in close-quarter combat.
Inkling	Splatoon	A species of squid that have the ability to shape-shift into a humanoid form.
Kenku	Dungeons & Dragons	Bird-like, flightless, humanoid creatures.
Kerbals	Kerbal Space Program	A race of comically inept but enthusiastic little green men apparently entirely devoted to advancing their space program.
Khajiit	The Elder Scrolls	A species that resemble the feline family. Excel in skills such as thieving and sneaking
Kobolds	Dungeons & Dragons	Aggressive, xenophobic, yet industrious small humanoid creatures, kobolds are noted for their skill at building traps and preparing ambushes.
Kokiri	The Legend of Zelda	Childlike forest sprites born of the Great Deku Tree. Each Kokiri is gifted a guardian fairy that acts as a friend and teacher for them throughout life.
Korok	The Legend of Zelda	Little wooden forest sprites that wear leaves as masks. Originally Kokiri that gave up their human appearance in order to gain the ability to fly.
Krogan	Mass Effect	A belligerent dinosaur-like race from a fiercely competitive native ecology.
Kuo-toa	Dungeons & Dragons	Fish-like monstrous humanoids that dwell in the Underdark, and in the sea.
Leonin	Magic: The Gathering	The Leonin are anthropomorphic feline humanoids who are fierce warriors and devout priest. Generally associated with white mana.
Lombaxes	Ratchet & Clank series	
Loxodon	Magic: The Gathering	The Loxodon are anthropomorphic elephantine humanoids who are thinkers and naturalists. Generally associated with blue and green mana.
Moogles	Final Fantasy series	
Nezumi	Magic: The Gathering	A race of ratfolk from the plane of Kamigawa. They are swamp dwelling tribes made up primarily shaman and ninjas. Nezumi are generally associated with black magics.
Night Elves	Warcraft	An ancient forest dweller elvish race who have the ability to meld to the shadows. They mostly live in Kalimdor, and are part of the Alliance.
Nimbats	Dust: An Elysian Tail	
Nopon	Xenoblade	A race of fuzzy egg-shaped creatures with peculiar speech patterns and two large "wings" that function as arms.
Octolings	Splatoon	Similarly to Inklings, Octolings are a species of octopus that have the ability to shape-shift into a humanoid form.
Orcs	Dungeons & Dragons	Orcs are evil humanoids, roughly analogous to humans in the D&D universe by size and stature. They are usually depicted as porcine in their appearance.
Orochi-bito	Magic: The Gathering	
Piglins	Minecraft	Piglins are neutral mobs found in the Nether. They attack players on sight unless the player is equipped with at least one piece of golden armor. Players can use gold ingots to barter with them for various items via throwing the ingots to the ground near the piglins.
Pigskins	RimWorld	Pig-human hybrids engineered with the intent of being used for organ harvesting that unintentionally became more sapient than intended. They are able to eat raw food with no negative side effects, are resistant to illness, but are unskilled in cooking and have difficulty with manipulation due to their trotter hands.
Poons	Atlyss	
Popori	TERA	Popori are magical animal-kin that exist in harmony with nature and are guardians of their woodland realm.
Protheans	Mass Effect	An extinct predecessor race who are thought to have created many of the technological relics on which the modern galaxy's society is based.
Protoss	StarCraft	The Protoss are depicted as a physically strong sapient extraterrestrial species with access to advanced psionic abilities.
Quarians	Mass Effect	A nomadic species who wear environmental suits to compensate for a weakened immune system.
Qunari	Dragon Age	Giant, metallic skinned, and horned people whose name comes from their religious text, the Qun.
Rito	The Legend of Zelda	A race of bird-like humans distantly related to the Zoras. In order to fly, Rito must obtain and consume a scale from a sky dragon as a rite of passage.
Ronso	Final Fantasy X	A species of blue furred, lion-like humanoids.
Rayman's species	Rayman	A species of limbless humanoids.
Salarian	Mass Effect	A short-lived, quick-witted amphibian species.
Selkies	Final Fantasy Crystal Chronicles	
Sheikah	The Legend of Zelda	A race/tribe of red eyed sneaky assassins who are known as the 'Shadow People'.
Shokan	Mortal Kombat	The Shokan are a species of half-human, half-dragon warriors that live in the kingdom of Kuatan in Outworld.
Skaven	Warhammer Fantasy	Skaven are a chaotic race of plague-spreading ratfolk, that live in massive hordes in warrens beneath the surface world.
Soratami	Magic: The Gathering	
Tarkatans	Mortal Kombat	Long, somewhat demonic features mark the Tarkatan race. Baraka and Mileena are Tarkatans
Tauren	Warcraft	Huge nomadic creatures who are bovine in appearance and live on the grassy, open plains of Mulgore in central Kalimdor. They joined the Orcs and the Trolls to form the Horde.
Thirens	Zenless Zone Zero	A race of humanoids with animal features, such as Von Lycaon (wolf tail) and Ellen Joe (shark tail).
Thri-kreen	Dungeons & Dragons	Mantis warriors. One of the primary player character races of the Dark Sun campaign setting.
Toad	Super Mario Bros.	Mushroom humanoid who helps Mario and his friends on various adventures. Also serves as a playable character in Mario spin-offs such as tennis, kart racing, and board games.
Toadette	Mario Kart: Double Dash	The only female Toad in the Mushroom Kingdom, where she also helps Mario on his adventures.
Troglodytes	Dungeons & Dragons	Troglodytes are subterranean lizard men who exude a powerful stench that can incapacitate their enemies.
Twili	The Legend of Zelda	A race of dark elves descended from humans that were banished to the Twilight Realm.
Turian	Mass Effect	An avian race covered in a distinctive metallic carapace.
Vedalken	Magic: The Gathering	The Vedalken are a blue-skinned, mostly humanoid race dedicated to knowledge and the arcane. Generally associated with white and blue mana.
Vex	Destiny	An ancient race of semi-organic machines linked by Vex Minds
Viashino	Magic: The Gathering	The Viashino are a tribe of vicious, war-like lizard men. Generally associated with red mana.
Volus	Mass Effect	A rotund, diminutive race adapted to a high-pressure greenhouse atmosphere and ammonia-based biochemistry, thus forcing them to wear special environment suits to survive in human-compatible conditions.
Vorcha	Mass Effect	A short-lived, violent species capable of unparalleled adaptive abilities.
Wasters	RimWorld	Unattractive humans with dark gray skin, gray hair and gaunt faces. They are aggressive, unskilled in several areas and have a genetic drug dependency, whilst on the other hand, they have powerful immune systems, are immune to toxic environments and thrive in polluted areas.
Vortigaunt	Half-Life	A brown bipedial species with the ability to channel lightning, first living in Xen, then Earth.
Yttakin	RimWorld	Robust humans covered in fur from head to toe, which protects them from the harsh cold environments of the planets their ancestors were engineered to thrive on. They share a psychic connection with the local fauna, but possess little mining skill and move rather slow when not nude.
Yukes	Final Fantasy Crystal Chronicles	
Zora	The Legend of Zelda	Amphibious merpeople, capable of living in or out of water. Lovers of art and beauty many Zora take up profession as entertainers and artists.
