= Lists of humanoids =

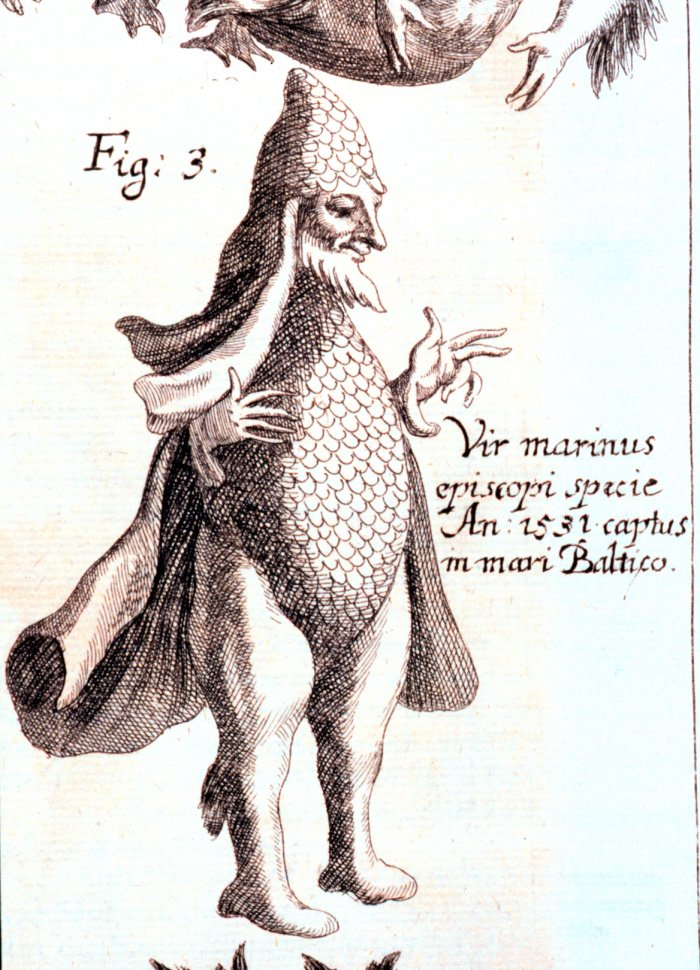
The bishop-fish, from Poland in the 16th century

Lists of humanoids cover humanoids, imaginary species similar to humans. They are organized by type (avian, piscine and amphibian, reptilian, and extraterrestrial), and by medium (literature, comics, animation, television, film and video games).

== By type ==
- List of humanoid aliens
- List of avian humanoids
- List of piscine and amphibian humanoids
- List of reptilian humanoids
- Little people (mythology)

== By medium ==
- List of fictional humanoid species in literature
- List of fictional humanoid species in comics
- List of fictional humanoid species in television
- List of fictional humanoid species in film
- List of fictional humanoid species in video games
