= Double Eleven (company) =

British video game developer and publisher

Double Eleven Limited
- Type: Subsidiary
- Industry: Video games
- Founded: 23 December 2009; 16 years ago in Durham, England
- Founders: Lee Hutchinson; Matt Shepcar
- Headquarters: Middlesbrough, England
- Key people: Mark South (co-CEOs); Kimberley Turner (co-CEOs)
- Owner: Pneuma Group Limited (2022–present)
- Number of employees: 400+ (2024)
- Parent: Pneuma Games Group Limited
- Website: double11.com

Double Eleven Limited (also known as Double Eleven Studios) is a British video game developer and publisher based in Middlesbrough, North Yorkshire, England.

== History ==
Double Eleven was founded by Lee Hutchinson and Matt Shepcar on 23 December 2009. Both had previously worked as lead programmers for Rockstar Leeds, where Hutchinson had been involved with the iOS versions of Grand Theft Auto: Chinatown Wars and Beaterator, while Shepcar had contributed to multiple Grand Theft Auto games. According to Hutchinson, their decision to leave Rockstar Leeds was amicable and driven by the desire to work on smaller projects, principally indie games for iOS. The name "Double Eleven" was derived from Hutchinson's lucky number. By February 2010, Hutchinson had assumed the role of studio director, whereas Shepcar would join him a few weeks later. Hutchinson initially ran Double Eleven from his loft in his hometown, Durham, and occasionally received support from his younger sister, Kimberley Turner, outside of her day job. In late 2010, Double Eleven relocated to the Boho One office building in Middlesbrough and Turner joined the company full-time as finance director.

In 2010, Double Eleven began working on an undisclosed title with Sony Computer Entertainment Europe, revealed at E3 2011 to be LittleBigPlanet for PlayStation Vita. In 2011, they joined the trade association TIGA. Between 2011 and 2012, Double Eleven were contracted to work exclusively with Sony Computer Entertainment Europe. During this time, they opened an additional studio in Leeds, West Yorkshire.

In 2013, they announced that they are working on a remake of Frozen Synapse - originally by Mode 7 Games - for the PlayStation Vita and PlayStation 3, entitled Frozen Synapse: Tactics. After finishing PixelJunk Shooter Ultimate for PS4 and Vita in June 2014, development for Frozen Synapse: Tactics quickly took off and by 5 September 2014 it took on a new name of Frozen Synapse Prime along with a release date of 24 September 2014 for the PlayStation Vita. Two months later it was released on the PlayStation 3 and Windows.

In August 2014, at Gamescom 2014, it was announced that they were working on the next PixelJunk game, Nom Nom Galaxy for the PlayStation 4 and PlayStation Vita and Goat Simulator for Xbox One and Xbox 360. Goat Simulator was released in April 2015.

In 2017, Double Eleven announced they were releasing two new titles, Super Cloudbuilt by Coilworks (PlayStation 4, Windows, and Xbox One) and Songbringer by Wizard Fu Games (PlayStation 4, Xbox One and Windows 10), which released between July and September. Double Eleven received recognition from GamesIndustry.biz, named one of the 'Best Places To Work 2017'. The company was also featured in The Sunday Times Tech Track 100, placing at number 42 out of 100 with a sales rise of 92.32% over three years.

In 2019, Double Eleven announced their acquisition of VooFoo Studios. Based in Birmingham, UK, and developer of Hustle Kings, the purchase on 1 December 2018 included multiple intellectual properties, including the announced This Is Pool and This is Snooker with Stephen Hendry (coming to Nintendo Switch, PlayStation 4, Xbox One and Steam) and their proprietary Mantis Engine, which was used in 2016's Mantis Burn Racing. On 20 June 2019, it was announced that Double Eleven had partnered with Paradox Interactive to become the new lead developer of Prison Architect, previously Introversion Software, for Linux, macOS, Nintendo Switch, PlayStation 4, Windows, and Xbox One. Double Eleven have previous experience with the game and initially ported and updated the title for all major consoles. Double Eleven subsequently announced their involvement in Mojang's Minecraft Dungeons and that they will be publishing Facepunch Studios' Rust on Xbox One and PlayStation 4.

Double Eleven announced in January 2020 that they will be opening a second office in Kuala Lumpur, Malaysia as to gain an in-roads into the Asian marketplace.

On 28 March 2022, Double Eleven announced their collaboration with Bethesda Game Studios to develop content for Fallout 76 later in the year.

In April 2022, Double Eleven hired its 300th employee. On 18 November 2022, Double Eleven was acquired by Pneuma Group, an investment firm owned by Hutchinson.

On 7 August 2023, Double Eleven was announced as the lead developer on the PlayStation 4 and Nintendo Switch ports of the original Red Dead Redemption in collaboration with publisher Rockstar Games. It was released in August 2023, with the Windows version released on 29 October 2024.

On 16 January 2024, Double Eleven was announced as the lead developer for Prison Architect 2 in collaboration with publisher Paradox Interactive.

On 21 March 2024, Double Eleven announced to office relocation from Boho One to Boho X.

On 25 Oct 2025, Double Eleven announced the step-down of Lee Hutchison as CEO and appointed Mark South and Kimberly Tuner as co-CEOs.

== Games ==
Game title	Release date	Platform(s)	Notes
LittleBigPlanet	2012	PlayStation Vita	
Limbo	2013	PlayStation Vita	
PixelJunk Monsters Ultimate	2013	PlayStation Vita, Windows, Linux, OS X	
PixelJunk Shooter	2013	Windows, OS X, Linux	
PixelJunk Shooter Ultimate	2014	PlayStation 4, PlayStation Vita	
Frozen Synapse Prime	2014	Windows, PlayStation Vita, PlayStation 3	
Limbo	2014	Xbox One, PlayStation 4	
Nom Nom Galaxy	2015	PlayStation 4	
Goat Simulator	2015	Xbox One, Xbox 360, PlayStation 4, PlayStation 3	
Goat Simulator: MMOre GoatZ Edition	2015	Xbox One, Xbox 360	
Frozen Synapse Prime	2015	Android, iOS	
PixelJunk Shooter Ultimate	2015	Windows	
PixelJunk Monsters	2016	Wii U	
Prison Architect	2016	PlayStation 4, Xbox 360, Xbox One	
Lego Harry Potter: Years 1-4	2016	PlayStation 4	
Lego Harry Potter: Years 5-7	2016	PlayStation 4	
Super Cloudbuilt	2017	PlayStation 4, Windows, Xbox One	
Songbringer	2017	PlayStation 4, Xbox One	
Songbringer	2018	Nintendo Switch, UWP	
Prison Architect	2018	Nintendo Switch	
Lego Harry Potter: Years 1–4	2018	Nintendo Switch, Xbox One	
Lego Harry Potter: Years 5–7	2018	Nintendo Switch, Xbox One	
Doctor Who Infinity	2018	Android, iOS	
Crackdown 3	2019	Windows	
Prison Architect	2019	Android, iOS, Linux, macOS, Nintendo Switch, PlayStation 4, Windows, Xbox 360, Xbox One	Took over development from Introversion Software
Minecraft Dungeons	2020	Nintendo Switch, PlayStation 4, Xbox One, Windows	Developed with Mojang
Songbringer	2020	iOS	
Rust	2021	PlayStation 4, Xbox One	Developed with Facepunch Studios
Rust	2025	PlayStation 5, Xbox Series X/S	Developed with Facepunch Studios
RimWorld	2022	PlayStation 4, Xbox One	Developed with Ludeon Studios
Red Dead Redemption	2023	PlayStation 4, Nintendo Switch	Original game by Rockstar San Diego
Red Dead Redemption	2024	Windows	Original game by Rockstar San Diego
Red Dead Redemption	2025	PlayStation 5, Xbox Series X/S, Nintendo Switch 2, Android, iOS	Original game by Rockstar San Diego
Grounded	2024	Nintendo Switch, PlayStation 4, PlayStation 5	Original game by Obsidian Entertainment
Minecraft Dungeons II	2026	Nintendo Switch, Nintendo Switch 2 PlayStation 5, Windows, Xbox Series X/S	
Blindfire	2026	Windows, PlayStation 5, Xbox Series X/S	
Prison Architect 2	TBA	Windows, MacOS, Linux, PlayStation 5, Xbox Series X/S	
