= DEFCON (video game) =

2006 video game

- Developer: Introversion Software
- Publishers: NA: Encore Software; EU: Pinnacle Entertainment Group
- Designers: Chris Delay; Gary Chambers
- Composers: Alistair Lindsay; Michael Maidment
- Platforms: Windows; Mac OS X Linux
- Release: Windows: WW: 29 September 2006 (Steam); NA: 26 March 2007; EU: 15 June 2007; OS X 19 April 2007; Linux; 11 December 2012
- Genre: Real-time strategy
- Modes: Zero-player, singleplayer and multiplayer

DEFCON (stylised as DEFCOИ and sometimes subtitled Everybody Dies in the North American version and Global Thermonuclear War in the European version) is a real-time strategy game created by independent British game developer Introversion Software. The gameplay is a simulation of a global nuclear war, with the game's screen reminiscent of the "big boards" that visually represented thermonuclear war in films such as Dr. Strangelove, Fail-Safe, and especially WarGames.

The game became available for download on September 29, 2006 through Introversion's web store and Steam. On 5 April 2007, publisher Encore announced they would be publishing the game in the United States, and had ordered an initial 50,000 copies of the game for retail. In the UK it was released for retail on 15 June 2007 and for a limited period included the developer's first game Uplink.

== Gameplay ==
Players are given a 1980s vector graphics computer-themed world map, a varied arsenal of nuclear and conventional weaponry, and a primary objective: destroy as much of the enemy's population as possible while having as little of one's own population destroyed as possible. A typical game will see civilian casualties numbering in the millions (megadeaths) while players try their hand at annihilating their opponents.

In most games, all sides take heavy losses, but the player with the highest score wins. Players' scores are determined according to one of three schemes: Default (gain 2 points for 1 megadeath caused, lose 1 point for 1 megadeath suffered), Survivor (gain 1 point per million survivors in the player's territory) or Genocide (gain 1 point for each megadeath caused); though functionally identical in a one-on-one conflict, each scoring scheme suggests large differences in strategy in larger multiplayer conflicts.

Gameplay time can be varied by configuring the speed at which events progress from real-time (1 second in-game:1 second out-of-game) to 20 times real-time. Most games last 30 to 40 minutes while real-time gameplay can last more than eight hours, depending on the mode of scoring. There is also an "Office" mode of play in which the game is permanently real-timed and can be minimised to run in the background of other computer activities, allowing the player to check in only when important events take place, and only for so long as it is necessary to modify the standing orders of each of the player's assets. The game offers six territories that may be selected by a player or assigned to an AI opponent.

DEFCON is a streamlined real-time strategy game, with no unit production (except for automatic fighter regeneration), resource collection, or technology tree upgrades. Players choose and position their forces at the beginning of the game. A countdown system prevents games from disintegrating prematurely. Gameplay begins at alert level DEFCON 5 and counts down to DEFCON 1 (the highest alert level). Each upgrade in alert level brings more possibilities.

Once DEFCON 1 is reached, the game proceeds until a certain percentage (80% by default) of the total number of nuclear missiles available to all players have been launched or destroyed. Once this occurs, a victory countdown begins (45 game minutes by default) and the final score is announced when this countdown runs out.

A DEFCON game can host up to six human or AI players. DEFCON also features local multiplayer capability, i.e. on LAN, however the metaserver is used to find games anyway. Alliances can be formed, broken, or renegotiated at will with human players. Alliances with CPU-controlled players can only be set at the start of the game. Allied players share radar coverage and line of sight, but there is no allied victory and there is only one winner. This means that almost all alliances are broken by the end of the game. Lead designer Chris Delay explains:

We've seen alliance members shooting overhead friendly planes down because they believed the planes were scouting the area for targets in preparation for a strike. This results in arguments in the chat channels, followed by skirmishes at sea, followed by retaliation, before finally the whole alliance collapses and everyone starts nuking the hell out of each other. It's awesome.

The chat system features a public channel, in which all players may communicate, as well as channels private to specific alliances, and direct player-to-player private messaging.

=== Diplomacy mode ===
All players start as members of a single alliance, and attempt to stay on top as the alliance disintegrates. The score is determined not by the enemy population killed, but by which territory has the highest percentage of survivors at the end of the game.

=== Office mode ===
In office mode, the game runs in real-time and cannot be sped up. The game can be quickly forced to the background making the computer available for other use. While the game continues to run in the background, a system tray icon will notify the gamer of certain events as they occur. The office mode hotkey, sometimes referred to as the boss key, is activated by striking the escape key twice in rapid succession. A game in office mode lasts no more than six hours. The boss key is available in all game modes, but it is designed for this mode in particular.

=== Modifications ===
Users can modify texture, sound, localization, etc. files that are found in the game's program files. The source code is available for purchase, but its distributed version is modified to be incompatible with official binaries. The purchase link used to be available on Introversion's official store, however the website has been redesigned in September 2016 and the link now can only be found in archived copy. A mod forum is available on the official forums, and a user-made list (open domain) was listed on the official website before it was redesigned.

== Reception ==
Reception

Aggregate score
Aggregator	Score
Metacritic	84/100

Review scores
Publication	Score
1Up.com	A
Edge	7/10
Eurogamer	8/10
GamePro	4.5/5
GamesMaster	80%
GameSpot	8.1/10
IGN	(Alex) 8.8/10 (Steve) 8.5/10
PALGN	8/10
PC Gamer (US)	83%
VideoGamer.com	9/10
The A.V. Club	B+
The New York Times	(positive)

Awards
Publication	Award
PC Gamer	Top 100 PC Games July 2008 (# 59)
Way of The Rodent	Best Involuntary Yelp
Way of The Rodent	Best Sound

DEFCON received "favourable" reviews according to the review aggregation website Metacritic.

1UP.com said, "This just may be the finest piece of 'budgetware' ever produced, with every bit as much to offer strategywise as RTS games three times its cost," praising the "elementary" interface and calling the strategic depth "enormous." 1UP also praised the visuals, calling it "one of the best-looking PC games all year." Edge said DEFCON was "worth it for the presentation alone." Eurogamer commented that it was "the least ambitious of Introversion's games in terms of design," and "its limitations are ones of the game's basic scope," while praising DEFCON "as pure and direct a game as its inspiration."

The editors of Computer Games Magazine presented DEFCON with their 2006 "Best Budget Game" award. It was a runner-up for their list of the year's top 10 computer games. It also won PC Gamer US's 2006 "Best Indie Game" award.

A study by the Concordia University asked participants about nuclear war, including how likely they thought one could happen or if they could survive one, and divided them into two groups: one that played DEFCON and the other that read articles about nuclear weapons. After asking the questions again, the study concluded that those who played DEFCON were less likely to believe that they would survive a nuclear war, but also less likely to believe one could happen.

== See also ==
- WarGames (video game)
- Balance of Power (video game)
- NUKEMAP
