= Subversion (video game) =

- Developer: Introversion Software
- Release: Suspended
- Genre: Real-time strategy

Subversion was a planned game from Introversion Software. It makes heavy use of procedurally generated content. A generator capable of building a model city, complete with buildings, roads and highways was demonstrated at an Imperial College Games and Media event. Development of the software is being documented in the Introversion Software blog. In May 2008, lead developer Chris Delay discussed the game in an interview with Eurogamer.

According to Chris Delay, he had always wanted to know what game developers went through when they developed games, so he made the approach with Subversion. In Subversion, the player takes on the role of a criminal mastermind orchestrating a theft from a secured building:

Subversion is going to be set in a modern High Tech environment, with you taking "mission control" over a team of skilled operatives in a hostile High Security building. You will be using Sabotage, Social Engineering and Grifting, custom Electrical and Mechanical devices, Distractions, Hacking, Stealth, Acrobatics, Precision demolitions, Trickery, whatever gets the job done. In the best case scenarios your enemies will never know you were even there. When things go wrong, a well prepared escape plan and well timed precision violence will get you out of a tight spot - or maybe not.

On October 17, 2011 Introversion posted on their blog that the game has been put on hold as they had lost the focus of the gameplay which made them decide to focus their efforts on developing a new game. Subversion however is not canceled, and they'll return to it once they'll "rethink [it] from top to bottom". Since then, it has been known through the Prison Architect art book that the game has since been canceled.

== BAFTA demonstration ==
Chris Delay gave a live demonstration of an early build of Subversion at the Darwinia+ launch event at BAFTA on February 19, 2010 and was later announced on the Subversion blog on February 21, 2010.

At the BAFTA event, Chris Delay controlled one of a number of agents, each represented as a green "lily pad" placeholder. The agents left behind a trail of footsteps as they moved. The agent was directed around a wireframe building. Delay noted the resemblance to Pac-Man. Only parts of the building were revealed initially, such as parts visible through windows.

The agent was directed around the building, revealing detailed features, including toilets. The building was populated with other people, each represented as a red lily pad. The door locks and other obstacles were also shown in red. Delay said that red means bad, similar to Darwinia.

The agent was shown using a machine gun to blow the lock off a door. The machine gun fire was represented as a red wireframe cone.

The other people in the game were shown to exit the building in response to danger. Buildings were also populated by security guards who tracked down and electrocuted the first agent.

There is also a currently unfinished hacking element that Chris Delay demonstrated by taking control of all the cameras in the building. This revealed the layout of the entire building. A second agent blew up a server room to complete the mission.

Delay described the development as now taking place from the "bottom-up" rather than the "top-down" approach used to generate the procedurally-generated cities.

== Development diary ==
Developer Chris Delay regularly describes the process of developing the game. In the August 2010 blog post, he talked about his new 'sprinting' development methodology, and explained how the sound would work in the new game. The blog frequently features videos, but until recently nothing on the gameplay has been revealed, only technology.

== Suspension ==
On October 17, 2011, Chris Delay posted on the development diary that the project would be stopped and that they were currently working on a new project, entitled Prison Architect. The reason given for this was because the game had lost most of its "core" and that the developers were relying on a lot of scripting to make the game even playable. "The game was more fun to create than it will ever be for someone playing it". Thus the project is currently not being developed further, and though it might be completed, Chris says, that will only be in the future.
