= Scanner Sombre =

2017 video game

- Developer: Introversion Software
- Publisher: Introversion Software
- Directors: Chris Delay; Thomas Arundel
- Producer: Mark Morris
- Designer: Dean Tate
- Programmers: John Knottenbelt; Leander Hambley; Gary Chambers; Andrew Lim; Finlay Curran
- Artist: John Godwin
- Composer: Alistair Lindsay
- Engine: Unity
- Platforms: macOS, Windows
- Release: 26 April 2017
- Genre: Exploration
- Mode: Single-player

Scanner Sombre is a cave exploration video game developed and published by Introversion Software. It was released for macOS and Windows PC on 26 April 2017. The game received mixed reviews upon release.

== Gameplay and plot ==
Scanner Sombre is an exploration video game played from a first-person perspective. The player awakens in a tent inside a pitch black cave; after finding an augmented reality headset and a LIDAR scanner, the player can illuminate the surrounding environment using dots. As the protagonist traverses the cave, they note that no one has gone this deep into the mine before; they find evidence of a cultist monastery who performed sacrifices as well as witch-hunts, as well as various remnants of mining expeditions, a lot of which ended in tragedy. When approaching such scenes, the protagonist's vision occasionally glitches out, which the protagonist attributes to hardware failure, but also notes that there have been rumors about the cave containing ghosts. Occasionally the player can find upgrades to the scanner that unlock various features, such as more dense scanning or a map. The caverns also occasionally hazardous, with ledges the player can fall off of, as well as apparitions that can attack.

As the game progresses, the protagonist begins to remember the past and it is eventually revealed that the trek is not headed deeper into the mine, but out of it. It is revealed that the protagonist ventured so deep into the mine that they eventually died there, and they are now reliving their dying memories while their family mourns them on the surface. Once the protagonist encounters their family, they are slowly transported back down through the caves they explored all the way to the starting tent, and the dots illuminating the mine slowly disappear. The player regains control and can go pick up the scanner again, but this time the protagonist is shocked to see that their arms are made entirely of glowing dots.

Restarting the game in "New Game+" mode and using the "material scanner" mode not available on the scanner in a first-time play, the player can find their dead body that was otherwise blending into the terrain in "distance scanner" mode.

== Development and release ==
Scanner Sombre was developed by Introversion Software. A prototype of the game was showcased at EGX Rezzed in early 2016. The prototype was developed in one month during 2015 by several members at the studio while they were working on content updates for their previous game Prison Architect. The game was released for macOS and Windows on 26 April 2017. The game took nine months to develop. Introversion markets the game as being inspired by Gone Home and Dear Esther.

Virtual reality compatibility has been implemented into the game post-release, supporting both the HTC Vive and Oculus Rift, and was released in late June 2017.

=== Soundtrack ===
The Scanner Sombre Soundtrack had been created by Alistair Lindsay, it was released as a free download on 14 August, 2018. The soundtrack also includes a bonus track entitled "Behind the scenes with the composer", which involves Alistair Lindsay talking about some behind the scenes information regarding their time working on the Soundtrack for Scanner Sombre and what led up to it.

== Reception ==
Reception

Aggregate score
Aggregator	Score
Metacritic	67/100

Scanner Sombre received "mixed or average" reviews from professional critics according to review aggregator website Metacritic.

The game sold only 6000 copies upon its release. Introversion Software's Chris Delay claimed that the developer was very disappointed with the game's sales and that it had "bombed in a big way".
