= Prison Architect 2 =

Upcoming video game

- Developers: Double Eleven; Kokku
- Publisher: Paradox Interactive
- Platforms: PlayStation 5; Windows; Xbox Series X/S
- Genre: Construction and management simulation
- Mode: Single-player

Prison Architect 2 is an upcoming private prison construction and management simulation video game developed by Double Eleven and Kokku, and published by Paradox Interactive. It is a sequel to Prison Architect, featuring full 3D gameplay. The game has been delayed indefinitely for performance and content improvements.

== Gameplay ==
Prison Architect 2 is developed as a full 3D video game. This is an evolution from its predecessor, which was a top-down 2D game with a partial 3D mode. The game will allow players to construct prisons over multiple floors.

== Development and release ==
The game was revealed in January 2024 by Paradox Interactive, who acquired the title from Introversion Software in 2019. The game was initially developed by Double Eleven, who took over the developing duty of the first installment after the acquisition. However, a change in development studio was announced by Paradox Interactive on 13 May 2024, as Paradox Interactive and Double Eleven were unable to reach a commercial agreement. Kokku, who had been working alongside Double Eleven since mid 2023, were to take over development of the title.

Initially slated for release on 26 March 2024, the game was announced with a delay to 7 May 2024 in order to "fix more bugs and further optimize the game for all platforms". It was then further delayed to 3 September 2024 as the team encountered "new technical challenges". On 2 August 2024, the game was delayed indefinitely in the aim to improve the game's performance and quality.

On 14 January 2026, Paradox Interactive announced that sign-ups had opened for a closed beta test beginning on 19 January 2026, with participation limited and requiring selected testers to sign a non-disclosure agreement. The game received another new closed beta test in April 2026.
