= Boatmurdered =

Dwarf Fortress Let's Play

A screenshot of Boatmurdered. Depicted here are a herd of elephants (represented by gray Es in Dwarf Fortress' ASCII artstyle) about to be overtaken by an approaching wave of magma.

Boatmurdered is a Let's Play of the video game Dwarf Fortress. The Let's Play was collaboratively produced by 14 members of the Something Awful forums from November 2006 to March 2007.

The 14 participants of Boatmurdered were tasked with overseeing the development of an in-game fortress, with each participant managing the fortress for one year of in-game time before relinquishing it to the next player. Boatmurdered is largely presented as a contiguous narrative, with participants recounting gameplay happenings while roleplaying as the fictional leaders of "Boatmurdered", the titular fortress and setting of the Let's Play. As the Let's Play progresses, the fortress experiences a rapid decline; many of its inhabitants suffer violent deaths, and survivors create idiosyncratic, macabre works of art that depict the fortress' violent history.

Boatmurdered has been praised as an example of Dwarf Fortress' potential for emergent storytelling, and credited for introducing both Dwarf Fortress and the Let's Play format to a broader audience.

== Background ==
=== Succession Game ===
Dwarf Fortress released into public alpha in August 2006. In Dwarf Fortress, the player indirectly controls a group of dwarves, assigning labor and issuing commands, generally towards the goal of constructing a successful and wealthy fortress. There are multiple threats that can hinder players working towards this goal, such as hostile fauna, raiding parties from enemy factions, and dwarves acting counter-productively due to poor mood and unmet needs.

On November 9, 2006, Something Awful forum member "TouretteDog" created a thread inviting other members to participate in a "Dwarf Fortress Succession Game"; each participant would manage the fortress for one year of in-game time, save their progress in the game, and send their save to the next participant so they could continue where the last player left off.

The events of the Succession Game were documented by participants and posted in the Something Awful thread. These updates came in the form of game screenshots and written prose, often written from the perspective of the latest, newly appointed fictional ruler of "Boatmurdered", the name of the in-game fortress. Each participant would use the bespoke avatar of their ruler to comment on game events from an in-universe perspective, often while deriding the managerial decisions made by the previous "ruler".

At the time of game start, Dwarf Fortress had only been publicly available for three months. As such, Boatmurdered is a gameplay account of a significantly dated build of Dwarf Fortress, predating the addition of a 3D playing field by nearly a year, and the addition of non-ASCII graphics by over 15 years.

=== Participants ===
14 forum members ultimately participated in Boatmurdered, managing the fortress for a combined 14 years of in-game time. Two participants played twice, both managing the fortress for two non-consecutive years. A further two participants failed to complete the full in-game year of gameplay within the timeframe stipulated by the Succession Game's rules; as they were unable to submit an acceptable save, subsequent players used the last save submitted before the forfeited player's turn, creating two "dead end" branches of Boatmurdered.

== Outline ==
In the year 1050, a group of dwarven settlers establish a new fortress in a remote region populated with dangerous wildlife. In the first years of the fortress' existence, the dwarves are frequently harassed by wild elephants and goblins, who force the dwarves to retreat into the safety of their cliffside fortress.

During the year 1055, a large herd of elephants kills many of the fortress' dwarves. The fortress is put into lockdown, with the elephants effectively laying siege to the fortress from the outside. In an attempt to kill the elephants, the dwarves begin constructing a device capable of channeling magma to the surface.

In 1057, a dwarf inadvertently mines into an underground lake and unleashes a torrent of water that threatens to flood the outside world. To counter this, the now-finished magma channel is opened to the outside, causing large quantities of magma and water to collide and produce massive amounts of scalding steam. All dwarves and animals caught outside of the fortress are burnt to death. The wall engravings and fine art the dwarves produce following these events is noted by the participants of Boatmurdered to be particularly macabre, depicting the death of dwarves by both elephants and fire.

By 1063, the magma channel is being used as an implement to cull the elephant population via mass burning, at the expense of everything outside the fortress walls. One day, the magma channel is opened prior to the arrival of a trading caravan, all of whom quickly burn to death. A fixture of the fortress catches on fire from the magma flood, filling the fortress with thick smoke for weeks. The smoke causes many of the fortress' inhabitants to spiral into depression or insanity. Sankis, a skilled dwarf and avatar of a previous Boatmurdered player, goes insane. While on fire, Sankis kills several dwarves before succumbing to his injuries.

In 1064, large fires burn throughout the fortress and kill all of its remaining inhabitants, except a dwarven child taking refuge in a room filled with bones. The unsalvageable fortress is retired by the final participant of Boatmurdered, with the child deemed the "ruler of Boatmurdered".

== Legacy ==
Boatmurdered is widely considered the most famous piece of Dwarf Fortress media, and has been credited for generating interest in the game during its early development. Rock Paper Shotgun contributor Sin Vega credited Boatmurdered for helping to popularize the Let's Play format. Writing for Vue Weekly, Darren Zenko said of Boatmurdered: "The writing is spotty, as you'd expect from an ad-hoc rota of geeks, ranging from workmanlike to comedy gold, but without the example provided by their tale – complete with marauding elephants, genocidal lava traps, grand achievements, hubristic vanity projects and eventual mass insanity – I'd never have had the will to force my head into DFs maddening depths." Tarn Adams, the lead designer of Dwarf Fortress, remarked that Boatmurdered "had me laughing my ass off".

Boatmurdered would later be referenced directly in Dwarf Fortress; the music track which plays when a player's fortress is lost (through extinction or abandonment) is titled "Koganusân", the name of Boatmurdered's fortress in the game's fictional dwarvish language.

The Boatmurdered character Sankis is referenced in the Blizzard Entertainment video game Diablo III, where a battle axe's name and description allude to the character's final moments.
