= Songbringer =

2017 video game

- Developer: Wizard Fu Games
- Publishers: Wizard Fu Games; Double Eleven
- Designer: Nathanael Weiss
- Programmer: Nathanael Weiss
- Artist: Nathanael Weiss
- Composer: Nathanael Weiss
- Platforms: Linux, macOS, Microsoft Windows, Xbox One, PlayStation 4, Nintendo Switch, iOS
- Release: Linux, macOS, Windows, Xbox One; 1 September 2017; PlayStation 4; 5 September 2017; Switch; 31 May 2018
- Genre: Action role-playing
- Mode: Single-player

Songbringer is a 2017 action role-playing game developed by Wizard Fu Games.

== Gameplay ==
Songbringer is an action role-playing game played from a top-down perspective.

== Development and release ==
Songbringer was developed by Nathanael Weiss under the moniker of his one-man video game studio Wizard Fu Games. Nintendo's The Legend of Zelda series was a large influence for Weiss who aimed to create a procedurally generated Zelda game with Songbringer.

The game was crowdfunded through Kickstarter in 2015. The game was released for Linux, MacOS, Windows, and Xbox One on 1 September 2017, and PlayStation 4 on 5 September.

== Reception ==
Reception

Aggregate score
Aggregator	Score
Metacritic	PC: 68/100; XONE: 65/100; PS4: 71/100; NS: 75/100

Songbringer received "mixed or average" reviews from professional critics according to review aggregator website Metacritic. It was nominated for "Role Playing Game" at The Independent Game Developers' Association Awards.
