= Introversion Software =

British independent games developer

Introversion Software Limited
- Type: Private
- Industry: Video games
- Founded: 2001; 25 years ago
- Headquarters: Walton-on-Thames, England
- Key people: Chris Delay; Mark Morris; John Knottenbelt; Thomas Arundel
- Products: Uplink; Darwinia; DEFCON; Multiwinia; Subversion; Prison Architect; Scanner Sombre; The Last Starship
- Number of employees: 12 (2017)
- Website: introversion.co.uk

Introversion Software Limited is a British video game developer based in Walton-on-Thames, England.

Introversion is mostly widely known for creating the top-down tycoon management simulation game Prison Architect, which was inspired by Dwarf Fortress and went on to inspire RimWorld.

== History ==
The company was founded in 2001 by three friends, Chris Delay, Mark Morris, and Thomas Arundel, who met as undergraduates at Imperial College London. The company originally labelled itself "the last of the bedroom programmers" due to the trio working out of their homes – they moved into an office when working on their fourth game, Multiwinia. Their first released video game, Uplink, was programmed and designed almost exclusively by Chris, while Mark and Tom handled marketing, materials and the other business elements. Their small initial investment enabled them to buy CD-Rs and printer cartridges. Early copies of the game were handmade. The company was able to fully make back their investment within a few hours of accepting orders. A large community formed, and the team, along with a new programmer Andy Bainbridge, started work on two new games.

Darwinia was released to much critical acclaim and was eventually re-released via Steam on 14 December 2005 On 29 September 2006, Introversion Software launched its third game, DEFCON. Shortly after, Introversion had measured their bandwidth in terabytes for the first time. After the release of DEFCON, Introversion began work on a game called Subversion. Their next game, however, was Multiwinia, a multiplayer follow-up to Darwinia, and was released on 19 September 2008.

Darwinia and Multiwinia were ported for the Xbox 360. This resulted in the eventual release of Darwinia+, which included both games, to the Xbox Live Arcade on 10 February 2010.

=== Subversion delay and Prison Architect ===
After the release of Multiwinia in 2008, Introversion announced the commencement of working on a game called Subversion in December of that year. This was followed by a series of blog-posts about the development of the game and its procedurally generated urban areas and the game was shown at the World of Love event in 2010. In October 2011, after three years in development, Subversion was announced as delayed.

Their new game was announced as Prison Architect during the Humble Indie Bundle release of Introversion games and tech demos of Subversion material, along with a treasure hunt of information on the new game hidden within the tech demos.

== Financial history and independence ==
After a low-key launch, Uplink was a critical and commercial success for Introversion. A visit to E3 2002 saw the team "rinse £10k in a week on speedboats and fast cars", but regret soon set in as they watched their income steadily decline, since "in the games industry, you make 75% of your total revenue for the product in the first 6 months". By December 2002, then-publisher Strategy First had stopped paying royalties for Uplink; they would later file a Consumer Proposal, but were acquired by Silverstar Holdings in early 2005. Even with the cash flow from direct sales, Introversion ran out of money in the middle of 2003. The company hovered on the edge of bankruptcy, with the team selling most of their worldly goods, as their second project and only hope for funds—Darwinia—"slipped relentlessly".

Darwinia was eventually released in March 2005, but despite a strong opening weekend, sales soon slipped too low to sustain the company. Within six months, the developers were back on UK government benefits until November, when they contacted Valve "on a whim" to try to set up a digital distribution deal on their Steam platform. Valve responded enthusiastically and, following a 14 December 2005 online launch, digital sales, which exposed the game to a new, global audience, kept the company going through to the release of their third game, DEFCON.

On 15 September 2006, the day DEFCON pre-orders were made available, Introversion spent their last £1500. Fortuitously, the game "did much much better than [they] ever imagined" and funds for at least the forthcoming twelve months quickly rolled in to replace it. Seemingly financially secure, the company placed their eventual success largely at Valve's feet: "Steam has made Introversion a commercial success", Tom Arundel is quoted saying.

By early 2010, the company was back in financial trouble. After spending over a year porting Darwinia+ to the Xbox 360, the game was not successful at launch. "It just really bombed. We missed the entire audience, I think", director Mark Morris said. The launch was in fact so poor, the company was able to tell in the first 10 minutes that it would not make enough money to save the company. At this time the company was so deeply in debt that by continuing operation the Directors faced criminal prosecution under UK insolvency law. "Tom (Arundel) spent a lot of time in those final days genuinely convinced that we were trading insolvently, probably trading insolvently, which is a criminal offense. So he was arguing that we needed to stop immediately, completely down tools, or there was a very real possibility that we would face prosecution".

Slowly Introversion's finances changed again. In Q3 2010 the company was able to add Steam achievements to DEFCON which resulted in the game being prominently featured in a sale. Morris credits the $250,000 generated by the Steam promotion as saving the company. Later, Introversion's games were featured in a Humble Indie Bundle that launched in November 2011. The "Humble Introversion Bundle" sold 190,261 bundles and generated $779,026.33. Introversion used the money for the ongoing development of their next game, entitled Prison Architect.

As of 26 September 2015, Prison Architect had grossed over $19 million in sales, and over 1.25 million units of the game had been sold. By the end of August 2016 when the final version '2.0' of Prison Architect was released, the number of individual players was given as two million.

Their next title, Scanner Sombre, was released in April 2017, after a 9 month development stage. The game sold only 6000 copies upon its release. Chris Delay remarked that it had "bombed in a big way". Virtual reality compatibility has been implemented into the game post-release, supporting both the HTC Vive and Oculus Rift, and was released in late June 2017, marking the developer's first (and to date only) foray into VR.

In January 2019, Introversion and Paradox Interactive announced that the Prison Architect intellectual property was being sold on to Paradox for an undisclosed fee, so that Introversion could concentrate on new projects while Paradox continued to support and expand on the property.

On 28 May 2022, Introversion announced their new science fiction themed video game The Last Starship, which released in early access on 15 February 2023. It was released out of early access on 3 February 2026.

== Games ==
- Uplink (2001)
- Darwinia (2005)
- DEFCON (2006)
- Multiwinia (2008)
- Darwinia+ (2010)
- Prison Architect (2015)
- Scanner Sombre (2017)
- The Last Starship (2026)

=== Other projects ===
- Subversion (cancelled)
- Chronometer (optioned but not developed)
- Wrong Wire (cancelled)
- Order of Magnitude (cancelled)
- Spacebots (cancelled)
- Megaprocessor (cancelled)
- Voxel Factory (cancelled)
- Nanotech (cancelled)
- Deep Space Industrial (cancelled)
- Praxis (cancelled)
