= List of fictional humanoid species in comics =

This is a list of fictional humanoid species in comics, and is subsidiary to the Lists of humanoids. It is a collection of various notable humanoid species that are featured in comics, including comic strips, comic book publications or manga.

Species	First appearance	Publisher	Notes
Daxamite	Superboy #89 (June 1961)	DC Comics	The Daxamites are a humanoid species originating from the planet Daxam. They possess a similar appearance and abilities to Kryptonians, but are vulnerable to lead rather than kryptonite.
Guardians of the Universe	Green Lantern (vol. 2) #1 (July 1960)	DC Comics	Alternatively known as the Guardians or Oans, the Guardians of the Universe are a blue-skinned humanoid species who were among the first sentient life to evolve. Originally the size of a human, the Guardians evolved into shorter forms after migrating to the planet Oa.
Kree	Fantastic Four #65 (August 1967)	Marvel Comics	Also known as the Ruul, the Kree originate from the planet Hala in the Large Magellanic Cloud. They resemble humans, but have either blue or pink skin and thrive in environments rich in nitrogen. The Kree cannot survive under Earth's atmosphere, which has less nitrogen than Hala, without using artificial life-support devices.
Kryptonian	Action Comics #1 (June 1938)	DC Comics	A humanoid species from the planet Krypton. Kryptonians are physically indistinguishable from humans, but possess a variety of superpowers fueled by solar energy.
Homo mermanus	Motion Picture Funnies Weekly #1 (April 1939)	Marvel Comics	An aquatic species from the underwater kingdom of Atlantis. The most notable member of the race is Namor the Sub-Mariner.
New Gods	New Gods #1 (February 1971)	DC Comics	A humanoid species from the planets New Genesis and Apokolips. The two planets were once one planet called Urgrund, which was split in two during the events of Ragnarök and the death of the Old Gods.
Olympian	Journey into Mystery Annual #1 (June 1965)	Marvel Comics	A species in the Marvel Comics universe, based loosely on the Twelve Olympians and other deities of Greek mythology.
Pillar Men	JoJo's Bizarre Adventure part 2: "Battle Tendency" Chapter 46: #12	Weekly Shōnen Jump	An Aztec race of humanoid creatures that are the main antagonists in the second arc of JoJo's Bizarre Adventure.
Rock Humans	JoJo's Bizarre Adventure part 8: "JoJolion" (April 2014)	Ultra Jump	A species that are similar to humans, but have a silicon-based physiology. They follow a 1-3 month hibernation period, starting at different times on an individual basis.
Shi'ar	X-Men #97 (February 1976)	Marvel Comics	A humanoid species with avian traits whose empire is situated close to the Skrull and Kree empires. They were created by writer Chris Claremont and artist Dave Cockrum.
Skrull	Fantastic Four #2 (January 1962)	Marvel Comics	A humanoid species from the planet Skrullos. They are similar to humans, but possess green skin, pointed ears, and shapeshifting abilities.
Thanagarian	Flash Comics #1 (1940)	DC Comics	An advanced science-based species from the planet Thanagar, which orbits the star Polaris. Thanagar is run by a single government called the Ruling Council.
Watchers	Fantastic Four #13 (April 1963)	Marvel Comics	A humanoid species who are among the oldest species in the universe. They watch over the events of the multiverse and have a clause that prevents them from interfering.
