= Multiwinia =

2008 video game

Multiwinia: Survival of the Flattest
- Developer: Introversion Software
- Publishers: Introversion Software (Windows); Ambrosia Software (Mac OS X)
- Designers: Chris Delay; Gary Chambers; Leander Hambley; Byron Atkinson-Jones
- Platforms: Windows; Mac OS X Linux; Xbox 360
- Release: Windows: NA: 19 September 2008; EU: 10 October 2008; OS X 5 March 2009; Xbox 360; 10 February 2010; Linux; 12 December 2012 (Steam)
- Genre: Real-time strategy
- Modes: Single-player, multiplayer

Multiwinia: Survival of the Flattest is a real-time strategy video game by Introversion Software. Multiwinia is available as a standalone game, or included as part of Darwinia+.

== Plot ==
Multiwinia follows its predecessor Darwinia, in which a computer scientist, Dr Sepulveda, created a digital world that existed within a computer network. This world, Darwinia, was inhabited by a two-dimensional digital life-form called Darwinians and was to become "the world's first digital theme park". In Darwinia, the player eradicated a computer virus that infected the world and threatened the life of the Darwinians. After this, Dr Sepulveda deemed the world safe again, while being concerned about the fact the Darwinians once had to fight their infected kin. Over time they became more aggressive, dividing into factions and fighting. Now labelled Multiwinians, the tribes continue to fight each other.

== Gameplay ==
Multiwinia is a real-time strategy game with six different modes. Each mode is designed to support between one and four players (human or CPU) and up to 50 unique maps of varying difficulties. As a multiplayer, and much more processed randomly generated universe version of Darwinia's, it has statistically inspired a random stochastic layered atmosphere.

- Domination

Each team fights to control the entire map.

Teams fight over the spawn points dotted around the map in order to capture them and achieve a dominant position that will enable them to control the entire map. This game mode will continue until one team is victorious, or a timer can be used to limit the game to a set time limit. After that time the team with the most spawn points will win the game.

- King of the Hill

Two Multiwinian tribes battling in the King of the Hill game-mode

Occupy key tactical zones around the map to score points.

On each map there are a fixed number of Scoring zones - for a standard sized two-player map there are up to four zones. Each team can score points by occupying these zones with Multiwinians - scoring one point per second for every zone under their control.

Scoring zones often become areas of heavy fighting, and are frequently occupied by several teams at once, all in intense combat. In this case, the team with the largest share of the zone will be scoring the points, and this is shown by rendering the Scoring zone as a "pie chart", showing the team colours occupying the zone and their relative percentages.

- Capture the Statue

Multiwinians must lift the giant stone statues that appear in the Statue Zone, and carry them safely back to their base to score points.

Large numbers of Multiwinians are required to lift the heavy statues, and they move very slowly. If the Multiwinians carrying a statue are killed, it is dropped and remains where it is until more Multiwinians pick it up. If it is dropped heavily (e.g. on the edge of a steep hill) the statue shatters, and re-appears randomly in one of the Statue Zones.

Each team has a base near their start point, into which they must lift the statue to score a point. The winner is the team that has successfully carried the most number of statues to their base.

- Rocket Riot

Each team has a giant rocket at their start point, and in order to win they must refuel and occupy the rocket, and perform a successful launch.

Each team must complete several stages in order to successfully launch their rocket. First it must be refueled, and then occupied by 100 Multiwinian astronauts. Once occupied a launch countdown begins and upon completion the rocket launches. The team that first launches its rocket wins the game.

Fuel for the rocket is generated by several fuel pumps, located around the map. These fuel pumps are the key to winning Rocket Riot - the team must occupy and control the solar panels which work the fuel pumps, in order to divert their fuel into the rocket.

At any point during these phases, the rocket is extremely vulnerable to explosions. If the rocket is successfully attacked by an enemy team it will explode, burning all the fuel and all the Multiwinians inside, and resetting the rocket to its starting point.

- Blitzkrieg

Each team tries to capture the enemy's flag while defending their own.

Each team starts with a flag. A number of other flags are spread across the map, and in order to win the game, a team must capture flags which link their own flag to their opponents' flags. When a team loses its flag, it is eliminated from the game - the last team standing (the one which has kept hold of its flag until the end of the game) wins. Each team's flag is well-protected, and each team receives regular reinforcements of Multiwinians throughout the match.

- Assault

One team must defend a weapon of mass destruction (WMD) that will explode within a defined time period, whilst the other team must attack and destroy the WMD before the time period elapses. Play then switches around and the attacker becomes the defender and vice versa. The winner is the team that successfully attacks in the quickest time.

The attacking team receives a constant flow of reinforcements whilst the defending team is heavily armed with turrets, but has a limited force. The attacking team must build up a force and attack in waves to capture machine gun turrets, pillboxes and sabotage the three control stations connected to the bomb. The constant reinforcements provided to the attacking team ensure that eventually they will break through - the challenge is for the defending team to hold off for as long as possible.

== Reception ==
Reception

Aggregate score
Aggregator	Score
Metacritic	76/100

Review scores
Publication	Score
1Up.com	C+
Eurogamer	8/10
GameSpot	7.5/10
IGN	7.6/10
PALGN	8/10
PC Format	82%
PC Gamer (US)	79%
PC PowerPlay	8/10
PC Zone	71%
VideoGamer.com	7/10
The A.V. Club	B+

The game received "generally favorable reviews" according to the review aggregation website Metacritic.

Eurogamer called the game "a quirky but devilishly compelling distillation of all that strategy games can be". IGN cited the crate power ups as the game's "most questionable element" and stated, "while it's still undoubtedly fun as a lightweight experience, it's far from being cerebrally rewarding or especially clever." PC Gamer UK said the game was "endearing, yet thin". GameWatcher called Multiwinia "A true triumph."
