= Uplink (video game) =

2001 video game

- Developer: Introversion Software
- Publishers: EU: Introversion Software; NA: Strategy First; Ambrosia Software (Mac)
- Designers: Chris Delay; Mark Morris; Thomas Arundel
- Platforms: Windows, Linux, Mac OS, Mac OS X, iOS, Android
- Release: 1 October 2001: Windows; EU: 1 October 2001; NA: 11 March 2003; Linux; NA: 11 March 2003; EU: October 2011; Mac; NA: 27 May 2003; WW: 12 July 2012; iOS; WW: 7 June 2012; Android; WW: 15 August 2012
- Genre: Hacking simulation
- Mode: Single player

Uplink (also known in North America as Uplink: Hacker Elite) is a simulation video game released in 2001 by the British company Introversion Software. The player takes charge of a freelance computer hacker in a fictional futuristic 2010, and must break into foreign computers, complete contracts and purchase new hardware to hack into increasingly harder computer systems.

The game, which was Introversion's first release, was generally well received in Europe, and was released in North America by the publisher Strategy First as Uplink: Hacker Elite in 2003. Uplink was later ported to Android and iOS systems in 2012.

== Plot ==
In the game, the player assumes the role of a hacker in the year 2010, who begins work for the Uplink Corporation, a worldwide company providing work for hackers. The player amasses money, software, gateway hardware and skill in the course of performing jobs for various clients, and hacking servers of global corporations for profit.

The storyline of the game typically begins with the player receiving a delayed e-mail from a deceased top ranking Uplink agent concerning the research done by a faction within the Andromeda Research Corporation (ARC) known as the Andromeda group, (Note: This email can be discovered by the player before it is sent, providing an alternate path.) that is described as an "anti-capitalist, techno-anarchist" group. The agent was contracted to aid in engineering a destructive computer virus known as Revelation in an attempt to destroy the Internet. A rival company, Arunmor, attempts to counter ARC's plans by developing Faith, a counter virus that can purge Revelation.

The player can choose to side with ARC or Arunmor or even ignore the plot in its entirety, concentrating on freelance hacking, in which case the storyline plays out without the player's participation with Arunmor ultimately stopping Revelation, though not before some in-game servers and computer systems are infected and destroyed by the virus.

During the missions Andromeda contracts a hacker to steal files from "The Darwin Project," digital lifeforms that exist and reproduce on the internet. The sophisticated artificial intelligence technology is used to improve Revelation, helping it spread quickly and autonomously. Numerous attacks on ARC and Arunmor systems also occur in the storyline, including a mission leading the chief technical director of Arunmor being framed for bank fraud. The government is also helping fund Arunmor's Faith project, and is closely monitoring ARC, though they lack concrete evidence to warrant raiding the site or arresting any employees.

Regardless of the player's choices, Revelation will eventually be completed and unleashed upon the world, thus beginning the endgame. If the player has supported Arunmor, they are tasked with running a counter-operation, hacking into infected systems and using Faith to restore them before they are destroyed. Revelation is wiped out completely, and the damning evidence against Andromeda leads to a federal raid and the subsequent arrest of suspected staff members in the company, along with a number of Uplink agents. The leader of Andromeda then issues a statement, making no apologies for releasing Revelation; he argues that the internet has become a mere extension of Western capitalism to serve the interest of elites, rather than the bastion of free speech and anonymity it once was. He claims that people will never be safe on the web – their entire lives are on file and anyone can tamper with their personal information at will. The leader denounces Arunmor, claiming they are simply profiteering off the crisis and are a yet another symptom of capitalist overreach. He is sentenced to 8 years in prison, and ARC shuts down operations. Arunmor also releases Faith as a commercial antivirus software causing their stock share price to reach a new high.

In contrast, if the player supports Andromeda, the group instructs them to unleash Revelation on the world, infecting as many systems as they can to overwhelm Faith and render every computer in the world inoperable. If the player is successful, the virus claims their own Uplink gateway, ending the game immediately and implying Andromeda have succeeded in their goal. If the player fails to cause enough infections within fifteen minutes, federal agents seize their equipment and arrest them, dooming the Revelation project to a premature end.

== Style ==
Uplink focuses on emulating highly stylized, Hollywood-esque hacking, as seen in movies such as Hackers, Sneakers, WarGames and Swordfish. References to these movies can be found throughout the game, including joke servers for companies such as Steve Jackson Games (which in 1990 was raided by the Secret Service) and a nuclear missile control system from WarGames. It also features at least three references to the movie Sneakers, including one which can be found in the first version of the game (and was later removed in an update released by Introversion) which is a cheat code in which the user has to enter "TooManySecrets" (an anagram to the phrase "Setec Astronomy") as the username thus allowing them to access a cheat menu. Another reference to the anagram is the password "MySocratesNote", sent to the player in an e-mail which starts the plotline. In addition, the voice print sections use the phrase "Hello. I am the system administrator. My voice is my passport. Verify me." which is similar to the one Sneakers used.

The applications in Uplink are highly simplified, and almost fully automated, similar to depictions in movies such as Hackers.

Most of the 'hacking' is of the form: "there is a security system of type X, level Y that is stopping me from accessing or changing something I need to access or change, so I need to have an anti-X program of level Y+". There is some need for rapid selection of programs to run, but there is no actual difficulty in running them (provided that one can afford them).

The game has a certain number of unusual features, including an in-game IRC client and in earlier versions a multi-monitor feature requiring another copy of the game running on a second computer. The latter was removed in later versions due to lack of stability and popularity and, as it was called "Network", was often confused with multiplayer gaming (that the game does not offer).

== Soundtrack ==
The game uses several songs originally made in S3M, mod and xm format. The original song files are included on the bonus CD-ROM of the game, a disc that was originally given as a free addition to those who referred the game to others. The disc also includes several songs which were not used in the final game.

- The Blue Valley by Karsten Koch
- Deep in Her Eyes by Peter 'Skaven' Hajba
- Mystique Parts 1 and 2 by Robert 'Timelord' Gergely
- Symphonic by Simon 'Hollywood' Carless

== Release ==
Uplink was first released in October 2001, and was initially sold digitally and distributed by mail. The game was released for Microsoft Windows and Linux (2012) directly by Introversion, and ported to and released for Mac by Contraband and Ambrosia Software respectively. Chris Delay stated in an interview with PC Gamer UK that they did not pay for advertising of the game at all — it became known purely by word of mouth. A version released in the US was published and distributed by Strategy First under the title Uplink: Hacker Elite. Legal proceedings were undertaken when Strategy First filed for bankruptcy and ceased paying Introversion royalties, but the Hacker Elite version remains available from various sources. The game is now also available via Valve's Steam online distribution service, via GOG.com, as well as via the Ubuntu Software Center. Uplink was also released for iOS on 7 June 2012. An Android version debuted as part of The Humble Bundle for Android 3, on 15 August 2012.

== Hacker Elite royalties ==
A version released in the US was published and distributed by Strategy First under the title Uplink: Hacker Elite. Strategy First ran into financial difficulties, and ceased paying royalties to Introversion shortly before filing for bankruptcy protection, but continued to sell the game in competition with Introversion.

On 20 January 2006, Introversion announced they were taking legal action against all retailers of Uplink: Hacker Elite, except Stardock. It transpired that, while filing for bankruptcy would have caused a breach of contract, Strategy First persuaded Canadian courts to grant a moratorium preventing termination of the contract. Strategy First has resumed paying limited royalties.

Stores and services currently reselling Hacker Elite in North America include:

- Direct2Drive, IGN's digital distribution service (as of July 2006).
- Strategy First's online store.

As some versions of Uplink: Hacker Elite have been modified, many game mods and patches will not run with the Hacker Elite version.

== Reception ==
Reception

Aggregate score
Aggregator	Score	
Aggregator	iOS	PC
Metacritic	83/100	75/100

Review scores
Publication	Score	
Publication	iOS	PC
Eurogamer	N/A	7/10
GamesMaster	82%	80%
GameSpot	N/A	7.1/10
GameSpy	N/A	(2002) 73% (2003) 2/5
GameZone	N/A	7/10
IGN	N/A	7.5/10
PC Format	N/A	81%
PC Gamer (US)	N/A	80%
PC Zone	N/A	70%

The iOS and PC versions received "generally favorable reviews" according to the review aggregation website Metacritic.

The editors of Computer Gaming World presented Uplink: Hacker Elite with their 2003 "Adventure Game of the Year" award. They summarized it as "an immersive, original, and suspenseful little game."
