= RimWorld =

2018 video game

- Developers: Ludeon Studios; Double Eleven (consoles)
- Publishers: Ludeon Studios; Double Eleven (consoles)
- Designer: Tynan Sylvester
- Programmers: Tynan Sylvester; Piotr Walczak; Andrey Glazkov; Ben Rog-Wilhem
- Artists: Rho Watson; Ricardo Tomé
- Composer: Alistair Lindsay
- Engine: Unity (pre-1.7); Waylith (1.7 onwards)
- Platforms: Linux; macOS; Windows; PlayStation 4; Xbox One
- Release: Linux, macOS, Windows; October 17, 2018; PS4, Xbox One; July 29, 2022
- Genre: Construction and management simulation
- Mode: Single-player

RimWorld is a construction and management simulation video game developed by Canadian game designer Tynan Sylvester and published by Ludeon Studios. Originally called Eclipse Colony, it was initially released as a Kickstarter crowdfunding project in early access for Microsoft Windows, macOS, and Linux in November 2013, and version 1.0 was released on October 17, 2018. The game was ported to the PlayStation 4 and Xbox One as RimWorld Console Edition on July 29, 2022, with development and publishing being handled by Double Eleven. Rather than a test of skill or a challenge, the game is intended to be a "story generator" run by different computer "storytellers", where the game is used as the medium for players to experience narrative adventures.

== Gameplay ==
The objective of the game is to ensure the survival of a colony of people ("pawns"), fighting against various environmental and internal events through randomly generated events in a customizable world. As the game progresses, events become progressively harder and the player can unlock more advanced technology through research. The game is two-dimensional, viewed from a top down perspective.

In-game events are procedurally generated by a "storyteller" algorithm; game difficulty, event difficulty, and difficulty progression depend on its settings. The storyteller will analyze the player's current situation and choose events based on what it assesses will make the most interesting narrative. The game has three pre-configured storytellers: "Cassandra Classic", who follows traditional storytelling techniques of rising and falling tension; "Phoebe Chillax", who allows for additional downtime between events; and "Randy Random", who forsakes a narrative altogether in favor of randomness and excitement. There are 6 different preset difficulties to choose from, along with a custom difficulty option. These presets influence the severity and frequency of events, as well as the balance of positive and negative events.

Events can range from simple occurrences, such as a caravan of traders passing by or spacecraft debris crash landing, to catastrophic long-lasting events, such as cold snaps or volcanic winters. Combat events randomly occur throughout the game, and the player will have to defend the colony by either drafting their colonists or by building defensive mechanisms, such as traps and automated turrets. Ducking behind cover, such as trees, walls, or sandbags, gives pawns a much lower chance of being hit by projectiles during firefights. The game has two save-modes: Commitment mode acts as RimWorld's permadeath mode, disabling manual saving, while the "reload anytime" mode allows the player to save and load freely, giving the player a chance to undo an event.

The colony starts with a predetermined number of pawns. Each pawn has a randomly generated background, set of traits and skills, and relations with other pawns, which affect how they can contribute to or endanger the progress and efficiency of the colony, and how they may interact with other pawns. Colonists are not directly controlled by the player themselves, but instead given tasks and orders to be completed (e.g. build a wall, tailor a shirt, etc.), with a priority system that can be assigned by the player. For combat encounters, colonists can be "drafted" and directed manually by the player. As time passes, more pawns may join the colony; they are able to be rescued after crash-landing on the player map, wander in, or be captured after a raid.

Pawns require food, rest, and shelter. They will request a place to sit while eating, well-made and undamaged clothes, and enough time for recreation, such as stargazing, cloud watching, or playing chess. If needs are left unmet, pawns may have "mental breaks" such as going into a daze, setting fires, or attacking other pawns. A pawn's mental stability is represented by a mood meter, affected by needs, personality traits, and backstories. Players combine hunting, farming, animal husbandry, and trading to meet their colonists' food needs. Wild animals can be lured and tamed with food, with certain animals having a chance to attack the tamer on a failed attempt. Upon taming, domestic animals can reproduce and can form relationships with human pawns. They may also be taught commands, which vary from simply obeying its master, assisting in combat, and occasionally hauling and storing items.

New technologies can be unlocked by constructing research stations. Assigning pawns to work at research stations allows their colony to progress along a tech tree, starting at tribal technologies, like simple clothing, all the way to space-age technology, like nuclear reactors for a spaceship. Once unlocked, electricity is produced via wind turbines, solar panels, or geothermal power stations. Other advancements include medicine, advanced weaponry, and drugs.

On December 20, 2016, Alpha version 16, titled "Wanderlust", was released. Many new features were added to the world map, including: a spherical world map; time-zones; factions now starting with several bases; the ability to travel across the whole world map; the ability to set up multiple colonies; world generation; and customizable world map parameters. It is possible for players to attack other bases and plunder resources from them, angering the attacked faction in the process.

Players are able to install modifications ("mods") that are distributed via the Steam Workshop, the game's official forums, or other mod websites. The game has an active modding community, which publishes mods from simple quality of life upgrades to complete gameplay overhauls.

=== Setting ===
RimWorld is set in the distant future, where humans are spread across the Milky Way galaxy but cannot travel faster than the speed of light. Planets and star systems develop isolated from each other, and while some societies advance technologically, others regress due to war or disease. As a result, there is a massive range of technological levels among societies, from Neolithic tribes to reality-transcending machine gods. Multiple starting scenarios are available to choose from, although the core narrative is largely the same. The player oversees colonists stranded on a procedurally generated planet located in the frontiers of known space and must contend with both the environment and hostile planet inhabitants to survive and eventually escape.

To end the game, the player must either research how to build and then make a spaceship, or find a broken-down ship with the help of a friendly AI. Once the ship is built, the player can initiate the 15 day start up sequence, during which the player must defend it for the duration of the ship start up as other desperate inhabitants of the planet attempt to seize control of it. After escaping the planet with at least one colonist, the credits roll. With the "Royalty" downloadable content (DLC), the game can end by hosting the High Stellarch, leader of one of the factions that inhabit the Rim, and leaving the colony with them. With the "Ideology" DLC, the player can end the game by selling the colony to other groups for parts of a map to eventually reach the Archonexus, a massive AI-controlled computer capable of controlling the entire planet. With "Anomaly", the player can end the game by awakening the Void, the main focus of the DLC. The "Odyssey" DLC adds an ending that requires destroying the orbital mechhive which controls all the mechanoids on the Rim.

== Development ==
Tynan Sylvester (born 1986 in Canada), the lead developer for RimWorld, had his first experience with game design by creating custom levels for Unreal Tournament as a middle schooler. In 2008, he joined Irrational Games and helped develop BioShock Infinite for four years before leaving the company in February 2012 to become an independent game developer. As he tried to figure out what sort of game he would develop, Sylvester made a series of prototypes of games resembling Project Zomboid, Smash TV, Football Manager, and Hitman. He settled on the RimWorld concept after a game test with friends one evening, during which two of them became so absorbed that they couldn't bring themselves to leave until 2 AM: "People were falling asleep but they still wanted to play". RimWorld was inspired by Dwarf Fortress and Firefly, and its art style by Prison Architect.

RimWorld was publicly revealed on September 15, 2013. A Kickstarter campaign was launched for RimWorld on October 2, 2013, which earned CA$268,132 in 30 days. The first public alpha build of the game came out on November 4, 2013. From 2013 to 2018, the development team hovered between two and three developers. The first beta version was released on November 18, 2017. The game went live on October 17, 2018. After release, the team scaled up to seven developers, allowing for the development of multiple projects in parallel. Originally developed for the Unity game engine, RimWorld switched to Ludeon's in-house Waylith engine starting with update 1.7, which released into beta in October 2026.

A console version for RimWorld was announced on June 29, 2022. The console version was developed by Double Eleven, with development beginning "long before" the PC version's Ideology expansion was released in July 2021. Key challenges during development were adapting the user interface for players without a keyboard as well as optimizing the game for console hardware. RimWorld Console Edition released for PlayStation 4 and Xbox One on 29 July 2022.

== Reception ==
Reception

Aggregate score
Aggregator	Score
Metacritic	PC: 87/100; XONE: 92/100

Review scores
Publication	Score
GameStar	85/100
IGN	9/10
PC Gamer (US)	74/100
Gry-Online	9.5/10
Strategy Gamer	5/5

RimWorld has received "generally favorable" reviews for Windows according to Metacritic, a review aggregator; the Xbox One version received "universal acclaim". Nomura Hikaru of IGN rated the game 9/10, describing it as "an all-in-one package for management simulation", and writing positively of the way it handled the player failing and its ability to tell a story. Sam Greer of PC Gamer gave a generally positive review, declaring that it was "a rich colony sim" and finding that its mid and late games were entertaining, while disliking the early game. Brendan Caldwell of Rock Paper Shotgun wrote positively of the game, commending its ability to create drama. RimWorld has been favorably compared to other management-survival games, including Dwarf Fortress.

In February 2018, Sylvester announced that RimWorld had sold over a million copies. By August 2020, it was estimated that RimWorld had accumulated well over 100 million dollars in revenue, making it one of the most popular indie games on Steam.

In 2016, RimWorld was voted Indie DB's "indie of the year". In 2018, RimWorld was voted Steam's Top User-Rated Game from all categories. The Academy of Interactive Arts & Sciences nominated RimWorld for "Strategy/Simulation Game of the Year" during the 22nd Annual D.I.C.E. Awards. In 2020, RimWorld was ranked the best management game on the PC by Rock Paper Shotgun.

=== Legacy ===
A team of RimWorld modders responsible for the Combat Extended mod went on to create Ascent of Ashes, a colony simulation game inspired by RimWorld that was planned to be released in early access in November 2023, but was pushed back to July 2025. Ascent of Ashes released in early access on July 25, 2025. Another game that took inspiration from RimWorld was Palworld, an action-adventure, survival, and monster-taming game that released as early access in January 2024.

== Downloadable content ==
On February 24, 2020, the first downloadable content, "Royalty", was released with the 1.1 update, adding a new empire faction and psylink technology for colonists to use. It introduces royal titles, mechanoid clusters, 13 new original songs, and additional quests, body implants, and types of weapons.

On July 20, 2021, the second DLC, "Ideology", was released with the 1.3 update, adding belief systems based around several memes which make up the core of the ideology. Each ideology adds new buildings, apparel, quests, and social roles. As a part of the free update which released alongside it, new raid types, animal pens, mortar barrels, and caravan reworks were added.

On October 21, 2022, the third DLC, "Biotech", was released alongside the 1.4 update. The DLC introduces a new mechanoid building mechanic, allowing the construction of robots named mechanoids that can assist the colony with labor or combat, the ability for colonists to become pregnant and raise new families, and new options to genetically modify colonists into xenohumans granting special abilities and traits. New factions with xenohumans are added, ranging from super soldiers to Neanderthals. Pollution emitted from constructed mechanoids can cause severe damage to colonies by causing sickness, sun blockage from smog, and the awakening of hibernating underground creatures.

On March 13, 2024, the fourth DLC, "Anomaly", was announced on X. The DLC adds more horror gameplay aspects. It was released on April 11, accompanied with a free major update which integrated popular mods into the base game.

On June 11, 2025, a fifth DLC, "Odyssey", was announced to be released alongside the 1.6 update. This DLC focuses on expanding exploration and adds features such as player-built gravships, additional environments for players to explore, and new landmarks, animals, and equipment. "Odyssey" was released on July 11, 2025, a month after it was announced.

== Temporary ban in Australia ==
In February 2022, a previously unannounced port of the game for consoles was refused classification by the Australian Classification Board for its depictions of drug use. The game was pulled from the digital storefront Steam for Australian users without input from the developers, who stated that they were unsure of the reasoning but were "working to resolve this situation and make RimWorld available to everyone again as soon as possible". On April 20, 2022, the game was classified as R18+ in Australia, and it was made available on Steam again.
