= Atlyss =

Upcoming video game

- Developer: Kiseff
- Publisher: KisSoft
- Composer: Kiseff
- Platform: Windows
- Genre: Action role-playing
- Modes: Single-player, multiplayer (supporting up to 16 players)

Atlyss (stylized in all caps) is an upcoming action role-playing game developed by indie developer Kiseff. It is published by Kiseff under the name KisSoft. Demos of the game were available through itch.io from 2021, and it was released in early access through Steam on November 22, 2024. An official release date has yet to be announced.

The game features playable anthropomorphic animals that explore and fight in an open world akin to those found in massively multiplayer online role-playing games (MMORPGs). It is designed with particular appeal towards the furry fandom with its suggestive character designs, but pointedly contains "nothing explicit". The graphic design of the game resembles that of games released on the PlayStation 2.

== Gameplay ==
Atlyss is a 3D action role-playing game structured similar to MMORPGs, in that players complete quests and fight monsters to level up. The player is given the option to choose a class—Fighter, Mystic, or Bandit—at level 10, which provides specialized skills. Some quests can be repeated multiple times, allowing for more effective experience gains through collecting items and fighting enemies.

The player can perform a variety of emotes, which are mainly used for social interaction, though the "taunt" command can be used to pacify enemies. Some emotes, such as "sit" and "dance", differ depending on the player's chosen race.

== Plot ==
The player, a lost soul called to the Sanctum, is tasked by Angela to explore the surrounding world and attune to sigils connected to places of power. (As of July 2025) the story stops following the defeat of the Valdur, a large boss enemy at the end of the Crescent Grove (20-25) dungeon, the last area that has available quests.

== Reception ==
Atlyss has received "overwhelmingly positive" ratings on Steam as of one week after its release through the service, and has maintained player counts of over 5,000 for that week and beyond, with a peak of 10,000 players per day. Harvey Randall, writing for PC Gamer, recommended the game for all fans of RPGs.
