= Darwinia (video game) =

2005 video game

- Developer: Introversion Software
- Publishers: Introversion Software (Windows/Linux); Ambrosia Software (Mac OS X); Cinemaware Marquee/eGames (U.S.); Stomp (Australia)
- Designer: Chris Delay
- Composers: Timothy Lamb; Mathieu Stempell
- Platforms: Microsoft Windows; Linux; Mac OS X Xbox 360
- Release: Windows: EU: 4 March 2005; NA: 12 June 2006; Linux; 18 March 2005; Mac; 30 March 2005; Steam; 14 December 2005; MSN Games; 31 January 2007; Xbox 360; 10 February 2010
- Genres: Real-time tactics, real-time strategy
- Mode: Single-player

Darwinia is a 2005 real-time tactics and real-time strategy video game for Microsoft Windows, Mac OS X and Linux. It is the second game developed by Introversion Software, and is set within a computer environment that simulates artificial intelligence. It received favourable reviews and won three awards at the 2006 Independent Games Festival. A multiplayer sequel, Multiwinia, was released for Windows in 2008. Darwinia and Multiwinia were released together as Darwinia+ for the Xbox 360 in 2010.

== Plot ==
Darwinia was created as a digital theme world for artificially intelligent polygons by Dr. Sepulveda. Housed in a massive network of surplus Protologic 68000 machines from the 1980s, Darwinia is a world where the single-poly Darwinians, with their simple, but growing AI, can grow and evolve. Darwinia is also where the world can visit to see them frolicking in their natural, fractal habitat. A Darwinian lives a life working and growing, until the eventual death of the Darwinian, which releases their digital soul to later be reincarnated.

However, the player arrives in the midst of an emergency. Darwinia has been infected by a computer virus, and Sepulveda is in near panic, watching decades of research being corrupted and being used up. Sepulveda enlists the player, a curious hacker who stumbled across Darwinia by accident, to aid him in rescuing the Darwinians and drive off the computer virus. The player is given access to the combat programs, simple tools that originally began as mini-games. These are now the only means of attack against the virus. As the player progresses, it soon becomes clear this is not enough, and that triggers the third aspect of the gameplay, which is evolution.

The first two levels of the video game act as an introduction and allow the player to familiarize themselves with the controls. After that, Dr. Sepulveda begins assigning tasks that span several levels to achieve a long-term objective. The first task involves clearing the virus population from and reactivating the Mines and Power Generator to provide resources for the Construction Yard. Once done, the Yard begins producing armoured units, allowing the player to move on. The next task involves the reincarnation of Darwinians: the Soul Repository in the centre of Darwinia collects the floating souls, and sends them down to the Receiver, where the Darwinians gather them and send them to the Pattern Buffer to be reprogrammed with the main Darwinian blueprint code, where they are sent to the Biosphere to be reborn. The player must clear the Viruses from all the facilities and reactivate them.

In the final level of the game, Sepulveda traces the Viral infection back to its source, which is e-mail spam. After Sepulveda had accidentally flashed an image of his face across the skies of Darwinia, The Darwinians had assumed him to be God. They then re-aligned a portal inside Darwinia in an attempt to communicate with God. The Darwinians managed to access Sepulveda's computer, downloading several files and eventually downloading the Spam. The e-mails were infected with a very nasty strain of internet virus which corrupted the Darwinians. The player is tasked to destroying the few remaining e-mails.

== Gameplay ==
A Squad attacking its target with an airstrike

Darwinia mixes elements from strategy, action, puzzle, hacker and God games alike, meaning that it does not fall under a specific video game genre. The player has the ability to run several programs through the Task Manager, similar to units used in many real-time strategy games. Research allows the player to upgrade programs and weapons, which is critical as the enemy develops. Mission objectives are given at each location/level, as the player and the Darwinians attempt to wipe out the Viruses.

== Development ==
Darwinia was inspired by the theme of the first Indie Game Jam, where a group of programmers experimented with generating tens of thousands of sprites on screen at once. Introversion began prototyping a war game with more units on screen than had ever been done at that point. After months of iteration and development, this coalesced into the gameplay for Darwinia.

The initial beta testing of Darwinia began on 27 August 2004, and the beta testing of the full game started on 26 November, the same year. A demo level of Darwinia was released 3 months later on 21 January, and can be downloaded from the Darwinia website. Darwinia was released in Europe on 4 March 2005 (the U.S. version followed on 12 June 2006), while the Macintosh version was released 30 March 2005 by publisher Ambrosia Software. A patch was released on 28 April 2005 for Microsoft Windows, bringing the version to 1.2. New features included an improved unit selection system, as well as numerous modding updates including the ability to create custom strings. Another patch (version 1.3) was released in September 2005, which includes the option (enabled by default) of clicking icons or using keyboard shortcuts to create units instead of using the gesture system. A new demo, using features of the above-mentioned version 1.3 patch and an entirely new level "Launchpad" not in the full game, was released in September 2005.

Darwinia was released on Steam on 14 December 2005. This helped solve some of Introversion's distribution problems, and allowed for localized versions to be developed; a German translation was included with the Steam release. A new patch was released on 10 March 2006 bringing the version up to 1.42 and adding difficulty settings ranging from 1 to 10. Higher difficulties increase the number, speed, and health of monsters. It also increases the speed of the player's own units. eGames-owned Cinemaware on 4 April 2006 issued a press release announcing they would bring Darwinia to US markets in June 2006. Beta testing signups for version 1.5.x started on 15 December 2006. A Windows Vista exclusive version of Darwinia with extra eye candy and 3 additional levels was released on 31 January 2007. Version 1.5.1.1 patch released on 18 June 2007, providing support for DirectX 9c, including extra eye candy and the "Launchpad" level.

In 2010 in context of a Bundle sale the source code of the game was made available for purchase under a non-open-source license.

On April 18, 2022, the remastered version of Darwinia was released via an update for Steam and GOG releases to celebrate its "10000th anniversary". The remaster includes updated graphics, numerous bugfixes, support of surround sound up to 7.1 and the Steam integration, native support of Steam Deck included.

== Darwinia+ ==
Darwinia+ is the version of Darwinia for the Xbox 360, released on the Xbox Live Arcade on 11 February 2010. It includes updated versions of both Darwinia and Multiwinia. This was Introversion Software's first venture onto a video game console.

== Reception ==
Reception

Aggregate score
| Aggregator | Score | |
| Aggregator | PC | Xbox 360 |
|---|---|---|
| Metacritic | 84/100 | 80/100 |

Review scores
| Publication | Score | |
| Publication | PC | Xbox 360 |
|---|---|---|
| Computer Gaming World | 4.5/5 | N/A |
| Edge | 7/10 | 8/10 |
| Eurogamer | 9/10 | 8/10 |
| Game Informer | 7.5/10 | N/A |
| GameRevolution | C+ | A− |
| GameSpot | 8.5/10 | 8/10 |
| GameZone | 9/10 | N/A |
| IGN | 8.8/10 | 8.9/10 |
| Official Xbox Magazine (US) | N/A | 7.5/10 |
| PC Gamer (US) | 82% | N/A |
| 411Mania | N/A | 9/10 |
| The A.V. Club | A− | N/A |

Awards
| Publication | Award |
|---|---|
| Independent Games Festival | Seumas McNally Grand Prize |
| Independent Games Festival | Technical Excellence |
| Independent Games Festival | Innovation in Visual Art |

Darwinia and Darwinia+ were positively received by critics, garnering "generally favorable reviews" according to Metacritic. The PC version won the Seumas McNally Grand Prize at IGF 2006, as well as the Technical Excellence and Innovation in Visual Art awards. New Age Gaming magazine awarded the game a score of 97, its highest ever as of June 2007, and an Editor's Choice award. It scored 90% from PC Gamer UK and reached number 21 on its 'Top 100 PC Games' list. PC Review described it as "one game that simply has to be played".

=== Awards ===
Darwinia won PC Gamer US's 2005 "Special Achievement in Creativity" award. The editors wrote, "Part RTS game, part sandbox, part Sea Monkeys — Darwinia's retro-cool is backed up with intense and often surprising strategic moments." It was nominated for Best Game in the GameShadow Innovation in Games Awards 2006 and listed in 1001 Video Games You Must Play Before You Die.
