= Dwarf Fortress =

2006 management simulation game

- Developer: Bay 12 Games
- Publishers: Bay 12 Games; Kitfox Games (Steam, Itch.io)
- Designers: Tarn Adams; Zach Adams
- Platforms: Windows, Linux (Note: Older versions of the game also supported macOS. This support was dropped when the premium version released on Steam. The last version to support macOS was v0.47.05.)
- Release: Public Alpha (v0.21.93.19a); August 8, 2006; 20 years ago; Steam, Itch.io; December 6, 2022; 3 years ago
- Genres: Construction and management simulation, roguelike, survival
- Mode: Single-player

Dwarf Fortress (previously titled Slaves to Armok: God of Blood Chapter II: Dwarf Fortress) is a construction and management simulation and roguelike indie video game created by Bay 12 Games. Available as freeware and in development since 2002, its first alpha version was released in 2006 and received attention for being a two-member project surviving solely on donations.

Originally displayed using ASCII arts, the game is set in a detailed, procedurally generated fantasy world with randomized creatures, NPCs, and history. Players can control a colony of dwarves in a fortress or explore the world as a player character. Its mechanics have been lauded for their depth and complexity.

Prior to Dwarf Fortress, Tarn Adams was working on a project called Slaves to Armok: God of Blood which was a role-playing game. By 2004, Adams decided to shift from the original Armok to Dwarf Fortress after the former became difficult to maintain. Adams calls it his life's work and said in 2011 that version 1.0 will not be ready for at least another 20 years, and even after that he would continue to work on it. A paid edition with graphical tiles and a new soundtrack was published by Kitfox Games and released to Steam and Itch.io in 2022.

Critics praised its complex and emergent gameplay but had mixed reactions to its difficulty and learning curve. The game influenced Minecraft, RimWorld, and others, and was selected among other games to be featured in the Museum of Modern Art to show the history of video gaming in 2012. The game has a cult following and an active online community. As there are no win conditions, every fortress, no matter how successful, will eventually fall; this has prompted the community motto: "Losing is Fun!"

== Gameplay ==
=== Overview and game modes ===
The game uses text symbols for graphics, unless modified. For example, a dwarf is a colored, bearded smiley-like character and various other letters represent animals. Here, dwarves and livestock can be seen around their wagon of supplies just after embark.

Dwarf Fortress has three primary game modes which take place in worlds created by the player, where most of the elements are randomly generated.

- Fortress mode, a construction and management simulation of a colony of dwarves. There are no objectives, with the player being free to decide how to go about managing the colony and making them interact with the environment, thus making it an open-ended and sandbox-style game. Since there is no way to win, it only ends when the entire colony is defeated by the various possible threats, or the player decides to abandon or retire the fortress.
- Adventure mode, a turn-based, open-ended roguelike where the player starts off as an adventurer.
- Legends mode, in which players can view maps, histories of each civilization and any figure who has lived or died in the generated world. Any notable achievement made by the player in any of the two game modes is recorded and is viewable in Legends mode.
- An object testing arena is present, where players can simulate battles between selected units in various conditions. It is also used for testing mods.

The world is represented by letters, numbers, box-drawing characters and symbols in sixteen different colors. For example, a dwarf is represented by the character ☺, a cat is a dark gray c, a dog is a brown d, and a giant spider is a light gray S. The tile-based graphics use code page 437 characters as tiles, giving it the appearance of a text-based game. The paid edition replaces the characters with pixel art sprites and includes an option to switch between the new and old visuals in the settings menu.

=== World generation ===
A world being generated and the years being counted. Each game is played in such generated worlds.

The first step in Dwarf Fortress is generating a playable world; only one game can be played per world at a time. The player can adjust certain parameters governing size, savagery, mineral occurrences and the length of history. The map shows symbols representing roads, hills, towns and cities of the various civilizations, and it changes as the generation progresses.

The process involves procedurally generated basic elements like elevation, rainfall, mineral distribution, drainage and temperature. For example, a high-rainfall and low-drainage area would make a swamp. Areas are thus categorized into biomes, which also have two variables: savagery and alignment. They have their own specific type of plant and animal populations. The next phase is erosion—which the drainage simulates. Rivers are created by tracing their paths from the mountains (which get eroded) to their ends which are usually oceans, though some form lakes. The salinity field defines oceans, mangroves or alluvial plains. Names are generated for the biomes and rivers. The names depend on the area's good/evil variable (the alignment) and though in English, they are originally in one of the four in-game languages of dwarves, elves, humans and goblins; these are the four main races in any generated world.

After a few minutes, the world is populated and its history develops for the number of in-game years selected in the history parameter. Civilizations, races and religions spread and wars occur, with the "population" and "deaths" counters increasing. The ticker stops at the designated "years" value, at which point the world can be saved for use in any game mode. Should the player choose to retire a fortress or adventure mode character, or should they be defeated, this world will persist and will become available for further games.

=== Fortress mode ===
==== Basics ====
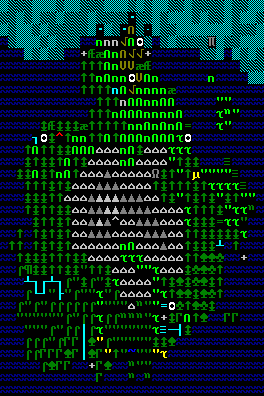
A Dwarf Fortress world map

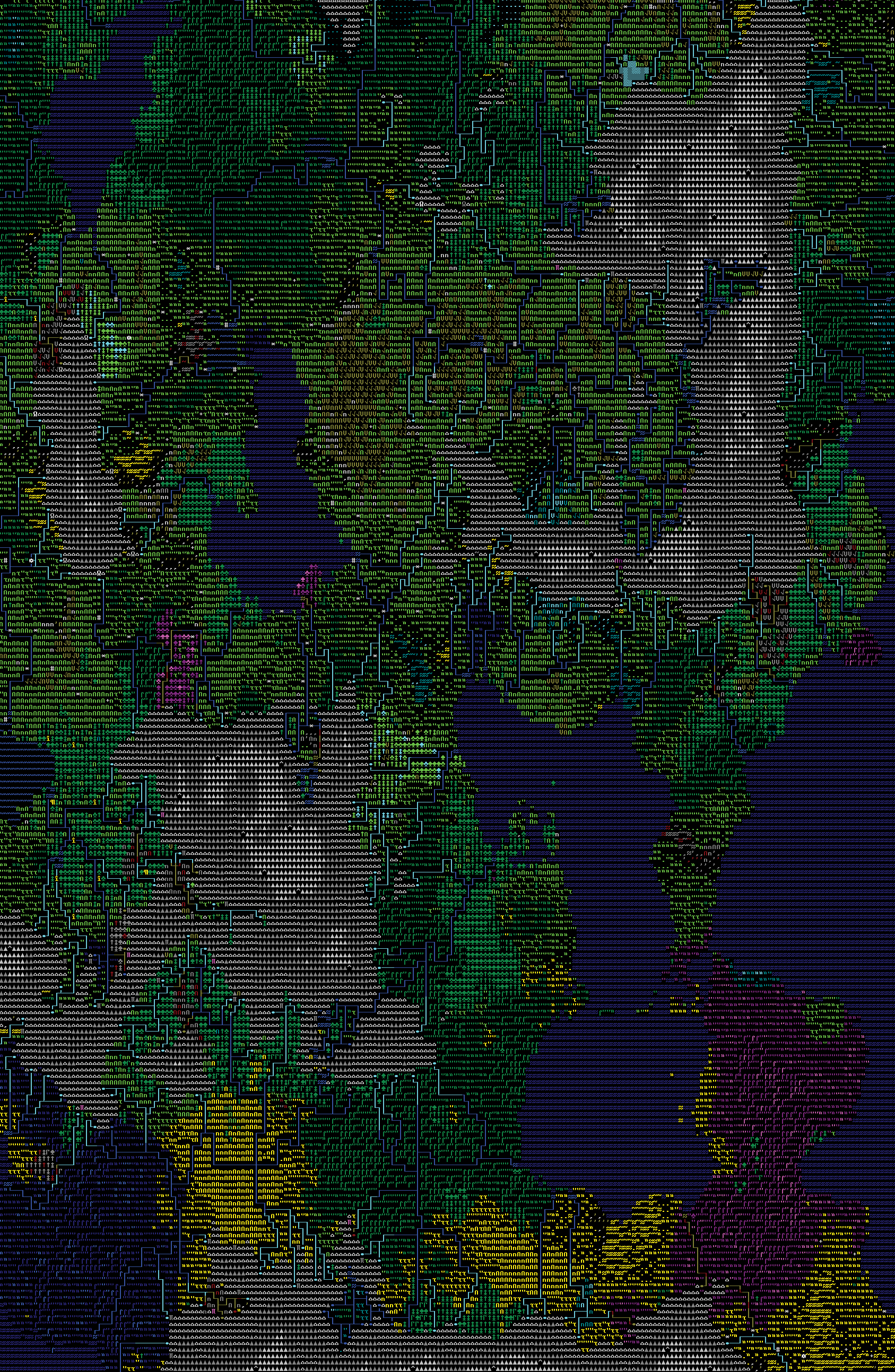
Excerpt of Dwarf Fortress world map by Aaron A. Reed for the 50 Years of Text Games project

When Fortress mode is selected, the player is given the option to choose the embark location in the world. The player can consider the environment, elevations, biome, soil types and mineral concentrations which can pose significant challenges to the development or survival of the fortress. Customizing the colony's supplies, domestic animals and skills are available, but each dwarf's mental and physical attributes are randomly generated. The game describes in detail each dwarf's physical appearance, like hair and facial features. The mental abilities, individual preferences and desires are also randomly generated. Each dwarf's relationships with others and the deities they worship can be viewed.

The player embarks with the expedition team (seven dwarves, their livestock and supplies), and does not have direct control over them. In order to construct and operate the fortress, the player has to designate specific tasks to be performed and the dwarves will go about it. They can be assigned any labors, but their work still depends on their relative skill with it, which can increase as they perform said task. Some task categories are stone-working, woodworking, metalworking, farming, and crafting; there are further combat-related skills. They are categorized further, such as leatherworking, butchery, clothesmaking, gem cutting, glassmaking, and pottery. Activities take place in workshops which need to be constructed; for example, stills for brewing alcohol. The metal industry has a very important role because it produces weapons and armor for the military, trap components for defense, and high-value furniture and decorations.

==== Functional mechanics ====
The player initially can see a top-down view of the surface-level of the fortress site; each layer of a z-axis level can be viewed when the player changes it. An entire underground level would be seen as its entire section of terrain while a mountain at the surface level would have only its section visible with the remaining surface landscape. Thus, for digging, the player can designate, for every z-level starting from the surface, staircases to be carved, and, at the final designated level, end the staircase by having it dug into a room.

The geology in Dwarf Fortress is fairly accurate. Rocks like olivine and gabbro can be dug up. The topmost layer usually consists of sand, clay or plain soil—this can be used for underground farming. Deeper levels will be layers of rock; minerals appear in layers or clusters around the right depth. Gems like tourmalines appear in rare clusters. Water is simulated like falling sand; every tile can contain up to seven levels of it. A tile having one level of water is the lowest, while a tile with seven is full. There is a system for simulating temperature and heat. Fires can spread and burn dwarves and furniture. There are four basic seasons in an in-game year: spring, summer, autumn and winter.

Mineral ores can be mined just like normal stone and the raw ore can be smelted to produce their corresponding metal bars. Different ores or metal bars can be alloyed together for higher quality materials. For steel production, flux stones are used to make pig iron bars and smelt it with regular iron and coke (or charcoal). Specific metal items can be melted back to their respective bars. Without steel, the alloy bronze or regular iron are the next best suitable metals to use. Bronze requires two ores or bars of tin and copper. The metal adamantine, found deep below, is extremely light but very strong, making it excellent for sharp weapons and armor. Raw adamantine can be extracted into strands and can further be either woven in cloth or smelted into wafers.

==== Fortress management and growth ====
Underground farming has customized crops like "plump helmet" mushrooms, which can be brewed to make dwarven wine. As the fortress prospers, migrants come in larger numbers from the mountainhome (the colony's home civilization) and will need further accommodation. Trading caravans, which can be from the various neighboring civilizations including the home civilization, visit the fortress on a yearly basis and are useful for getting supplies not available in the player's fortress area. The role of bookkeeper, manager and broker can be assigned to any dwarf during early game. The bookkeeper maintains records of every item present in the fort, the manager auto-assigns jobs and the broker deals with trading caravans. The production of crafts from any material are useful for trading. The caravans come from civilizations of elves and humans but depending on the embark region and history, they may be absent or sometimes even hostile.

Dwarves need to be provided with food and drink (mostly in the form of alcohol). A dwarf will get negative thoughts for drinking plain water and even for drinking the same type of alcohol, making it necessary to grow different crops for producing different drinks. Things like not having a separate bedroom can upset a dwarf. They may make friends and sometimes marry; females give birth. Dwarves can get upset by sustaining injuries, having poor clothing, losing their pets, friends or relatives; interacting with or seeing their corpses can aggravate this. A frustrated dwarf may break furniture or attack others. Continuous stress will cause them to throw tantrums and eventually go insane, whether going berserk and attacking their comrades in a homicidal rage, becoming suicidally depressed and jumping off a cliff, or simply going "stark raving mad" and stumbling around randomly until their untimely death. Their quality of life can be improved by giving them luxurious personal bedrooms and a well-decorated dining room, medical care, and providing them with a variety of drinks and well-cooked meals. A chain reaction where a single dwarf's unhappiness causes the entire fortress's population to start throwing tantrums can begin when one dwarf throws a tantrum, attacks and kills another one with many friends, which drastically affects the happiness of many more.

As the fortress expands and develops, new noble positions become available. While regular dwarves will be happy with simple rooms provided to them, dwarves appointed or elected to noble positions will need more luxurious accommodation. Nobles will even make demands and mandates, getting negative thoughts if they are not fulfilled. A justice system is present to punish criminals, such as dwarves who injure or kill another dwarf or destroy furniture. Occasionally, a vampire dwarf, with a false background history, may arrive with a migrant wave and start killing and feeding on the other citizens without being noticed.

Inspired dwarves will occasionally get into a "Strange Mood". They will take over a workshop and go searching for the required materials to begin construction of an artifact. If they cannot find the materials, the dwarf will wait at the workshop, demanding it until it is available. After a few in-game weeks, the work results in a legendary artifact, an item so masterfully crafted that it is usually worth more than a beginning fortress' total wealth put together. These artifacts will be added to the world's records and its exact description can be viewed. Through this entire period of being in a strange mood, a dwarf will not eat, drink or sleep and will eventually go insane if they are unable to complete the artifact due to any reason (such as unavailability of materials).

==== Threats, defense and delving deeper ====
The first in-game year will usually consist of kobold thieves and goblin snatchers trying to infiltrate the fortress. Thieves try to steal valuables, while snatchers try to kidnap dwarven children to raise them as future soldiers. Goblin and kobold civilizations near the fortress will always be hostile and a source of frequent attacks. Wildlife is usually harmless, but depending on the fortress' location, more fierce elephants, bears, unicorns, giant spiders and wolves may be a threat. Wealthier and more populated fortresses will get ambushes and sieges from neighboring goblin (or other enemy) civilizations. A thriving fortress will attract certain "megabeasts" like hydras, titans or dragons, and randomly generated creatures called "Forgotten Beasts". These unique creatures have randomized physical qualities and abilities, thus giving them the potential to be very powerful. Undead attack mainly in evil biomes or if the player embarks near a necromancer's tower. Undead are harder to kill, and often reanimate once they are defeated, with their body parts being separate units to fight.

Military squads can be assigned to barracks to train and be equipped with a uniform (armor and a weapon). Squads can be directly commanded to attack enemies. Crossbows can be made for ranged attacks, and a shooting range with targets can be constructed for training. Walls can be carved into fortifications and be used by ranged-units during attacks. Training areas can be made to train war animals, such as dogs. Players can use traps and engineering in addition to training an army. Traps can be made by constructing mechanisms and using metal or wood to construct large weapons like spikes, axe blades or cages. More complex lever-operated and pressure plate-triggering trap components are available.

Combat messages being displayed during Adventurer mode. Each message describes weapons striking specific parts of the combatants' bodies with organs getting pierced or limbs getting severed.

The combat system in Dwarf Fortress is anatomically detailed. Combat is displayed by viewing the log which describes each weapon striking a specific part of the character's body. Internal organs can get punctured, combatants can fall to the ground, vomit, and lose body parts. Each dwarf has individually detailed limbs, each with damageable bone, fat, nerves, muscle and skin. Fat can be bruised without breaking bones and vice versa. Injuries sometimes can be permanent. There is a medical system where a hospital can be set up, where crutches for disabled dwarves, traction benches, plasters and cloth for casts and bandages, thread for suturing, soap for preventing infection, and splints can be provided to help with the healing process.

Digging deeper is usually done for finding magma, which, as a fuel source, removes the player's dependence on coal or wood. Another reason to dig deeper is for searching for specific raw materials, ores or gems. Magma pools or the even bigger, world-spanning, magma sea are found while digging into warm rock. Near the magma sea, raw adamantine strata can be found. They are shaped like columns, which pass down through the entire magma sea. These columns are hollow and can be broken, revealing an entire shaft leading deeper into the underworld or hell. Underworld creatures are countless and nearly always bring a fortress to ruin.

=== Adventurer mode ===
Adventurer is the secondary game mode in Dwarf Fortress. Unlike Fortress mode, Adventurer mode has the player control a single character. In Adventurer mode, character creation works similar to other role-playing games, with the player choosing the name, gender, race and personality of the character. Players also select from a choice of various skills and attributes, such as strength and agility. Like in Fortress mode, these skills further improve normally through exercised use unlike regular experience. They play in the same generated worlds, and these worlds continue to develop and advance while time passes as in Fortress mode. The character starts off in a town of their choosing, depending on the character's chosen civilization, and can interact with the various non-playable characters (NPCs). NPCs can speak about the surrounding areas or offer to follow and help the player. Quests are given via a "rumor" system, where rumors can spread among the NPCs, or players can decide to serve a leader and attain more traditional quests from them via an "Agreement". Characters can also write poems, books and music compositions, based on procedurally generated forms and styles. The player can choose to form a site and build using materials they collect. Players can use the quick travel mode to quickly travel between geographical regions.

Like regular characters in Fortress mode, characters have thirst, hunger and exhaustion levels. To survive, they must eat, drink and sleep. They need to take shelter at night when evil creatures like bogeymen come out. In addition to the regular combat mechanism, in this mode, the player can also choose which body parts to strike. A player can visit their retired or ruined fortresses made in Fortress mode. Instead of quitting, the character can be retired, and depending on the player's achievements, their life events will be documented in the Legends mode among the historical figures.

=== Legends mode ===
Legends is the third way of interacting with a generated world, a listing of the events of historical figures, sites such as towns or fortresses, regions and civilizations. Legends also includes a "historical map" tool in which players can examine conflicts and other activities between civilizations. These generally take the form of sentences describing the actions of the characters, as well as notable completed events. Some historical entries also include notable kills, megabeasts, and allies and enemies within the game world. The character referenced in these details generally have their own historical entries alongside.

At any time, the player can create an XML dump in which players can examine history outside of the game. Similarly, players can export detailed maps that show world details such as biome boundaries, rainfall and drainage. These XML files and map images can be used in third-party software to view the generated world and its history in a more user-friendly and comprehensive interface.

== History ==
=== Early development (2002–2006) ===
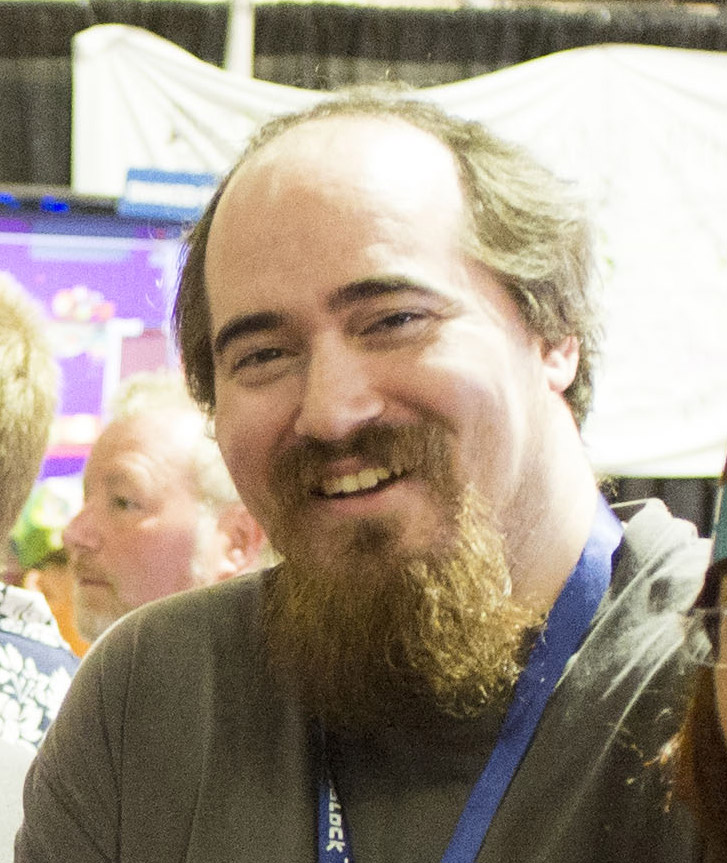
Tarn Adams in 2013; he has been designing games since high school.

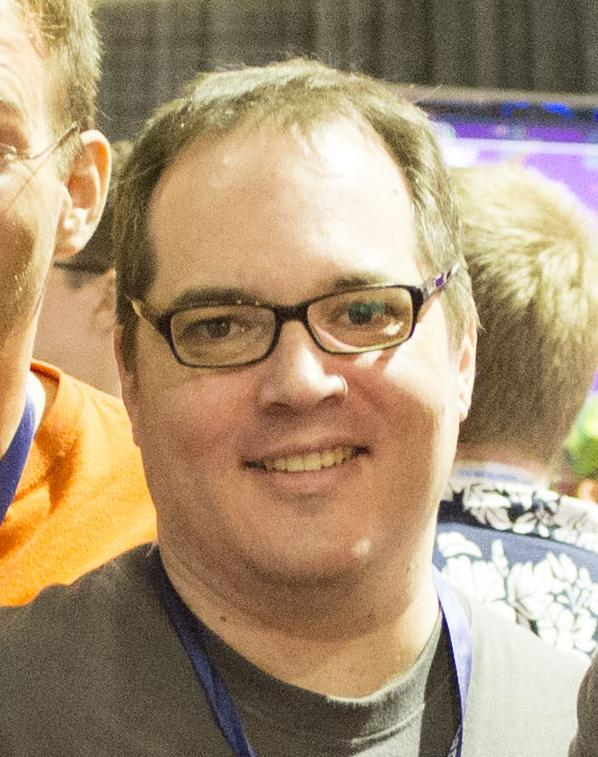
His older brother, Zach, who helped him with his game projects and Dwarf Fortress

One of Tarn and Zach Adams' early works was a text based adventure game called dragslay, written in the BASIC language and influenced by Dungeons & Dragons. This was the brothers' first fantasy project. In high school, Tarn Adams taught himself the C programming language and developed it further. dragslay would later have an important influence on Dwarf Fortress. Adams explained his interest in fantasy games, that he had grown up "surrounded by that sort of thing ... along with generic sci-fi, generic fantasy is part of our heritage." Years later, before entering graduate school in mathematics, Adams began working on a project he called Slaves to Armok: God of Blood. It was named after a deity in dragslay, originally named for a variable "arm_ok"—which counted the limbs the player still had attached. This new project was a two-dimensional (later to have 3D graphics) isometric fantasy role-playing game in which the player encountered and fought goblins.

Adams took some time off Armok to work on small side-projects, and another one which would inspire Dwarf Fortress was Mutant Miner. It was turn-based, loosely inspired by a game called Miner VGA. Mutant Miner involved the player digging underneath buildings, searching for ores, fighting monsters, and carrying radioactive "goo" back to the surface to grow extra limbs and gain other abilities. Adams was dissatisfied with only having a single miner, and the game began to lag because it was turn-based. Adams said:

[I]nstead of rewriting the game, I thought, well maybe it should be dwarves instead. And it should be real-time to combat the [lag] problem. Now, you'd be digging out minerals in a mountain, combating threats inside, and making little workshops. Then I thought, well, how should the high score list work? We really like to keep records of plays. Not just high score lists, but expansive logs. So we'll often try to think of ways to play with the idea. This time, the idea was to let your adventurer come into the fortress after you lose and find the goblets you've made, and journals it generates.

=== First release (2006) ===
Adams began working on Dwarf Fortress in October 2002, estimating that the project would take two months, but suspended development soon after, in order to finish his previous work, Armok. He explained that it began like the 1982 arcade game Dig Dug. The Adams brothers started the Bay 12 Games company, launching its website and releasing their games online. Armok became harder to maintain due to him focusing on adding features to Dwarf Fortress instead, in addition to its inferior code and 3D graphics. By 2004, Adams announced on his website that he would be switching his main project to Dwarf Fortress after he struggled to continue working on it. Adams explained that it would be a simulation game with dwarves but kept Adventurer mode as a surprise feature, which was revealed during its release. At that time, his fan base consisted of a few dozen people and more came in when he made this announcement. He put up a PayPal button after a request from a fan; similarly, a subscriber system was added later. In the next five months, they made around $300, which brought in only enough to cover the site's $20 hosting cost. He dubbed the game Slaves to Armok, God of Blood II: Dwarf Fortress; Adams explained that it was a sequel because it continued to work toward many of Armok's development goals but said its cumbersome name was mostly "for kicks".

Adams decided to focus on the game's development full-time during his first year of his math post-doctorate at Texas A&M in 2006. The university offered him $50,000 if he would stay another year. Adams agreed and commented on this, "I woke up the morning after I gave notice, like, I can actually make this work." Later, Adams expected he would use his $15,000 savings for a year and then have to get a job in order to support himself because the game had not been released yet. Development continued until August 8, 2006, when the first alpha version (version 0.21.93.19a) was released. Donations reached $800–1,000 in the following months, an average that increased gradually until they were financially stable. He then decided to solely rely on donations.

=== Development (2007–present) ===
According to Adams, Dwarf Fortress is written in an "unsanctioned messy combination" of C and C++ using a free edition of Microsoft Visual Studio as the IDE. Adams did not use the 3D graphics which Armok had since its development was hampered because of it. He cited the ease in development of features like fluid simulation, copyright issues with the art and more unhindered possibilities as further reasons for not using it. Being used to the text-based graphics in roguelikes, he did not want graphical tilesets. The story-generation originated first from Armok, although present to some extent in dragslay. Tarn and Zach would write different chapters of events they would like to see, mix it together and try to implement it. Most of this story writing is managed by Zach, who has a role in the game's development; he graduated in ancient history, and books like The Twelve Caesars and the writings of Assyrian kings influenced the game.

Hack, Starflight and the Ultima series were Adams' main influences. The 1985 roguelike Hack inspired Adams because of its randomly generated levels, deceased character persistence and detailed mechanics. Adams cited Ultima series as the inspiration for his generated worlds. The body part and wound system was inspired by 1990 role-playing game Cyberpunk 2020. He prefers modeling on individual elements, rather than entire systems, for better simulations with the outcomes being under his control. He said midpoint displacement generates the elevation of the world and its initial basic elements use fractals, which give it an overall natural look. He further explained that he made an algorithm to simulate rain shadows which occur in areas at the side of mountain deserts. For the distinct personalities of each unit, he took it from NEO PI-R test of which he admitted knowing little about. The feature of carps eating dwarves was unexpected when the game was released. He had written them having the same size and carps were designed to be carnivorous. A tough part of the game for him to implement was the A* search algorithm for in-game character's pathfinding which, depending on their numbers and complexity of the path, can cause a heavy load on a computer. Adams composed the game's flamenco-inspired music.

A z-axis was introduced in the 2007 release because he felt the limitations with a single plane increasing; the feature of making various constructions like walls was also added at this time. In the earlier version, players could dig only into a mountainside and not underground because of having only one "z-level", thus it was considered "2D". This was significantly easier to maintain due to the limited playable area. Adams commented that this major change was further difficult to implement because of considering details like fluid mechanics and cave-ins. Vampiric and lycanthropic infections with necromancers and undead were added in 2012.

On his reliance on PayPal donations, Adams says he is content since he feels that people enjoy his work or they would not pay. Adams said that donations remain stable except during a new version update, where there is a sudden increase. Their expenses being low, he has maintained that he is happy as long as the game is self-sustaining and will not charge for it. In 2011, Adams refused a job offer from an unspecified major game developer and a $300,000 deal to license the name Dwarf Fortress from another company. Adams felt that this amount would not equate to long-term donations and that he prefers working on his own—not being part of the gaming industry. Adams said, "Barely in the black one month, a little in the red another month. ... It's a risk I'm willing to take, and really I couldn't have it any other way." He has spent no money on advertising and was happy when bloggers, reviewers like former game journalist Kieron Gillen from PC Gamer and Games for Windows, wrote about his game. In 2015, Bay 12 Games set up a Patreon account to help fund it.

=== Steam and Itch.io release (2022) ===
In March 2019, the Adams brothers announced they would be releasing a paid edition of Dwarf Fortress, featuring a new graphical tileset and music through Steam and Itch.io, published by Kitfox Games. Adams stated this would not affect the ongoing free version of Dwarf Fortress, but due to family situations at the time and the waning income from Patreon, they wanted to find another way to monetize the game. The Steam edition includes support for Steam Workshop, which allows users to provide modifications to the game. It was released on December 6, 2022.

Kitfox Games enlisted the help of an economist to perform an analysis of the game's projected sales, using the number of wishlists and sales data of games Kitfox had previously published as a reference. The initial estimate was that Dwarf Fortress would sell around 160,000 units within two months, but that goal was exceeded within the first day. The game was the best-selling title on Steam upon release. One Steam user expressed incredulity at the amount of positive reviews the game garnered in such a short amount of time, and took to the Steam forums to ask if people had "been playing free DF for 25 years [sic] and just waiting for an opportunity to pay $30?", to which over 3,000 people replied "Yes".

Shortly after the release, the Adams brothers announced they had brought a third person onto the Dwarf Fortress team, a community member named Putnam, to help with development along with a community manager. In February 2023, they revealed on the Bay 12 forums that revenue from the game in January 2023 was over $7.2 million, an over 400-fold increase from the pre-Steam income of around $15,000 monthly.

=== Further updates ===
As of November 2025, the latest update was version 53.02, with it completing 24 years in development despite being an alpha version. Starting from version 50.01, which released on December 6, 2022, the developers opted for a new versioning scheme without the leading "0." present in all previous versions of Dwarf Fortress. Adams and his brother have a to-do list of features the game should have before version 1.0 and the version number is the percentage progress of its completion. He says he has been able to maintain focus by shifting his attention to different aspects of the game, given its large coverage. While regular game development aim to perfect their work for release, he considers that a drawback since he continues exploring and learning while adding new features. Wired and Rock Paper Shotgun called some of its bug fixes unintentional and funny, with PC Gamer saying it makes an entertaining RSS feed to subscribe to. Adams has two favorite bugs. One is about a farmer dwarf planting his own bed, and the other involves a dwarven executioner, with broken arms, thus unable to use his hammer, delivering punishments by biting his victims and tearing off their limbs, keeping one in his mouth for years.

Adams considers Dwarf Fortress his life's work, and has stated in 2011 that he does not expect version 1.0 to be released for at least another twenty years, and even after that, he would still continue to update it. Adams calls his game an open-ended "story generator". The game's code base is proprietary, and Adams has stated he has no plans to release it into the open-source domain, citing the risk of financial losses. He explained he would consider releasing its source if he could not maintain it anymore, seeing different game developers taking it up. He says that he does not mind any modifications as long as he is not put at financial risk.

Adams describes version 1.0 having an Adventurer mode that would be a regular role-playing game, with changing plots and ordering subordinates to perform various tasks. Fortress mode would have a closer relationship with the outside generated world through war, trade and diplomacy. The world being bigger, he envisions the game to have many more features like magic, a tutorial, and a better interface. According to him, a tutorial is a burden because of the additional need of updating it and interface improvement is not a major priority till then—citing numerous existing fan-made applications for improving the game's interface. He said of version 1.0, "sitting down with a fresh DF world would be like sitting down to read a middling fantasy author you haven't read before, but with all the extras that being a video game provides, including the ability to write your own sequels." Modern in-game technologies and 3D graphics were fan requests Adams said he would never implement, yet showing ambivalence about the latter if the task was easy enough.

== Reception ==
Reception

Aggregate score
Aggregator	Score
Metacritic	93/100

Review scores
Publication	Score
IGN	10/10
PC Gamer (US)	84/100
The Guardian	5/5

The game received attention mainly because of its emergent gameplay, ASCII arts, complexity, poor interface and difficulty. Many reviewers described the game as unusually difficult to learn. It has been compared to other simulation games like SimCity and The Sims, Dungeon Keeper, and roguelike games like NetHack. However, reviewers praised Adams' independence and attention to detail. Gamasutra said, "There have been few indie gaming success stories as big as Dwarf Fortress." Wired magazine, following one of its updates, described it as an "obtuse, wildly ambitious work-in-progress [that] mashes the brutal dungeon crawling of roguelikes with the detail-oriented creativity of city-building sims."

Dwarf Fortress was praised for its depth and complexity. Jonah Weiner from The New York Times stated, "Many simulation games offer players a bag of building blocks, but few dangle a bag as deep, or blocks as small and intricately interlocking, as Dwarf Fortress." PC Gamer's Steve Hogarty commented, "Dwarf Fortress's reluctance to expend even a joule of energy in prettying itself results in astonishing hidden complexity." Regarding the open-ended nature and emergent gameplay, Rock Paper Shotgun's Graham Smith found that with its procedurally generated world and characters simulated "down to the most minute detail", the game's results are "often hilarious, occasionally tragic, and always surprising." Mike Rose from Gamasutra said, "... to an outsider looking in on this game so many years into development, with such a wide scope of features and potential play styles, it's fair to say that getting into Dwarf Fortress is perhaps one of the most daunting tasks the video game industry as a whole can provide."

The lack of graphics, poor interface and controls were seen as the reasons for the game's difficulty. However, the reviewers also noted most of it having a role in gameplay and the argument that the ASCII graphics forces players to use their own imagination, making it more engaging. Weiner wrote, "[the game] may not look real, but once you're hooked, it feels vast, enveloping, alive. A micro-manager's dream, the game gleefully blurs the distinction between painstaking labor and creative thrill." Quintin Smith from Rock, Paper, Shotgun said, "The interface has a tough job to do, bless it, but getting it to do what you want is like teaching a beetle to cook." Ars Technica's Casey Johnston highlighted the difficulty in performing basic actions and felt that tinkering or experimenting ended up being unproductive; she compared it to "trying to build a skyscraper by banging two rocks together". She pointed out the lack of in-game tutorial and said how players can learn by themselves in other games, which are also open-ended or have intuitive mechanics, but in Dwarf Fortress, there is no autonomy "even after hours" of gameplay.

The editors of Computer Games Magazine presented Dwarf Fortress with their 2006 "Best Free Game" award.

In 2016, Dwarf Fortress was ranked as #1 in "The 50 best free PC games" list by PC Gamer. In February 2019, PC Gamer listed Dwarf Fortress as one of the best open world games.

In 2015, Rock Paper Shotgun ranked Dwarf Fortress 7th on its The 50 Best Free Games On PC list. In 2020, Rock Paper Shotgun rated Dwarf Fortress the third best management game on the PC.

In 2023, the Academy of Interactive Arts & Sciences awarded Dwarf Fortress with "Strategy/Simulation Game of the Year" at the 26th Annual D.I.C.E. Awards.

Dwarf Fortress currently has "universal acclaim" on Metacritic, with a score of 93 out of a 100, from 12 reviews. The Steam release sold 160,000 copies within 24 hours of release, and 300,000 copies within its first week. By the end of 2022, they had generated over half a million sales, and over 600,000 copies had been sold by March 2023. Within its first year, Dwarf Fortress sold a total of over 800,000 copies. As of April 2025, Dwarf Fortress has surpassed 1 million copies sold on Steam. In 2026, Bay 12 Games partnered with Wizards of the Coast to produce a Dwarf Fortress Secret Lair which included Dwarf Fortress themed Magic: The Gathering cards.

== Community ==
Dwarf Fortress has attracted a significant cult following. The game's difficulty, with most fortresses eventually succumbing to various forms of defeat, led to its unofficial slogan "Losing is fun!" Adams has said that the slogan was originally a throw-away joke from the game manual, and is meant to create comfort with the concept of permadeath. The slogan 'strike the earth' is used in marketing and community content. Tarn and Zach Adams answer questions from players on the game's official podcast, "Dwarf Fortress Talk". Donors receive personalized crayon drawings or short stories from Tarn Adams, and their names are displayed on a "Champions' List" online. In addition to cash donations, Adams said he has received many in-kind donations. For example, volunteers handle the bug tracking system.

Players and members of the community have often written creative interpretations of game events. They have made diaries, short videos, comics and audio depicting their stories whether it involved success or defeat. Besides testing the game, sharing it with others and supporting it through donations, they make suggestions, help newcomers, share stories, and information in the Bay 12 Games forums. They maintain the dedicated wiki; there are also fan-organized podcasts and meet-ups. In 2006, a saga called Boatmurdered, where fans passed around a single fortress and each played the game and saved it before sending it to another, was portrayed in detail from the start to its destructive end. This spread around gaming sites and boosted the game's popularity. There have been tutorials on YouTube with one being a 15-part series, and another 12-part written series called "The Complete and Utter Newby Tutorial for Dwarf Fortress". An illustrated guide to the game, called Getting Started with Dwarf Fortress: Learn to play the most complex video game ever made was released by technology publisher O'Reilly Media in 2012 written by Peter Tyson. Containing 240 pages, it has a foreword from Adams.

On the game's community, Adams said, "They are the reason I've been able to make the step from hobbyist to full-time developer. I'm lucky to be able to run with whatever ideas we have and try new things." On players sending him forum posts or emails detailing their stories or events that happened during the game, Adams said, "It's really gratifying, because it's one of the things we set out to do is to get people to write these narratives about their game." Adams has admitted that some feats of the community surprised even him. Adams stated that the most impressive thing he had ever seen done with the game was when a player managed to create a Turing-complete 8-bit computer powered by dwarves.

Third-party utilities and mods like "Dwarf Therapist" help players manage toggling labors and skills. The utility "Stonesense", based on the "DFHack" library, can render the game in a 3D isometric view. The "DF to Minecraft" utility allows players to view their Dwarf Fortress maps by converting them into Minecraft structures. Adams has acknowledged the role of the community in supporting development and endorsed third-party tools, visualizers and interface code; indeed, he has said that he admires third-party developers who create tools for Dwarf Fortress in spite of the fact that the game is closed-source.

On June 11, 2016, an event called Dwarfmoot was held at Mox Boarding House in Bellevue, Washington, to celebrate the ten-year anniversary of the game's release. It was organized by video game developer Kinnon Stephens. The Adams brothers attended and though he was unable to attend in person, Richard Garfield, the creator of Magic: The Gathering provided a pre-recorded introduction.

== Legacy ==
The game influenced Minecraft, which reviewers considered a more user-friendly version of Dwarf Fortress. Adams says he is thankful for the Minecraft developers citing Dwarf Fortress because that drew more players to his game.

RimWorld developer Tynan Sylvester said Dwarf Fortress "amazed me because of the stories people wrote from it. I read generated tales like Boatmurdered and Gemclod and was fascinated by how the player and game could work together to create a narrative that actually worked. I wanted to push that even further – and to do it in a way that's approachable, and without falling into some of the design traps that have, in my opinion, marred Dwarf Fortress."

Upon the game's Steam release, many indie game developers came out to praise Dwarf Fortress and cite its influence on their own games, including the developers of Terraria, Caves of Qud, Prison Architect, and Project Zomboid. Homages to Dwarf Fortress appear in World of Warcraft.

In March 2012, the Museum of Modern Art in New York City exhibited Dwarf Fortress among other games selected to depict the history of video gaming. As new updates are made available, the Museum of Modern Art instantly downloads them and archives them in their server. Curator of the exhibition, Paola Antonelli, said she was amazed by the combination of "beautiful aesthetics" and "mind-boggling" complexity in the game. In July 2014, the game won a poll conducted by Turtle Beach as the community's most "Beautiful Game"; games were nominated by fans posting videos, images or text, and a list was compiled by the community which also contained The Legend of Zelda: The Wind Waker, Far Cry 3 and The Last of Us. Jay Ma, one of the developers of FTL: Faster Than Light, commented on its use of ASCII arts, "Part of the reason Dwarf Fortress can include a breadth of mechanics unseen in other games is because complex mechanics are expressed in the most simple of visual forms."

Game designer Craig Ellsworth commended Dwarf Fortress for having a uniquely long "staying power". According to Ellsworth, it will not be replaced by any other more advanced game of its genre: "There is simply no such thing as a flashier Dwarf Fortress, and there can't be, by definition." He predicted that the game's popularity "will reach its apex" at its final release.

=== Use in academia ===
The game has been the subject of several academic papers investigating a range of fields. These include studies on artificial intelligence, computer game landscapes and computer game pedagogy.
