= List of fictional humanoid species in film =

This is a list of fictional humanoid species in film. It is a collection of various notable humanoid species that are featured in film, either live-action or puppetry, but not those primarily shown via animation.

Species	Film	Notes
Gargantuas	War of the Gargantuas	
Gelflings	The Dark Crystal	
Morlocks	The Time Machine (2002)	
Na'vi	Avatar	The Na'vi have blue, striped skin, pointed and mobile ears, large eyes, catlike noses and teeth, tails, and four fingers. While taller than humans, they have narrower proportions. Their bones are reinforced with naturally occurring carbon fiber. The Na'vi also have a distinctive tendril feature protruding from the back of their heads.
Oompa-Loompas	Charlie and the Chocolate Factory	
Selenites	A Trip to the Moon	
Whatnots	The Muppets	
