= List of fictional humanoid species in television =

This is a list of fictional humanoid species in television. It is a collection of various notable humanoid species that are featured in television programs, either live-action shows or puppetry, but not species of animated programs.

Species	Program	Notes
Andorian	Star Trek	A blue-skinned, white-haired species with distinctive antennae, and one of the founding races of the United Federation of Planets.
Bajoran	Star Trek	A humanoid extraterrestrial species native to the planet Bajor. They were first introduced in the 1991 episode "Ensign Ro" of Star Trek: The Next Generation and subsequently also featured in episodes of Star Trek: Deep Space Nine and Star Trek: Voyager. The shows' writers initially depicted the Bajorans as an oppressed people who were often forced to live as refugees, whom they likened to a variety of ethnic groups, with Rick Berman, who helped to originally conceive them, comparing them to "the Kurds, the Palestinians, the Jews in the 1940s, the boat people from Haiti — unfortunately, the homeless and terrorism are problems [of every age]."
Beastman	BNA: Brand New Animal	A race of humans who instantly shapeshift into an anthropomorphic animal under certain conditions, such as being in the shade.
Betazoid	Star Trek	A black-irised race with empathic and telepathic abilities.
Cardassian	Star Trek	A xenophobic and imperialistic reptilian species.
Centauri	Babylon 5	A once-great nation of humanoids, the first extraterrestrials to make contact with humans.
Felis sapien	Red Dwarf	A race that evolved in an abandoned mining freighter from a pregnant housecat smuggled aboard by a crewmember.
Ferengi	Star Trek	A species with large, sensitive ears and an extremely materialistic culture.
Foofa	Yo Gabba Gabba!	A pink flower-fairy with a white cornflower on her head and chest.
Gumby	Gumby	A green clay humanoid character and created and modeled by Art Clokey.
Jaffa (Stargate)	Stargate SG-1	
Kaylar	Star Trek	
Klingon	Star Trek	A race bearing distinctive forehead ridges and living by a martial honour-based culture.
Kromagg	Sliders	
Luxan	Farscape	A declining former mighty nation of soldiers.
Melmacian	ALF (TV series)	
Minbari	Babylon 5	Very advanced humanoids bearing distinctive bone ridges in the back of their bald heads.
Narn	Babylon 5	A race of former vaguely reptilian humanoid conquerors and colonizers, now being conquered themselves.
Ocampa	Star Trek	A short-lived, quickly-aging species with great telepathic potential, living under the care of an advanced being known as the Caretaker after environmental damage to their homeworld caused by the latter.
Orphnoch	Kamen Rider Faiz	
Romulan	Star Trek	An offshoot of the Vulcans who rejected their ideals of logic and emotional control, and developed a separate paranoid isolationist civilisation.
Sontaran	Doctor Who	A warrior race who reproduce exclusively via cloning.
Spiridon	Doctor Who	
Tellarite	Star Trek	A porcine bearded race known for being stubborn and argumentative, and one of the founding races of the Federation.
Time Lord	Doctor Who	An ancient race possessing advanced time travel technology.
Trill	Star Trek	A species who, in some cases, live in symbiosis with an implanted sentient worm-like creature. The long-lived symbionts often take many hosts during their lives, allowing their hosts access to previous hosts' memories.
Visitor	V	A reptilian humanoid who disguises himself to look human but prefers to eat live prey, such as mice.
Vorlon	Babylon 5	An ancient race of beings that may have inspired legends of angels in Earth's prehistory.
Vulcan	Star Trek	A species with distinctive pointed ears and arched eyebrows. Following a destructive period of near-constant war and strife caused by their violent emotions, the Vulcans embraced a philosophy of total logic and emotional control, and eventually became one of the founding races of the Federation.
Weeping Angel	Doctor Who	
Wraith	Stargate Atlantis	
