= Prison Architect =

2015 video game

- Developers: Introversion Software; Double Eleven (2019−present)
- Publishers: Introversion Software (Note: The console versions were published by Double Eleven, while Paradox Interactive published the mobile versions.); Paradox Interactive (2019−present)
- Producer: Mark Morris
- Designer: Chris Delay
- Platforms: Linux; OS X; Windows; PlayStation 4; Xbox 360; Xbox One; iPadOS; Android; Nintendo Switch
- Release: October 6, 2015: Linux, OS X, Windows October 6, 2015 PlayStation 4, Xbox One; NA: June 28, 2016; EU: July 1, 2016; AU: July 5, 2016 Xbox 360 August 2, 2016 iOS, Android May 25, 2017 Nintendo Switch August 20, 2018 PS5 Xbox series X
- Genre: Construction and management simulation
- Modes: Single-player, multiplayer

Prison Architect is a 2015 private prison construction and management simulation video game developed and published by Introversion Software. It was made available as a crowdfunded paid alpha pre-order on September 25, 2012 with updates that were scheduled every three to four weeks until 2023. With over 2,000,000 copies sold, Prison Architect made over US$10.7 million in pre-order sales for the alpha version. Prison Architect was an entrant in the 2012 Independent Games Festival. The game was available on Steam's Early Access program, and was officially released on October 6, 2015.

In 2019, Paradox Interactive acquired the rights to Prison Architect for an undisclosed sum. A sequel, Prison Architect 2, is currently under development.

== Gameplay ==
The game is a top-down 2D, with a partially 3D mode, highly modifiable construction and management simulation, where the player has been hired by the CEO of a for-profit prison company to take control of building and running a prison. The player's role is of both architect and governor with sandbox micromanagement themes, responsible for managing various aspects of the prison, including building facilities, connecting utilities, and managing staff. The player needs to recruit specific staff to unlock some aspects of the game, e.g., information about the prison's finances is unavailable without an accountant.

The player is responsible for the finances of their prison and for meeting the needs of their prisoners, e.g., sanitation. The player is able to implement various reform and labour programmes that reduce the specific prisoner's recidivism rate. The player tells the prisoners what to do indirectly by setting their schedule. The game takes inspiration from Theme Hospital, Dungeon Keeper, and Dwarf Fortress.

The player can allow additional conditions to be applied to their game, such as simulated temperature, gang activities and more extreme weather conditions, to increase the difficulty of the game and to simulate a prison in conditions nearer to reality. Players may opt to build a female prison, which necessitates the construction of nursing and childcare facilities for female inmates that are accompanying an infant. A player's prison is graded by an in-game report according to various factors, including recidivism rate of prisoners that have left the prison, overall happiness and violence levels within the prison.

Prisoners are classed according to five different security levels. Each corresponds to a different temperament and length of sentence, with, on intake, the higher security levels with more difficult reputations and more severe crimes but also awarding extra cashflow. Death Row prisoners arrive with a "clemency" gauge, expressed as a percentage. This percentage can be lowered with successive failed Death Row Appeal sessions. Below a certain percentage, the prisoner can be executed without legal backlash to the facility regardless of the innocence of the prisoner. Should the Death Row prisoner pass an appeal, he may be released from the prison or transferred into the general prison population. There is also a Protective Custody class that players can assign prisoners to.

Players can be "fired" by the CEO by reaching a failure condition, and the player is then prevented from further managing that prison. There are also options for "creative mode" available on prison creation wherein finance can be ignored, research is fully unlocked, and building is instant, among other changes designed to present a freer sandbox experience.

The first "official" non-beta release introduced an expanded story mode as a tutorial as well as an escape mode which casts the player as a prisoner with the goal of escaping, while causing as much trouble as possible.

With the addition of the Psych Ward DLC, players are given the option to house criminally insane prisoners and build relevant facilities to meet their needs, such as padded cells, and hire additional personnel needed to keep them in check, such as orderlies and psychiatrists. Regular prisoners may become criminally insane when they experience excessive punishment or when their needs are not regularly met, such as lack of access to food or sanitation. Following Psych Ward, 10 other DLCs have been released: Going Green, Perfect Storm, Island Bound, Gangs, Second Chances, Future Tech Pack, Jungle Pack, Free for Life, and Cleared for Transfer. Active development was ended with the Sunset update on May 16, 2023 following the announcement of a sequel, Prison Architect 2.

== Development ==
Prison Architect was developed by British video game studio Introversion Software. The game was announced in October 2011, shortly after Introversion postponed the development of their bank heist simulator game Subversion. It was first made available on September 25, 2012, as an Alpha version. It was then crowdfunded with pre-orders, making over US$270,000 in two weeks with close to 8,000 sales. Introversion Software co-founder Mark Morris explained that independent crowd-funding has allowed them to have no time limit on the Alpha version, as well as no fees associated with crowd-funding platforms. As of December 2013, the developers had raised over US$9 million.

Introversion Software announced that a mobile version was in development and the Windows version officially launched on October 6, 2015. In Introversion's alpha 30 video, they confirmed Prison Architect was coming to iOS and Android in October 2015 with the official release. The developers posted a tweet on March 21, 2013, that "I guess Prison Architect won't be coming to iPad then! Your loss Apple", with a link to a Pocket Gamer article. It was later revealed by the developer that the original direct port did not impress Apple. Due to the possibility of Prison Architect not being featured on the iOS App Store's front page, the project was set aside for a while.

The effort to bring Prison Architect to mobile devices was resumed by Paradox Interactive as the publisher and co-developed with Tag Games. The tablet version for iPad and Android was launched on May 25, 2017. Introversion announced on January 20, 2016, that Double Eleven would be bringing the game to Xbox 360, Xbox One and PlayStation 4 platforms. The console versions were released on June 28, 2016. The Xbox edition was released to subscribers to Xbox Live under the Games With Gold program in September 2018.

On June 6, 2017, Double Eleven released a trailer for an expansion pack named Psych Ward on their YouTube channel. Psych Ward was released on Steam on November 21, 2019.

Update 16 was released on September 4, 2018, and introduced multiplayer, allowing up to 8 players to cooperatively build and manage a prison. This was later reduced to 4 players in a December 2018 update.

On May 16, 2023, Paradox Interactive released The Sunset Update, the final update for the game.

== Expansion packs ==
Name	Release date
Psych Ward	21 November 2019
Cleared for Transfer	14 May 2020
Island Bound	11 June 2020
Going Green	28 January 2021
Second Chances	16 June 2021
Perfect Storm	27 January 2022
Gangs	14 June 2022
Undead	11 October 2022
Future Tech Pack	22 November 2022
Jungle Pack	7 February 2023

== Reception ==
Reception

Aggregate score
Aggregator	Score
Metacritic	PC: 83/100; PS4: 80/100; XONE: 75/100; NS: 83/100

Review scores
Publication	Score
GameSpot	7/10
IGN	8.3/10
TouchArcade	5/5

Upon its full release, Prison Architect received positive reviews, scoring 83 out of 100 on review aggregator site Metacritic. IGN awarded it a score of 8.3 out of 10, saying "Prison Architect is one of the most in-depth, satisfying builder games in ages, if you can get past the initiation." On April 7, 2016, Prison Architect won the 2016 BAFTA award in the Persistent Game category. Prison Architect was also nominated for the 2016 BAFTA award in the British Game category, which was won by Batman: Arkham Knight.

As of September 26, 2015, Prison Architect had grossed over $19 million in sales, and over 1.25 million units of the game had been sold. By the end of August 2016 when the final version '2.0' of Prison Architect was released, the number of individual players was given as two million. In June 2019, it was announced that the game had been downloaded over 4 million times across PC, console and mobile.

== Sequel ==
A sequel, Prison Architect 2, was set to be released on September 3, 2024 but has now been delayed indefinitely. Unlike the first game, Prison Architect 2 is fully 3D and allows players to construct prisons over multiple floors. The game will be available on Windows PC, PlayStation 5 and Xbox Series X and Series S and is developed by Kokku and Double Eleven, and published by Paradox Interactive.

== See also ==
- Prison Tycoon
- The Escapists
