= List of fictional extraterrestrial species and races: V =

Name	Source	Type		
Vaadwaur	Star Trek	Humanoids with ridged faces and necks. They once used subspace corridors to establish themselves as imperialist conquerors, but were forced into stasis.		
Vademon	Digimon			
Vampire Planet people	Vampire Idol	Vampire-humanoids		
Vanacancia	Utopia			
Vanryn	The Haunted Stars	Related to Earth people. They once possessed a great interstellar empire, but are now a low-technology people, restricted to their home world Ryn (a planet of Altair).		
Vardians	Tracker			
Varga plants	Doctor Who			
Vardrag	Nexus: The Jupiter Incident			
Vargr	Traveller RPG	Genetically-altered canine stock taken from Terra by the Ancients		
Vasari	Sins of a Solar Empire			
Ventrexians	Final Space	Race of anthropomorphic cats native to the planet Ventrexia similar in stature to humans. War and martial ability are central to Ventrexian culture and history, as they were at war with their rivals the Tryvuulians for over 1000 years.		
Vashta Nerada	Doctor Who	Tiny, swarming creatures found in the shadows; like piranhas or ants, they strip their prey to the bone.		
Vasudans	Descent: FreeSpace – The Great War	Humanoid		
Vauvusar	Renegade Legion	Amphibianoid		
Vaxasaurian	Ben 10	Dinosaur-like aliens from the planet Terradino. Vaxasaurians can change their size to be up to 60 feet tall, gaining features like tail spikes and plates on their back. In the reboot series, Vaxasaurians lack size-changing abilities and wield bony weapons on the ends of their tails, ranging from hammers to spiked maces to swords, which give them the ability to generate shockwaves by slamming their tails.		
Velantians	Lensman books (Galactic Patrol onwards)	Thirty-foot, crocodile-headed, winged pythons with eyes that come out on stalks		
Venek	Farscape	Humanoid		
Venom and Carnage	Marvel Comics			
Venom grubs	Doctor Who			
Verga	Sir Arthur Conan Doyle's The Lost World	Frozen insect-like humanoids with blue skin		
Vervoids	Doctor Who			
Vespid	Warhammer 40,000			
Vhorwed	Schlock Mercenary			
Vidiians	Star Trek	Nomadic humanoids suffering from a species-wide pandemic which forced them to harvest the organs of others.		
Vilani	Traveller RPG			
Vilgax	Ben 10			
Viltrumites	Invincible			
Vinean	Yoko Tsuno	Humanoids with blue skin		
Visitors	South Park	Stereotypical looking aliens with gray skin and tear-shaped heads and eyes. They are genderless.		
Visitors	V			
Vogons	The Hitchhiker's Guide to the Galaxy	Unsightly humanoids, described as "not actually evil, but bad-tempered, bureaucratic, officious and callous". They originate from Vogsphere, where they used surgery rather than natural evolution to achieve their current form. They pilot Vogon Constructor Fleets, which are used to obliterate planets.	Vohaul	Space Quest II
Void Caster	Adventure Time			
Void whales	Void Bastards	Whale-like non-sapient omnivorous species capable of surviving in hard vacuum and large enough to swallow small spacecraft whole.		
Vok	Beast Wars	Mysterious aliens who seem to resemble floating, gaseous skulls; their base of operations (be it a planet or even a whole other dimension) is Nexus Zero. They apparently have some jurisdiction over the stability of time and space and use highly advanced technology, including the Planet-Buster. Some consider them to be an evolved form of the Swarm, "purified" by Optimus Prime with the Matrix.		
Volus	Mass Effect	Ammonia-based humanoid species. Short, round, subject of the Turians.		
Vorc	Farscape	Humanoid		
Vorcarian bloodtracker	Farscape	Humanoid		
Vorcha	Mass Effect	Humanoid species known for adaptability and their short lifespan.		
Vorlons	Babylon 5	True appearance unknown; they wear encounter suits when in the presence of other intelligent life to hide their true forms. Encounter suit appearances vary.		
Vorta	Star Trek	Humanoid		
Vortex life forms	Ecco the Dolphin			
Vortians	Invader Zim	Vortians are characterized by their goat-like physiology (hooves, horns, etc.) The Vortians are a technologically advanced race, providing the Irkens with advanced military technology. The Vortian home world, Vort, was conquered by Invader Larb and is now Irk's top military research prison.		
Vorticon	Commander Keen	Humanoid		
Vortigaunt	Half-Life	Humanoid		
Vortisaurs	Doctor Who audio dramas			
Voth	Star Trek			
Vroarscans	Utopia			
Vrusk	Star Frontiers	Insectoid centauroid		
Vulcans	Star Trek	Humanoid		
Vulkanette	Bullyparade	Humanoid species that is a parody of the Vulcan species and splits into two subspecies, vulgaris and brutalis. The only known member is Mr. Spuck.		
Vullard	Ratchet & Clank			
Vulpimancer	Ben 10	Dog-like aliens which are native to the planet Vulpin, which had been used as a dumping ground for hazardous waste and stands at the edge of the galaxy. Vulpimancers have no eyes (a combination of their pitch dark planet and its toxic environment), but compensate with highly enhanced smell and hearing that they can use to "see" via a 3d map.		
VUX	Star Control			
Vyrium	Conquest: Frontier Wars	Reptilian		
Vyro-Ingo	Star Control 3			
Vy'keen	No Man's Sky	Honorable warriors in the Universe of NMS.		
