= Legacy of Gene Roddenberry =

Impact of American screenwriter and producer

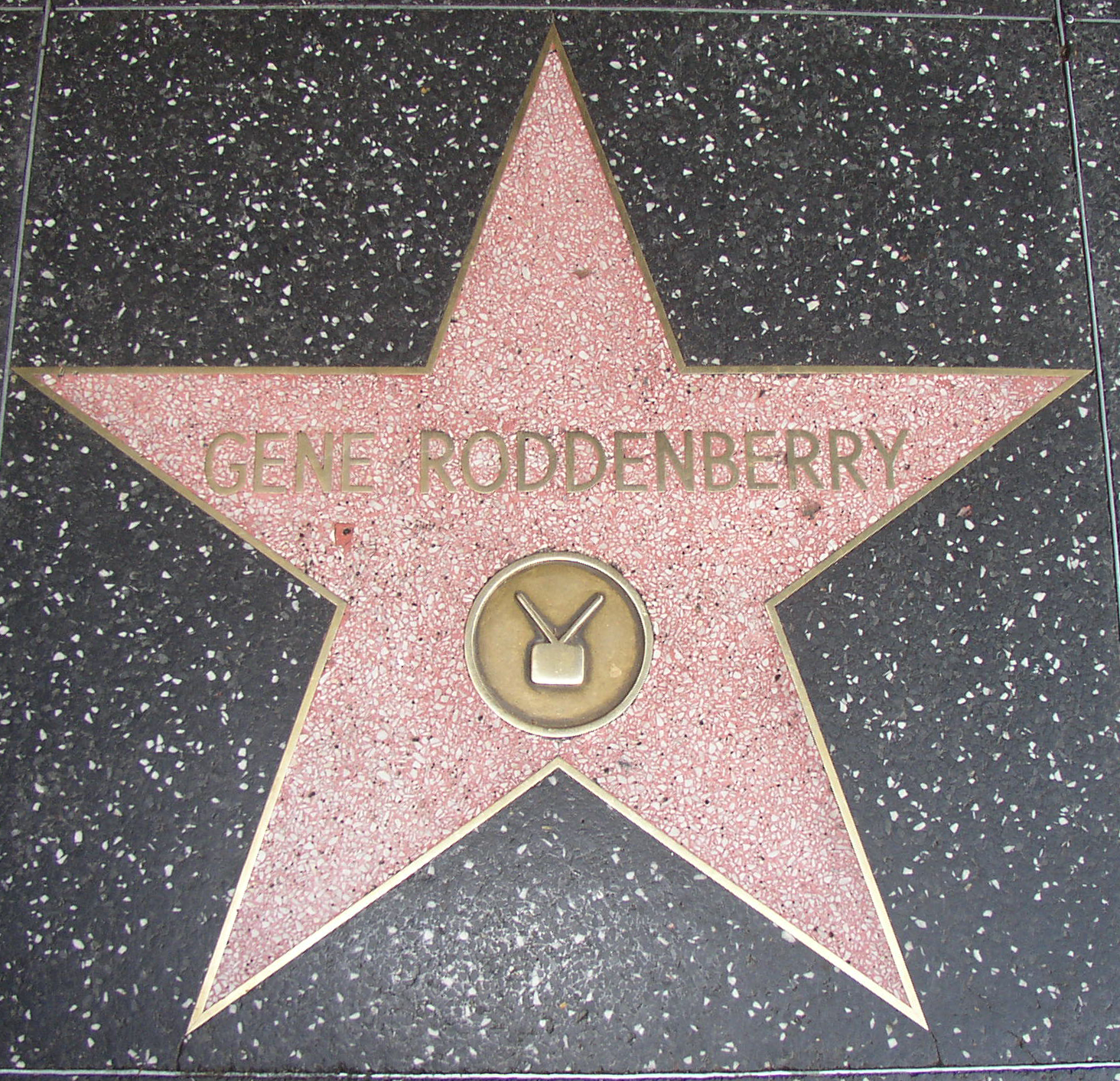
Roddenberry's star on the Hollywood Walk of Fame.

Eugene Wesley "Gene" Roddenberry (August 19, 1921 – October 24, 1991) was an American television screenwriter, producer and futurist best remembered for creating the original Star Trek television series.

== Legacy ==
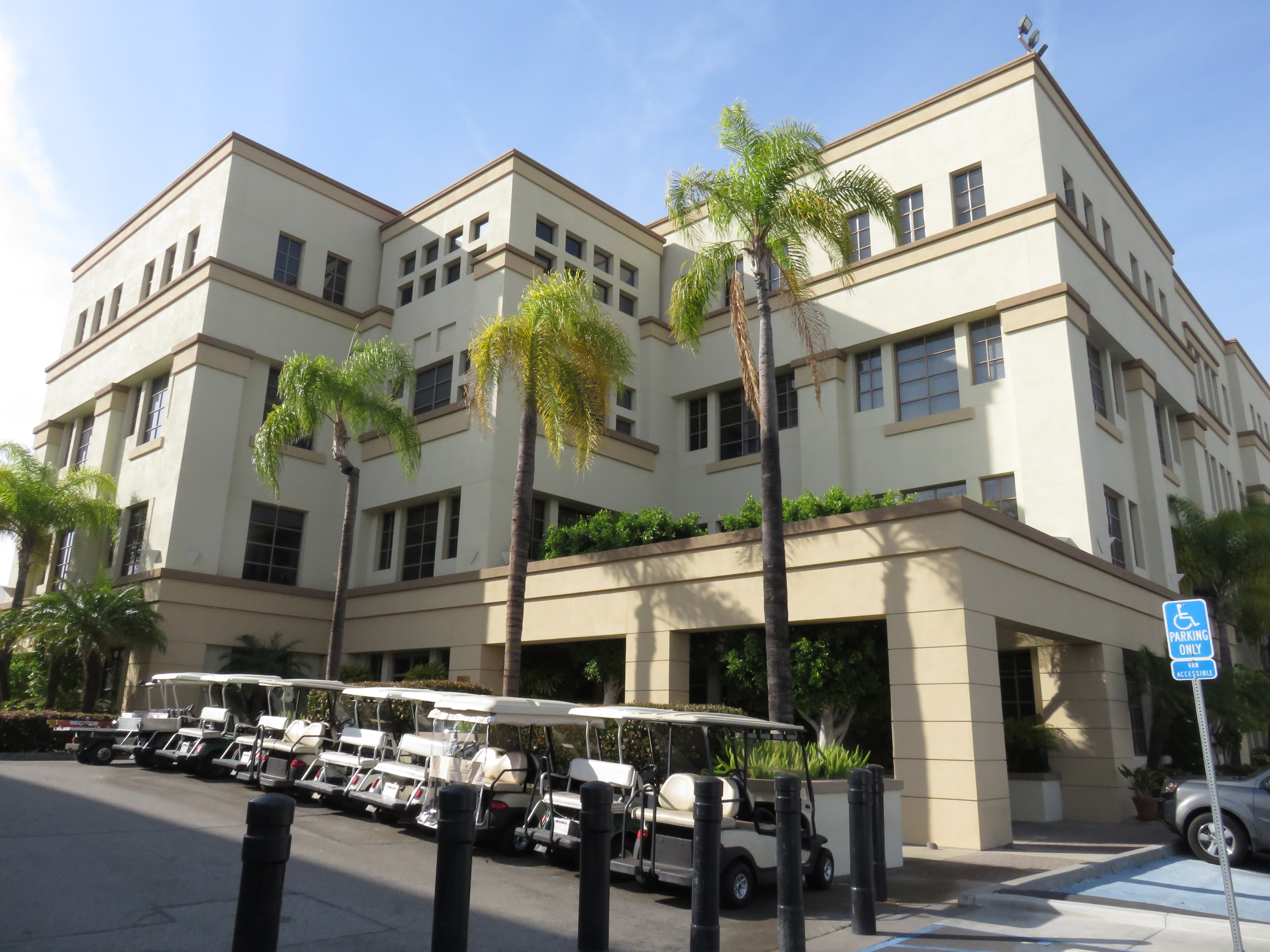
The Roddenberry Building on the Paramount Pictures lot in Hollywood

In 1985, Gene Roddenberry was the first television writer to receive a star on the Hollywood Walk of Fame. He was given a Macintosh 128K by Apple Inc. in 1986, which was later upgraded by the company and re-designated as a Macintosh Plus with the production number of M-0001. This started the rumor that Roddenberry had received the first Mac-Plus off the production line. When the Sci-Fi Channel was launched in the United States eleven months after the death of Roddenberry, the first broadcast was a dedication to two "science fiction pioneers": Isaac Asimov and Roddenberry. His impact on popular culture in the previous thirty years was said to be eclipsed only by that of Elvis Presley. Japanese astrophysicist Yoji Kondo proposed naming a crater on Mars after Roddenberry in 1994. This was supported by Carl Sagan and Arthur C. Clarke, and was agreed to by the International Astronomical Union. The Roddenberry crater is located at Martian latitude −49.9 degrees and longitude 4.5 degrees. He has also had an asteroid named after him, 4659 Roddenberry.

Roddenberry and Star Trek have been cited as inspiration for other science fiction franchises. While being interviewed for Rod Roddenberry's Trek Nation, Star Wars creator George Lucas said: "Star Trek softened up the entertainment arena so that Star Wars could come along and stand on its shoulders." J. Michael Straczynski, comic book writer, and creator of the Babylon 5 franchise, said that he had watched a number of 1960s science fiction series, including Star Trek, noting: "I was fortunate enough to see many of those shows on the occasion of their first broadcasts. But it was only much later, with the passage of time and repetition, that I was able to catch them all to truly appreciate what they had accomplished and what they had to say about who we are, and where we are going." In 2000, the Gene Roddenberry Award was inaugurated at the fifth FantastiCon convention in Los Angeles. It is the highest award handed out by the organization. On its inauguration, it was given to Michael Piller.

After meeting David Alexander at a Star Trek convention in the early 1970s, the duo collaborated on a biography. This was written over the following two decades, with Alexander conducting between 150 and 200 interviews with Roddenberry and others. In total, some fourteen storage boxes of material were collected by Alexander for the production of the book, the only authorized biography of Roddenberry. Titled Star Trek Creator, it was published in 1995. Several other biographies of Roddenberry have also been published, including Joel Engel's Gene Roddenberry: The Myth and the Man Behind Star Trek and James Van Hise's The Man Who Created Star Trek: Gene Roddenberry. Yvonne Fern's book, Gene Roddenberry: The Last Conversation, detailed a series of conversations she had with Roddenberry over the last months on his life.

In October 2002, a plaque was placed at Roddenberry's birthplace in El Paso, Texas. It was paid for from campaign funds by Representative Anthony Cobos, who described El Paso as a "big Trekkie town". He hoped that the plaque would raise awareness of El Paso in Star Trek fandom and increase tourism. The Science Fiction Hall of Fame inducted Roddenberry in 2007 alongside Ridley Scott, Ed Emshwiller, and Gene Wolfe in a ceremony hosted by The Next Generation alumnus Wil Wheaton. Roddenberry was inducted into the Television Academy Hall of Fame in January 2010, with a tribute by Family Guy creator and Star Trek: Enterprise guest star Seth MacFarlane.

Roddenberry stored a large volume of work on floppy disks during the 1970s and early 1980s. Following his death, there remained several boxes of these disks that were unreadable by the computers of that time as they were formatted to be run on the CP/M operating system as well as custom built computers. Roddenberry owned two of those computers, one of which was sold in an estate sale following his death, and the other was non-operational. DriveSavers were contracted by Rod Roddenberry to restore the information on the disks in 2012, and while a few were compatible with MS-DOS, the majority required the company to reverse engineer the format in order to read the disks. In early 2016, it was announced that the restoration efforts had been successful and between two and three megabytes had been recovered.

== Posthumous television series ==
Star Trek: Deep Space Nine was already in development when Roddenberry died, but the idea was not fully formed at the time and he was unable to sign off on the project. Berman said that: "He was quite ill, and I never got a chance to tell him what the ideas were, what they were about. But I definitely discussed things with him enough to know that he trusted me and had given me his blessings." The series began filming less than a year after Roddenberry's death. Berman continued to lead Star Trek through Deep Space Nine and Star Trek: Voyager, but said that though his vision did not entirely align with Roddenberry's, he respected his mentor's views. Berman said: "I don't believe the 24th century is going to be like Gene Roddenberry believed it to be, that people will be free from poverty and greed. But if you're going to write and produce for Star Trek, you've got to buy into that."

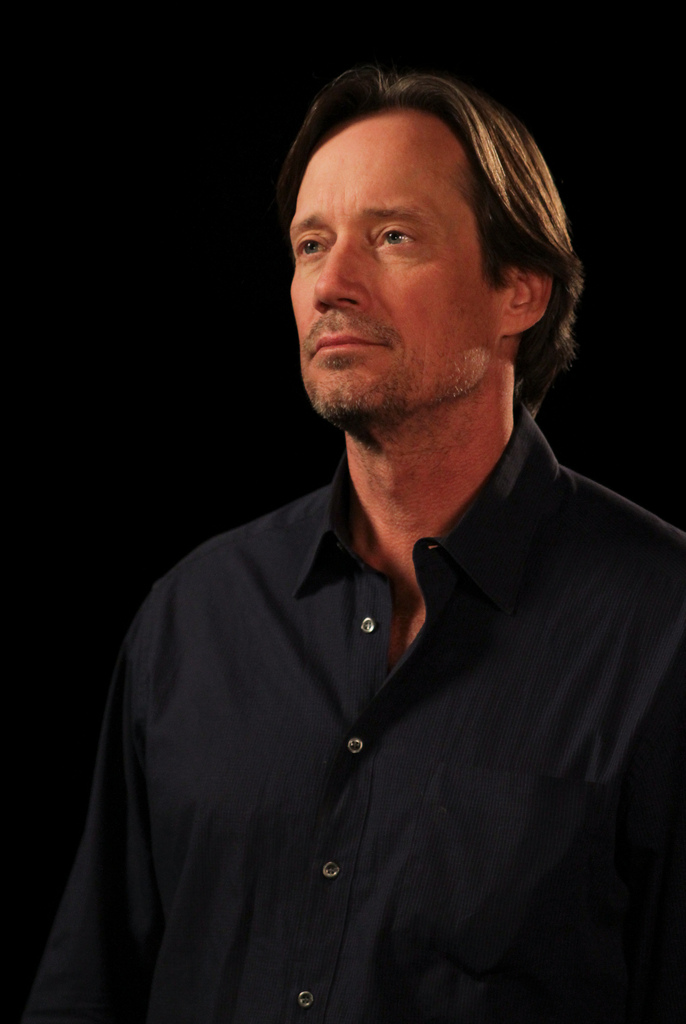
Kevin Sorbo, executive producer and lead actor in Gene Roddenberry's Andromeda

In early 1996, Majel Barrett-Roddenberry uncovered scripts, and a five-year plan by Roddenberry dating from 1977, for a series called Battleground Earth. Roddenberry had planned to create a pilot for the series for 20th Century Fox Television, but this was postponed due to work on the resurgent Star Trek. The project was sent to distributors by the Creative Artists Agency, and it was picked up by Tribune Entertainment who set the budget at over $1 million per episode. Tribune's president Dick Askin said that due to interest already received from European channels because of the Roddenberry affiliation, the series had the possibility of becoming a global franchise. The series was renamed Earth: Final Conflict before launch.

While production was underway on Earth: Final Conflict, Barrett discussed the volume of material in Roddenberry's archive with Askin. She asked his team to go through the archive to determine if there were any other source materials for possible television series. She said of the archive: "Gene was so prolific about writing. When he would get going on something and if, say, it didn't pass with a studio or a network, he would put it away or just throw it in the waste basket. I don't know if I was psychic or what, but I kept a lot of it." The Tribune team found two potential series in the archive, Genesis and Andromeda. In late 1999, they green-lit Andromeda for release in broadcast syndication; it sold to 85% of the United States and launched in autumn of 2000. Star Trek fan Kevin Sorbo was signed as the lead for the series, and helped convince studio executives to select it over Genesis. He became one of the executive producers of the series alongside Majel Barrett-Roddenberry, Robert Hewitt Wolfe, and Eric Gold. A pilot for Genesis was filmed, and was retained for possible future expansion. After an initial order for two seasons, 110 episodes were ultimately aired over five seasons.

At the same time as Andromeda and Genesis, Tribune also worked on a third Roddenberry series titled Starship. They aimed to launch it via the network route rather than into syndication. It was about the people of Earth teaching art and harmony to the rest of the universe. Rod Roddenberry, president of Roddenberry Productions, announced in 2010, at his father's posthumous induction into the Academy of Television Arts and Sciences Hall of Fame, that he was aiming to take The Questor Tapes to television. He said: "My father always felt that Questor was the one that got away, he believed that the show had the potential to be bigger than Star Trek." Rod was developing the series alongside Imagine Television. Rod would go on to create the two-hour television movie Trek Nation regarding the impact of his father's work.
