= Star Trek: The Magazine =

Tabloid-size periodical, 1999 to 2003

Star Trek: The Magazine was an authorized monthly tabloid-size periodical published in the United States and Canada by Fabbri Publishing (US) devoted to the Star Trek franchise. It ran for 48 issues, from May 1999 through April 2003, covering nearly 5,000 pages. There were three volumes, the first with 24 issues, and the latter two with 12 issues each.

The magazine was notable for its exclusive interviews with actors and production crew. Each issue also featured detailed technical briefings, many of which were lifted from the European Star Trek Fact Files. Advertisements in ST:TM were scarce.

A significant feature of later issues was the "Starfleet Technical Database", written by Rick Sternbach. The lengthy articles provided exclusive backstory and carry the same semi-canon weight as the technical manuals, which he also contributed to. Some of his material was reclaimed from an abandoned Star Trek: Voyager Technical Manual.

== Contents ==
The issues listed below are intended as a general reference and are not exhaustive.

=== Volume 1 ===
| Issue | Date | Interviews | Technical Briefings | Other |
|---|---|---|---|---|
| v1 No. 1 | 5/99 | Patrick Stewart | USS Enterprise (NCC-1701-E), Son'a, Borg | |
| v1 No. 2 | 6/99 | Kate Mulgrew, Jason Alexander | Deep Space Nine, U.S.S. Prometheus (NX-59650), Klingons, Starfleet and the Federation | |
| v1 No. 3 | 7/99 | Leonard Nimoy, Armin Shimerman | USS Enterprise (NCC-1701), weapons, transporters | designing the Akira |
| v1 No. 4 | 8/99 | Nicole de Boer, John de Lancie | USS Voyager (NCC-74656), communications, Starfleet uniforms: 2266, Romulans | designing the USS Defiant (NX-74205) |
| v1 No. 5 | 9/99 | Garrett Wang, Wil Wheaton | USS Enterprise (NCC-1701-D), Species 8472, parallel Earths | |
| v1 No. 6 | 10/99 | Brent Spiner | USS Defiant (NX-74205), the Dominion, the Hirogen, Captain Kirk | DeForest Kelley tribute |
| v1 No. 7 | 11/99 | Nichelle Nichols, Ronald D. Moore, Max Grodénchik | USS Enterprise history, the Cardassians, holotechnology | |
| v1 No. 8 | 12/99 | René Auberjonois, Jennifer Hetrick | Delta Flyer, Jean-Luc Picard, the Kazon, the Vulcans | |
| v1 No. 9 | 1/00 | Robert Duncan McNeill, James Darren | starbases, the Ferengi, starship operations | |
| v1 No. 10 | 2/00 | Marina Sirtis, J. G. Hertzler | USS Enterprise (NCC-1701-D), computer systems, the Krenim, Seven of Nine | designing the USS Enterprise (NCC 1701) |
| v1 No. 11 | 3/00 | James Doohan, Martha Hackett | Nebula class starships, the Phoenix, the Bajorans | designing the USS Enterprise (NCC 1701) interiors |
| v1 No. 12 | 4/00 | Andrew Robinson, Robin Curtis | USS Enterprise (NCC-1701-A), Klingon Defense Force, stellar phenomena | designing the bat'leth |
| v1 No. 13 | 5/00 | Jonathan Frakes, William Campbell | USS Voyager (NCC-74656), the Malon, Kirk's crew | |
| v1 No. 14 | 6/00 | Robert Beltran, Chase Masterson | USS Enterprise (NCC-1701-C), Starfleet Uniforms 2350s–2365, Romulans, propulsion systems | |
| v1 No. 15 | 7/00 | Majel Barrett Roddenberry, William Sadler | Deep Space Nine, Lore's Borg, 24th century medical equipment | tribute to John Colicos, designing the Vor'cha |
| v1 No. 16 | 8/00 | Denise Crosby, Aron Eisenberg, Janice Voss | Earth history, Jem'Hadar attack ship, Gamma Quadrant races | The Animated Series |
| v1 No. 17 | 9/00 | Jeffrey Combs, Patti Yasutake, Wendy Neuss | USS Enterprise (NCC-1701), William Riker, Cardassian ships, spaceborne life forms | Star Trek: The Animated Series |
| v1 No. 18 | 10/00 | Kate Mulgrew, Marina Sirtis | USS Voyager (NCC-74656), Kathryn Janeway, Alice, the Klingon Civil War | special Star Trek: Voyager issue |
| v1 No. 19 | 11/00 | LeVar Burton, Cecily Adams | USS Enterprise (NCC-1701-B), the Think Tank, Trills, Starfleet uniforms 2271 | designing the USS Voyager (NCC-74656), reinventing the Klingons |
| v1 No. 20 | 12/00 | George Takei, John Savage | USS Relativity (NCV-474439-G), Spock, the Varro, the Bajorans | designing the USS Voyager (NCC-74656), reinventing the Klingons |
| v1 No. 21 | 1/01 | Tim Russ, René Auberjonois, Jonathan Del Arco | USS Enterprise (NCC-1701-D), Federation law, Borg Queen's ship, standard issue kit 2266 | designing the Type-6 shuttlecraft |
| v1 No. 22 | 2/01 | Dwight Schultz, Jonathan Frakes, Tiny Ron | SS Raven (NAR-32450), 23rd century aliens, Ferengi pod, Worf | designing the USS Enterprise (NCC-1701-B) interiors, Gold Key comics |
| v1 No. 23 | 3/01 | Alice Krige, Manu Intiraymi | USS Dauntless (NX-01-A), Federation starships – Steamrunner class, Saber class, the Borg | special Borg issue, Borg species designations |
| v1 No. 24 | 4/01 | Marc Alaimo, Susan Gibney, Martha Hackett | Miranda class, Wesley Crusher, the Vaadwaur, starfleet uniforms 2366-73 | |

=== Volume 2 ===
| Issue | Date | Interviews | Technical Briefings | Other |
|---|---|---|---|---|
| v2 No. 1 | 5/01 | William Shatner, Nichelle Nichols, Hans Beimler, Jonathan Del Arco | USS Grissom, Dr. McCoy, Q's anti-time future, 23rd century aliens | special Star Trek: The Original Series issue |
| v2 No. 2 | 6/01 | Roxann Dawson, Eric Menyuk | USS Stargazer (NCC-2893), Dr. Bashir, Jupiter station, tactics and maneuvers | designing Species 8472, designing Ares IV |
| v2 No. 3 | 7/01 | Robert Picardo | USS Voyager (NCC-74656), Kes, USS Equinox, worlds of the Delta Quadrant | 2 covers, designing Species 8472, designing USS Voyager (NCC-74656) |
| v2 No. 4 | 8/01 | Garrett Wang | Deep Space Nine, Kira Nerys, the Overlookers, games and sport | designing USS Voyager (NCC-74656) |
| v2 No. 5 | 9/01 | Cirroc Lofton | Pike's starship Enterprise, Tom Paris, Project Pathfinder, Starfleet roles | reinventing the Ferengi, designing the Type-12 shuttlecraft, Marvel's Star Trek: The Motion Picture-era Star Trek comics |
| v2 No. 6 | 10/01 | Patrick Stewart, Rick Sternbach | USS Enterprise (NCC-1701-E), Tasha Yar, the Voth, galactic archaeology | tribute to Gene Roddenberry, 35 years of Star Trek, who is in the Federation?, reinventing the Ferengi |
| v2 No. 7 | 11/01 | James Conway, John Eaves | Federation starships, Dominion fleet, Odo, 23rd century aliens | special Enterprise issue, Q, Enterprise lineage, DC's 1st volume of Star Trek comics |
| v2 No. 8 | 12/01 | Robert Wise, Stephen Collins | USS Enterprise 1701 refit, K't'inga, V'ger | 2 covers, special Star Trek: The Motion Picture issue, Persis Khambatta tribute |
| v2 No. 9 | 1/02 | Scott Bakula, Vaughn Armstrong | USS Prometheus (NX-59650), starship operations, Iden's rebellion, Geordi La Forge | aliens of TMP, designing the D7 Klingon battle cruiser |
| v2 No. 10 | 2/02 | Linda Park, Jeffrey Combs, James Horan | Delta Flyer, Scotty, Klingon culture, Starfleet uniforms 2270s–2340s | designing the Runabout |
| v2 No. 11 | 3/02 | Connor Trinneer, John Fleck | Captain Proton, Tuvok, Freedom class, Niagara class, 24th century aliens | First Contact storyboards, canon books |
| v2 No. 12 | 4/02 | Armin Shimerman, Majel Barrett | Shuttlecraft, Data, Irina's ship, 24th century aliens | 2 covers, special TNG first season issue |

=== Volume 3 ===
| Issue | Date | Interviews | Technical Briefings | Other |
|---|---|---|---|---|
| v3 No. 1 | 5/02 | Dominic Keating, Matt Winston | Ares IV, Miles O'Brien, the Lokirrim, Starfleet equipment | designing V'ger, Chief O'Brien's rank, Starfleet Technical Database – Intrepid Class Design Evolution 2361–2370, DC's TNG comics |
| v3 No. 2 | 6/02 | John Billingsley, Diana Muldaur, Tracy Tormé, Rob Bowman | Vulcan shuttle, Federation tug ship, the Mirror Universe, the Srivani | TNG season 2, designing the Klingon Raptor class |
| v3 No. 3 | 7/02 | Anthony Montgomery, Ethan Phillips, Jeffrey Combs, Clint Howard, Matt Malloy | Danube-class Runabouts, Delta Quadrant races, the Nightingale, Chakotay | designing the Ti'Mur, Picard's family album, Original series phaser props |
| v3 No. 4 | 8/02 | Ethan Phillips, Jonathan Frakes, Leonard John Crofoot | Admiral Janeway's shuttle, Starfleet personnel, Son'a scout ship, Dr. Crusher | TNG season 3, designing the USS Enterprise NCC-1701-C, making of "Yesterday's Enterprise" |
| v3 No. 5 | 9/02 | Nicholas Meyer, Robert Sallin, Walter Koenig, Paul Winfield | Project Genesis, Khan Noonien Singh, the Ba'Neth, a guide to sickness | 2 covers, special Star Trek II: The Wrath of Khan issue, Ceti eels, abandoned TWOK characters |
| v3 No. 6 | 10/02 | Patrick Stewart, Robert O'Reilly, David Ogden Stiers | USS Centaur NCC-42043, USS Rhode Island NCC-42043, stellar phenomena, Tsunkatse, Kai Winn | TNG 4th season |
| v3 No. 7 | 11/02 | Scott Bakula, Nichelle Nichols, Winrich Kolbe | USS Enterprise NCC-1701-D, the Dinaal, 23rd century aliens | Starfleet Technical Database – Klingon Technology: Personal Weapons |
| v3 No. 8 | 12/02 | Leonard Nimoy, Harve Bennett, Joe Menosky | USS Excelsior, the Qomar, the Bajorans | designing the Klingon Bird of Prey, TNG season 5, Ensign Ro |
| v3 No. 9 | 1/03 | Michael Dorn, Dina Meyer, John Logan | Federation vessels 2161–2377, Kor, Klingon Raptor class, USS Enterprise NCC-1701-D deck by deck | aliens of Star Trek III: The Search for Spock, designing the Excelsior, Starfleet Technical Database – Constellation Class |
| v3 No. 10 | 2/03 | Brent Spiner, Tom Hardy, Jonathan Frakes, Marina Sirtis, Stuart Baird, John Logan | USS Enterprise NCC-1701-D, Counselor Troi, Romulan Bird of Prey: 2152 | 3 covers, special Nemesis issue, designing the Reman Scorpion, Starfleet Technical Database – Romulan Propulsion Historical Overview, the Romulan Star Empire, designing the Scimitar |
| v3 No. 11 | 3/03 | Patrick Stewart, Michael Bell | Enterprise (NX-01), the EMH, deep space stations, 24th century aliens, USS Enterprise NCC-1701 | Nemesis abandoned ideas, the Bringloidi, designing the USS Enterprise NCC-1701-E, TNG season 6, ENT animatics, designing the USS Prometheus NX-59650, Malibu Comics' DS9 |
| v3 No. 12 | 4/03 | Nana Visitor, Casey Biggs, Nicholas Meyer | Deep Space Nine support craft, Benjamin Sisko, USS Enterprise NCC-1701-A, starship operations | 2 covers, DS9 10th anniversary issue, TNG season 7, matte painting, designing DS9 interiors, Starfleet Technical Database – Aeroshuttle Technology, designing Hirogen ships, Marvel's Paramount Trek comics |
