= Comparison of Star Trek and Star Wars =

Science fiction media comparison

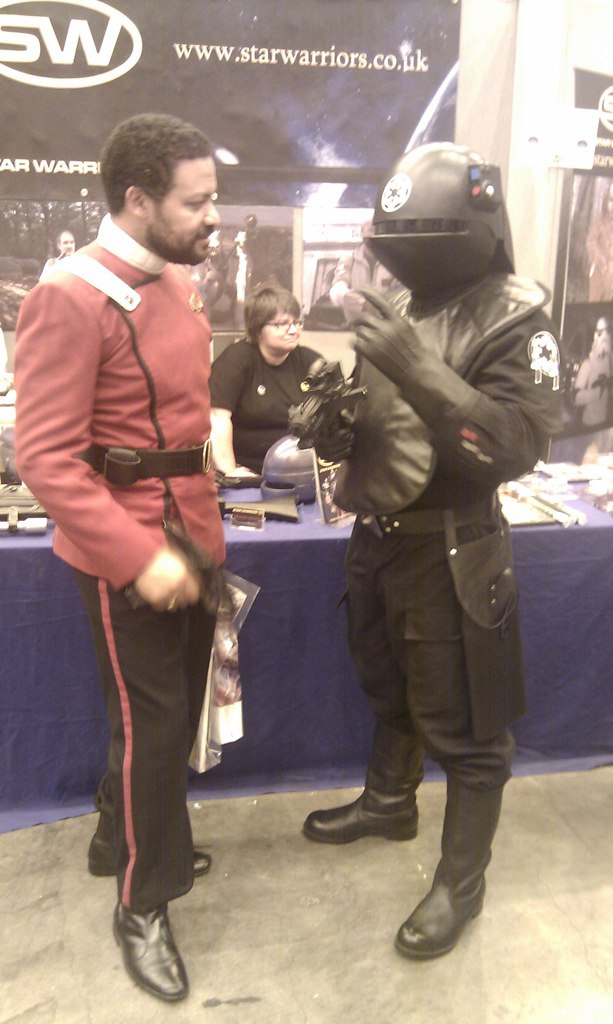
A fan of Star Trek dressed in Starfleet uniform (left) and a fan of Star Wars dressed in Imperial Death Star gunner uniform (right) at a fan convention

Star Trek and Star Wars are American media franchises that represent alternative scenarios of space adventure. The two franchises proliferate in this setting of storytelling, and each has offered various forms of media productions for decades.

== Background ==
Star Trek was introduced on September 8, 1966 as a live-action television series. It was originally billed for a five-year run, but only lasted three years until 1969. After 79 episodes, the show ended abruptly due to low television ratings. However, the quality of the production and storytelling led to a cult classic following, which later resulted in a resurgence of interest in the franchise. Star Trek: The Animated Series premiered in 1973 and lasted two seasons with 22 episodes. With the subsequent publication of novels, comics, animated series, toys, and eventually new TV series and feature films which are still produced to this day, Star Trek grew into a popular media franchise and continues to draw large crowds.

Star Wars was introduced on May 25, 1977, as a feature film, Star Wars (1977). A novelization titled Star Wars: From the Adventures of Luke Skywalker, based on the original script, was published about six months earlier. Upon the release of the first film, Star Wars grew into a popular media franchise. As of today, the Star Wars franchise includes twelve films, nine television series, books, comics, toys, and more. Each franchise comprises billions of dollars of intellectual property, employment for thousands, and entertainment for many more.

== Differences ==
Star Trek debuted on television. The franchise was conceived in the style of the television Western Wagon Train and the adventure stories of Horatio Hornblower, but evolved into a utopian prospect of future human society. Inspired by Gulliver's Travels, Star Trek's main focus is on space exploration and a galactic society consisting of multiple planets and species, where conflict occasionally occurs. Most of Star Trek occurs in the relatively distant future, specifically the 22nd through 24th centuries, with occasional time travel and interdimensional travel. The Earth of the Star Trek universe shares much of its history with the real world.

Star Wars debuted on film, despite the novel based on the film's original script having been published a year before the film itself. Star Wars belongs to the space opera subgenre of science fiction that follows The Hero's Journey, which stands for the proposition that personal change occurs and is necessary when confronting significant problems, and was inspired by works such as Beowulf, King Arthur and other mythologies, world religions, as well as ancient and medieval history. Star Wars depicts a galactic society in constant conflict. Though there are periods of peace, these are only documented in novels, comics, video games, non-feature films, and other spin-off media. Star Wars is set "a long time ago, in a galaxy far, far away," although many characters are human, occasionally use Earth metaphors, and exhibit human character traits.

== Similarities and commonalities ==
Aside from both having the word star in their titles, the two franchises have much in common, with both having their origins in the space Western subgenre.

Furthermore, both depict societies consisting of multiple planets and species. Star Trek's main protagonist group, the United Federation of Planets, consists of various planets, each inhabited by different species, which operates much like the United Nations. Star Wars depicts a galaxy that is mostly part of a single federation known as the Republic, inhabited by humans and countless other species, which later become the Galactic Empire and was again later reformed into a new society called the New Republic after a series of wars.

Both franchises promote philosophical and political messages.

The primary philosophies of Star Trek convey the morals of exploration and interference and how to properly confront and ethically resolve numerous new challenges. Creator Gene Roddenberry was inspired by morality tales such as Gulliver's Travels with the basic dramatic format inspired by the science fiction film Forbidden Planet.

The primary philosophical messages of Star Wars are the ethics of good against evil and how to distinguish them from one another. Star Wars preaches against totalitarian systems and favors societies that offer equality. In an interview on the Star Wars 20th Anniversary UK Program which aired in 1997, referring to the mythology of the original Star Wars trilogy, Patrick Stewart stated, "A belief in one's own powers, especially one's own powers to do good because the underlying morality of Star Wars is a very, very positive one."

Actors from both franchises have appeared on common television series such as The Outer Limits and SeaQuest DSV.

Both franchises also draw from history and ancient mythology, including Greco-Roman mythology. For example, many planets and alien species in Star Trek are named after ancient Roman deities. Several episodes from various Star Trek television series, such as "Who Mourns for Adonais," are directly based on ancient Phoenician-Greek themes and settings. The series also makes references to Ancient Babylon and its mythic folklore. The Klingons and their warrior culture is a representation of the 12th-century Mongols and 11th-century Vikings.

Similarly, many of Star Wars' plots and character developments are based on ancient history, including classical Greece and Rome, such as the fall of the Republic in Star Wars followed by the rise of the Galactic Empire, which parallels the civil war and subsequent fall of the ancient Roman Republic followed by the rise of the Roman Empire.

A 1983 documentary on the making of Star Wars Episode VI: Return of the Jedi was hosted by Leonard Nimoy, who mentioned creator George Lucas' original plan to do two other trilogies preceding and subsequent to the original trilogy.

=== Abrams era ===
Within the first two decades of the twenty-first century J. J. Abrams has become heavily involved in both franchises, as director and producer of Star Trek (2009) and Star Trek Into Darkness (2013), producer of Star Trek Beyond (2016), and director and producer of Star Wars: The Force Awakens (2015) and Star Wars: The Rise of Skywalker (2019). Star Trek (2009) and Star Wars: The Force Awakens (2015) are each the first entries in expected trilogies. These films received favorable critical and commercial responses and revived interest in both franchises. In addition to the behind the scenes work of Abrams, actors such as Simon Pegg starred in both series. The newer films of the two franchises filmed major scenes in the United Arab Emirates. The desert scenes on the planet Jakku in Star Wars: The Force Awakens (2015) were filmed in the Emirate of Abu Dhabi, while scenes for cities in the film Star Trek Beyond (2016) were filmed in the Emirate of Dubai.

Despite Abrams' Star Trek and Star Wars entries being financial and critical successes, the original filmmakers behind both franchises criticized Abrams for recycling storylines. For instance, Star Trek Into Darkness was considered by some to be less original than its Abrams-directed predecessor, and more of a loose remake of Star Trek II: Wrath of Khan. The director of Wrath of Khan, Nicholas Meyer, from which Star Trek Into Darkness borrowed lines and plot elements, revealed in 2018 that he was disappointed with the film, saying: "In my sort of artistic worldview, if you're going to do an homage, you have to add something. You have to put another layer on it, and they didn't. Just by putting the same words in different characters' mouths didn't add up to anything, and if you have someone dying in one scene and sort of being resurrected immediately after there's no real drama going on. It just becomes a gimmick or gimmicky, and that's what I found it to be ultimately."

Star Wars creator George Lucas shared a similar disappointment towards Abrams' Star Wars: The Force Awakens, finding himself agreeing with the critics who found it too derivative of his own original Star Wars trilogy, particularly his original film. During an interview with talk show host and journalist Charlie Rose that aired on December 24, 2015, Lucas likened his decision to sell Lucasfilm to Disney to a divorce, and outlined the creative differences between him and the producers of The Force Awakens. He described the previous six Star Wars films as his "children" and defended his vision for them, while criticizing The Force Awakens for having a "retro feel", saying: "I worked very hard to make them completely different, with different planets, with different spaceships – you know, to make it new." Lucas also likened Disney to "white slavers," which drew some criticism for which he later apologized. Of the batch of new Star Wars films, the Abrams written and directed films received the worst reception from Lucas. In 2017, Lucas described Star Wars Episode VIII: The Last Jedi as "beautifully made." The comment was interpreted as Lucas liking the Rian Johnson written and directed sequel more than The Force Awakens. The previous year, the Disney-produced Star Wars anthology film Rogue One had been released. Its production did not involve Abrams, and it was reported that Lucas also liked it more than The Force Awakens.

Years later, some critics agreed with Lucas' and Meyer's criticisms relative to Abrams written and directed Star Wars: The Rise of Skywalker. The website The Ringer noted the reception to the film was negative enough that the film (and its tie-ins) kept generating negative or controversial headlines in regards to the film's production for almost 10 months after its release. This film was the one where Abrams had the most creative control. Abrams was criticized for doubling down on Meyer's criticism of Star Trek Into Darkness by killing and instantly resurrecting almost every character in the film. Force powers to revive others were a central plot of the film, but they lost all meaning due to most resurrections not having anything having to do with such powers, including those of major characters in the film like Palpatine, Chewbacca, C-3PO and even minor cameo characters Zorry Bliss and Babu Frik. The Rise of Skywalker was also criticized for being another derivative remake of a previous film in the franchise, this time of the Lucas-written Return of the Jedi. Certain websites have defended Johnson's The Last Jedi, and blamed Abrams and Disney for the failure of Rise of Skywalker, while criticizing Abrams's usage of his "mystery box" storytelling, a reference to leaving some aspects or history of the characters unanswered and forcing the audience and followers to speculate.

Abrams has faced criticism from fans for decisions made in the Star Trek franchise as well. For instance, Abrams was criticized for casting the classic Star Trek character of Khan Noonien Singh, who was Sikh and a former ruler of much of Eastern Eurasia in the original series, to a non-Sikh character in Star Trek Into Darkness. In Star Trek Into Darkness, Khan is played by Londoner Benedict Cumberbatch, whom some perceived as replacing an explicitly non-white character in the Star Trek canon with a light-skinned European actor, something that had been termed whitewashing by some. American Sikhs, who were hoping for an actor from their community to be cast in such a feature role, villain or not. Star Trek: Voyager actor Garrett Wang stated, "The casting of Cumberbatch was a mistake on the part of the producers. I am not being critical of the actor or his talent, just the casting". George Takei, the original Hikaru Sulu, was also disappointed with the casting, as he thought it would have been better to cast Cumberbatch not as an established villain like Khan but as a new character.

On Trekmovie.com, co-producer and co-screenwriter Bob Orci addressed Khan's casting: "Basically, as we went through the casting process and we began honing in on the themes of the movie, it became uncomfortable for me to support demonizing anyone of color, particularly anyone of Middle Eastern descent or anyone evoking that. One of the points of the movie is that we must be careful about the villain within US, not some other race." Abrams addressed some of the film's shortcomings. He thought that the dynamic of Kirk and Spock's relationship in the film "wasn't really clear." For keeping the identity of Khan a secret before the film's release, Abrams felt he "was trying to preserve the fun for the audience, and not just tell them something that the characters don't learn for 45 minutes into the movie, so the audience wouldn't be so ahead of it." In the end, Abrams recognized that "there were certain things I was unsure of.... Any movie ... has a fundamental conversation happening during it. And [for Into Darkness,] I didn't have it.... [The problems with the plot] was not anyone's fault but mine, or, frankly, anyone's problem but mine. [The script] was a little bit of a collection of scenes that were written by my friends.... And yet, I found myself frustrated by my choices, and unable to hang my hat on an undeniable thread of the main story. So, then I found myself on that movie basically tap-dancing as well as I could to try and make the sequences as entertaining as possible.... I would never say that I don't think that the movie ended up working. But I feel like it didn't work as well as it could have had I made some better decisions before we started shooting."

== Estimated financial comparisons ==
As of 2024, there are more Star Wars fans than Trekkies, according to Akiva Goldsman, with the Marvel Cinematic Universe having more fans than either. Despite the similar number of films, the profit made by the Star Wars film series exceeds the profit of the Star Trek film series by six times, while the entire Star Wars franchise surpasses Star Trek by four times. It is difficult to accurately judge the total worth of each franchise as the many television series, novels, memorabilia, video games, and other factors must be taken into account.

- Star Trek films (US$ million)
  Year	Title	Budget	Box office	Net
  1979	The Motion Picture	35	139	104
  1982	The Wrath of Khan	12	96	84
  1984	The Search for Spock	18	87	69
  1986	The Voyage Home	24	133	109
  1989	The Final Frontier	30	70	40
  1991	The Undiscovered Country	27	96.9	69.9
  1994	Generations	38	120	82
  1996	First Contact	46	150	104
  1998	Insurrection	70	117	47
  2002	Nemesis	60	67	7
  2009	Star Trek (reboot)	140	386	247
  2013	Into Darkness	190	467	277
  2016	Beyond	185	343	158
  Total	13 films	875	2,271	1,397
- Star Wars films (US$ million)
  Year	Title	Budget	Box office	Net
  1977	Star Wars	11	786.6	775.6
  1980	The Empire Strikes Back	23	534.1	511.1
  1983	Return of the Jedi	32.5	572.7	540.2
  1999	The Phantom Menace	115	1027	912
  2002	Attack of the Clones	115	656.6	541.6
  2005	Revenge of the Sith	115	848.9	733.9
  2008	The Clone Wars	8.5	68.6	60.1
  2015	The Force Awakens	306	2058	1752
  2016	Rogue One	200	1056	856
  2017	The Last Jedi	200	1321	1121
  2018	Solo	275	392.9	117.9
  2019	The Rise of Skywalker	275	1074	799
  Total	12 films	1,676	10,396.4	8,720.4

Franchise	Year of inception	Original work	Films	Total box office	TV series	Total revenue
Star Trek	1966	Star Trek: The Original Series (TV)	13	$2.271 billion	11	$7.8 billion (as of 1998)
Star Wars	1977	Star Wars (film)	12	$8.923 billion	16	$42 billion (as of 2015)

== Critique and commentaries ==
Science fiction writer David Brin criticized Star Wars at the time of the release of The Phantom Menace, arguing that while the Star Wars movies provide special effects and action/adventure, audiences are not encouraged to engage with their overriding themes. Among his issues with Star Wars and George Lucas, whom he accused of "having an agenda," is that the Star Wars galaxy is too "elitist," with arbitrary rulers on both the evil and good sides, replacing one another without any involvement of the population. He criticizes both sides of the Galactic Civil War as part of the "same genetically superior royal family." He finds the Star Wars universe flawed with additional forms of absolutism, such as justified emotions leading a good person to evil – for example citing the idea that Luke Skywalker killing Palpatine would somehow turn him to the dark side, despite the act potentially saving millions of lives. Among the many other flaws he sees with Star Wars is that Anakin Skywalker becomes a hero at the end of Return of the Jedi simply because he saved his son's life, while the atrocities he committed during his time in power go largely ignored. In contrast, he argues that, despite its flaws, Star Trek is "democratic," takes up more multifaceted issues, and values "cooperation and wit."

William Shatner argues that Star Trek is superior to Star Wars. According to him, "Star Trek had relationships and conflict among the relationships and stories that involved humanity and philosophical questions." Shatner believes that Star Wars was only better than Star Trek in terms of special effects, and that once J.J. Abrams became involved, Star Trek was able to "supersede Star Wars on every level."

Tim Russ, who played Tuvok in Star Trek: Voyager, claims that it is difficult to find common enough elements to be able to compare the two. Among those common elements are their similar settings populated by unique characters and technologies. He echoed Shatner that Star Trek reflects common human issues, the morals of exploration, and considers ethical questions. Star Wars in his view is a classic medieval tale dressed up as action-adventure, and that embraces the Eastern philosophy of inner strength. Russ concludes that despite both their success and popularity, Star Trek comes out as the better of the two, as it is set in "our" galaxy and therefore people can relate better to it, whereas Star Wars takes place in another galaxy. He acknowledged that he could be biased.

Jeremy Bulloch was best known for his role as Boba Fett in the original Star Wars trilogy. He was a huge fan of Star Trek: The Original Series. He argued that while both franchises are popular, Star Wars comes out as the superior, for its soundtracks and special effects.

Contrasting the focus of the two franchises, contributor J. C. Herzthe of The New York Times argued, "Trek fandom revolves around technology because the Star Trek universe was founded on ham-fisted dialogue and Gong Show-caliber acting. But the fictional science has always been brilliant. The science in Star Wars is nonsense, and everyone knows it. But no one cares because Star Wars isn't about science. It's epic drama. It's about those incredibly well-developed characters and the moral decisions they face. People don't get into debates about how the second Death Star works. They get into debates about the ethics of blowing it up."

John Wenzel of The Denver Post highlighted two differences in approach, noting the "swashbuckling" and "gunslinger" style of Star Wars compared with Star Trek's "broader themes of utopian living, justice, and identity" and that the spiritual aspect of Star Wars contrasts with the balance of emotion and logic seen in Star Trek.

Billionaire Peter Thiel told Maureen Dowd of The New York Times in a 2017 interview, "I'm a capitalist. Star Wars is the capitalist show. Star Trek is the communist one." He further stated "There is no money in Star Trek because you just have the transporter machine that can make anything you need. The whole plot of Star Wars starts with Han Solo having this debt that he owes and so the plot in Star Wars is driven by money."

Archived footage in the 2011 documentary produced by Gene Roddenberry's son, Trek Nation, showed Gene Roddenberry opining, "I like Star Wars. It was young King Arthur growing up, slaying the evil emperor finally. There's nothing wrong with that kind of entertainment—everything doesn't have to create a philosophy for you—for your whole life. You can also have fun."

== Influences on each other ==
William Shatner once described the relationship between the two franchises as "symbiotic," crediting Star Wars for launching the Star Trek films. He repeated this sentiment at a 2016 Star Trek fan convention in Las Vegas by stating, "Star Wars created Star Trek." He clarified this statement by explaining that at the time of the release of the first Star Wars film (A New Hope), Paramount, then under new management, was struggling to come up with something that could compete with it. A Star Trek relaunch was the choice. Since then, public interest has returned to Star Trek. "It was Star Wars that thrust Star Trek into the people of Paramount's consciousness," Shatner stated.

The documentary Trek Nation features interviews where both Lucas and Roddenberry praise each other's respective franchises, with the former stating that Star Trek was an influence while writing the original screenplay for Star Wars. He explained that while both franchises were so "far out," Star Trek produced a fanbase that "softened up the entertainment arena" so that Star Wars could "come along and stand on its shoulders." This is also acknowledged by Shatner, who went as far as to call Star Wars a "derivative" of Star Trek.

A few references to Star Wars have been inserted into Star Trek films. For fleeting moments, one can see ships and droids from Star Wars in Star Trek: First Contact (1996), as well as Star Trek (2009) and Star Trek Into Darkness (2013). Some Star Trek films and television episodes used the Star Wars animation shop, Industrial Light & Magic, for their special effects.

When Roddenberry was honored at a Star Trek convention late in life, a congratulatory letter from Lucas was presented by an actor dressed as Darth Vader. A few years earlier, Roddenberry had contributed an entry in honor of Star Wars and Lucas at a convention honoring the latter.

== Comic relief ==
William Shatner was a presenter at Lucas' American Film Institute Lifetime Achievement Award ceremony in 2007 and did a comical stage performance honoring Lucas.

In 2015, at a live concert, Shatner dressed as an Imperial stormtrooper singing "Girl Crush" alongside Carrie Underwood and Brad Paisley.

In 2011, Shatner and Carrie Fisher posted a series of humorous YouTube videos satirizing each other's franchises. In a 2016 interview, Shatner commented that Captain Kirk and Princess Leia eloping and running off into the sunset would be the "perfect union" between Star Trek and Star Wars. Shatner has also posted several humorous tweets on his X (Twitter) account mocking Star Wars. Among them was a post commemorating the 35th anniversary of the poorly received Star Wars Holiday Special. In response, Star Wars actor Peter Mayhew posted a "retaliation" tweet congratulating Shatner for the directing of Star Trek V: The Final Frontier, another poorly-received film.

== Future ==
After the Star Trek reboot trilogy, several sequels are set to follow. A new television series based on the original timeline, subtitled Discovery, serving as a prequel to the original series, debuted on CBS All Access in 2017. As of March 2024, more Star Trek television series were airing than ever before. 900 episodes and 13 feature films totaling 668 hours had been produced over 58 years.

After the debut of Star Wars Rebels, several projects were undertaken including a television series set in between the Star Wars prequels and the original trilogy, The Mandalorian, a television series set in between the original trilogy and the Star Wars sequel trilogy, and an anthology of stand-alone Star Wars films, starting with Rogue One, which was released in December 2016, and Solo: A Star Wars Story following in May 2018. Additionally, more spin-off media is also underway.

=== Fan work ===
Aside from official works by the producers of Star Trek and Star Wars, many fan films and webisodes set in the two universes of the franchises are also constantly produced and posted on the Internet by fans, but are not officially considered canon concerning either franchise.
