= DriveSavers =

DriveSavers, Inc.
- Type: Private
- Industry: Data Recovery
- Founded: 1985
- Founder: Jay Hagan, Scott Gaidano
- Headquarters: Novato, California
- Key people: Alex Hagan, CEO; Scott Moyer, President; Jay Hagan, Chairman
- Website: drivesaversdatarecovery.com

DriveSavers, Inc. is a computer hardware data recovery company located in Novato, California. It was founded by former CEO Jay Hagan and former company President Scott Gaidano in 1985.

== History ==
In 1985, former Jasmine Technologies executives Jay Hagan and Scott Gaidano founded DriveSavers, operating from Gaidano’s condo with $1,400. DriveSavers originally offered both hard drive repair and data recovery services, but the company dropped its drive repair services within its first eight months.

In 1992, DriveSavers signed an agreement with SuperMac Technology to assume technical support and warranty obligations for SuperMac Mass Storage Products.

The company merged with Data Recovery Disk Repair in 1994 and retained the DriveSavers name. In 2008, DriveSavers invested two million dollars to build a series of five ISO-certified cleanrooms to disassemble and rebuild damaged hard drives.

From 2004-2009, the company grew from 35 to 85 employees.

DriveSavers also works with "the more secretive" branches of government and celebrities. In order to provide comfort and assistance to clients with a data loss situation, DriveSavers has on staff an individual "data crisis counselor." This counselor has had experience in working for a suicide hotline.

DriveSavers is the only recovery firm licensed with every major hard-drive manufacturer, so their work on a drive does not void the warranty. It can recover data from hard disk drives, solid state drives, smart phones, servers, digital camera media and iOS devices. The company can recover data from T2 and M1-powered Macs with embedded SSD storage. Even with cloud backup, personal data loss is still possible, but can be recovered. The company recovered data from old floppy disks of the deceased Star Trek creator Gene Roddenberry, potentially containing lost episodes of the franchise.

DriveSavers is certified HIPAA-compliant, undergoes annual SOC2 Type II reviews and has encryption training certificates from GuardianEdge, PGP, PointSec and Utimaco.

== Security certifications and practices ==
DriveSavers facility is made up of cleanrooms. The cleanrooms come in different ratings depending on the application and range from federal standards of 100,000 to 100. The rating is a measure of the number of 0.1-micron-sized airborne particulates per square meter.

DriveSavers employees have to go through background checks, because of contracts with state, and federal government agencies. The company also has to meet data-security standards that its clients do, like HIPAA certification to work with hospitals and GLBA certification to work with financial institutions.

== Awards ==
- Storage Visions, Visionary Company Award, 2014
- Flash Memory Summit, Most Innovative Flash Memory Consumer Application Award, 2018
- Better Business Bureau, A+ rating

== See also ==
- List of data recovery companies
