= North Toronto Players =

Theatre group

The North Toronto Players is a theatre group, founded in 1966 as the St. Timothy Players. Their productions are staged at Papermill Theatre, at historic Todmorden Mills on Pottery Road in East York, Toronto.

== Productions ==
While they are mostly known for their Gilbert & Sullivan work, the Company also creates their own productions. Among these is H.M.S. Starship Pinafore: The Next Generation, a Star Trek adaptation of two famous Gilbert and Sullivan operettas (HMS Pinafore and Trial by Jury) which was produced in 1999, 2004, 2016 and 2026.

In 2016 NTP mounted an original production Chelsea Moor Castle (or, The Contract to Marry) featuring 26 of Arthur Sullivan's tunes and lyrics by director Michael Harms and his wife Barb Scheffler.

In March of 2025 NTP produced another original comedic opera, Dracula (Or, the fiancée and the fiend) starring Michael Harms as Dracula and Scheffler as Van Helsing with music by Sullivan, Puccini, Rossini, Mozart, Wagner and Bizet.
