= Trek Nation =

2011 television film

- Directed by: Scott Colthorp
- Narrated by: Rod Roddenberry
- Country of origin: United States
- Original language: English

Production
- Producers: Rod Roddenberry; Trevor Roth; Nicole Rittenmeyer
- Running time: 82 minutes

Original release
- Network: Science Channel
- Release: November 30, 2011

Trek Nation is a 2011 documentary film directed by Scott Colthorp examining the positive impact that Star Trek and creator Gene Roddenberry may have had on people's lives as seen through the eyes of his son, Eugene "Rod" Roddenberry, Jr. It includes interviews with cast members and crew from all five Star Trek incarnations as well as with various fans and celebrities who were markedly influenced by the show while growing up. Rod Roddenberry also visits Skywalker Ranch to learn about the influence Star Trek had on George Lucas. The film premiered on November 30, 2011 on Science.

== Production ==
The documentary was conceived in 2001, although Rod Roddenberry said in interviews that the concept began with the death of his father, Gene Roddenberry, in 1991. He stated that the film was based on discovering his father rather than Star Trek in general. It was shot by Rod Roddenberry between 2001 and 2010, he said that "I'd never done a documentary before. This was 10 years of trying to figure out what to do. We made mistakes all the way." Trek Nation was produced by Roddenberry Entertainment and New Animal Productions, with Roddenberry, Trevor Roth and Nicole Rittenmeyer as executive producers.

It was created as an antithesis to the 1997 documentary Trekkies, and was intended not to concentrate as heavily on costumed fans of Star Trek.

Trek Nation was first broadcast in the United States on the television channel Science on November 30, 2011. It was first broadcast in the United Kingdom on the channel Quest on July 29, 2012.

== Reception ==
John Tenuto of TrekNews.net wrote " it is rare that after 45 years, any Star Trek documentary could present surprising information or genuine emotional content considering all that has precede it. Trek Nation achieves both results." Jana J. Monji of RogerEbert.com described it as a "somewhat indulgent documentary". The A.V. Club wrote: "There are plenty of positives to be found in the documentary, but the lack of singular direction doesn’t allow for a coherent through line."

== Home media ==
The documentary was released as two disc DVD on 9 July 2013.
