= Voth =

Voth may be a surname or refer to a place:

== Surname ==
Voth is a surname. Notable people with the surname include:

- Austin Voth, American baseball player
- Brad Voth, Canadian ice hockey player
- Christopher Voth (born 1990), Canadian volleyball player
- Henry Voth (1855–1931), American Mennonite missionary and ethnographer
- Julia Voth (born 1985), Canadian actress and model

=== Fictional characters ===
- Voth, a fictional race in Star Trek, see Distant Origin
- Irma Voth, title character of Miriam Toews's novel Irma Voth

== Places and locations ==
- Voth, Texas, a neighborhood of Beaumont, Texas and formerly an unincorporated community
