= Christopher Voth =

Canadian volleyball player (born 1990)

Personal information
- Nationality: Canadian
- Born: 27 September 1990 (age 36)
- Hometown: Winnipeg, Manitoba
- Height: 197 cm (6 ft 6 in)
- Weight: 81 kg (179 lb)
- Spike: 347 cm (137 in)
- Block: 315 cm (124 in)
- Education: University of Manitoba

Volleyball information
- Position: Outside Hitter

Career
| Years | Teams |
|---|---|
| 2008–2013; 2014–2016; 2016–2017; 2017–2018; 2018–2019 | Manitoba Bisons; Abiant Lycurgus; Perungan Pojat; SKV Volejbal; Abiant Lycurgus |

National team
| 2013–2015 | Canada |
- Last updated: 2024-08-08

Christopher Voth (born 27 September 1990) is a Canadian former professional volleyball player. He was part of the Canada men's national volleyball team. On club level he played left side for Abiant Lycurgus. Voth is openly gay and came out as the first openly gay national athlete from Canada.
