= Star Trek =

American science fiction media franchise

- Created by: Gene Roddenberry
- Original work: Star Trek (1966–1969)
- Owners: Paramount Pictures (Skydance)
- Years: 1966–present

Print publications
- Books: List of fictional works; List of reference books; List of technical manuals
- Novels: List of novels
- Comics: List of comics
- Magazines: Star Trek Explorer (Note: Published as Star Trek Monthly from 1995 until 2003); Star Trek: The Magazine

Films and television
- Films: List of films
- Television series: List of television series

Games
- Traditional: List of games

Miscellaneous
- Theme park attractions: Star Trek: The Experience; Star Trek: Operation Enterprise
- Exhibits: Star Trek: The Exhibition

Official website
- startrek.com

Star Trek is an American science fiction media franchise created by Gene Roddenberry and owned by Paramount, which began with the series of the same name and became a worldwide pop culture phenomenon. Since its creation, the franchise has expanded into various films, television series, video games, novels, and comic books, and it has become one of the most recognizable and highest-grossing media franchises of all time.

The franchise began with Star Trek (The Original Series), which premiered on September 6, 1966, on Canada's CTV network. In the United States, it debuted on September 8, 1966, on NBC. The series followed the voyages and crew of the starship USS Enterprise, a space exploration vessel built by the United Federation of Planets in the 23rd century, on a mission "to explore strange new worlds, to seek out new life and new civilizations, to boldly go where no man has gone before". In creating Star Trek, Roddenberry was inspired by C. S. Forester's Horatio Hornblower series of novels, Jonathan Swift's 1726 novel Gulliver's Travels, the 1956 film Forbidden Planet, and television westerns such as Wagon Train.

The Star Trek canon includes The Original Series, several subsequent television series, and a film franchise; further adaptations also exist in expanded media. After the conclusion of The Original Series, the adventures of its characters continued in The Animated Series, and six feature films. A television revival beginning in the late 1980s and concluding in the mid 2000s saw four spinoff series: The Next Generation, following the crew of a new starship Enterprise a century after the original series; Deep Space Nine and Voyager, both set in the same era as the Next Generation; and Enterprise, set a century before the original series in the early days of human interstellar travel. The adventures of the Next Generation crew continued in four additional feature films. In 2009, the film franchise underwent a reboot, creating an alternate continuity known as the Kelvin timeline; three films have been set in this continuity. The most recent Star Trek revival began streaming on digital platforms in 2017 with series set at various points in the original continuity: Discovery (seasons 1–2) and Strange New Worlds set before The Original Series; anthology series Short Treks; Picard, Lower Decks and Prodigy set during or after the Next Generation era; and Discovery (seasons 3–5) and Starfleet Academy set in the 32nd century.

Star Trek has been a cult phenomenon for decades. Fans of the franchise are called "Trekkies" or "Trekkers". The franchise spans a wide range of spin-offs including games, figurines, novels, toys, and comics. From 1998 to 2008, there was a Star Trek–themed attraction in Las Vegas. At least two museum exhibits of props travel the world. The constructed language Klingon was created for the franchise. Several Star Trek parodies have been made, and viewers have produced several fan productions.

Star Trek is noted for its cultural influence beyond works of science fiction. The franchise is also notable for its progressive stances on civil rights. The Original Series included one of the first multiracial casts on American television.

== Conception and setting ==
As early as 1964, Gene Roddenberry drafted a proposal for the science fiction series that would become Star Trek. Although he publicly marketed it as a Western in outer space—a so-called "Wagon Train to the stars"—he privately told friends that he was modeling it on Jonathan Swift's Gulliver's Travels, intending each episode to act on two levels: as a suspenseful adventure story and as a morality tale.

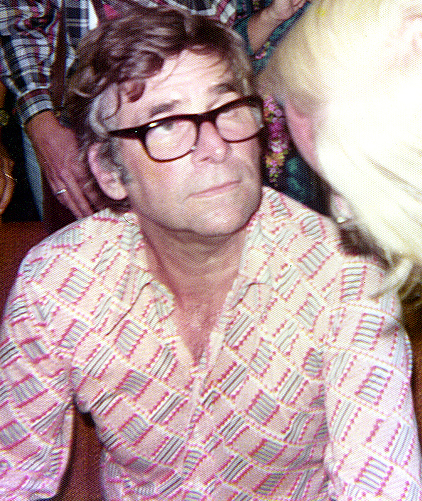
Star Trek creator, producer and writer Gene Roddenberry (c. 1976)

Most Star Trek stories depict the adventures of humans and aliens who serve in Starfleet, the space-borne humanitarian and peacekeeping armada of the United Federation of Planets. The protagonists have altruistic values, and must apply these ideals to difficult dilemmas.

Many of the conflicts and political dimensions of Star Trek are allegories of contemporary cultural realities. The Original Series addressed issues of the 1960s, just as later spin-offs have tackled issues of their respective decades. Issues depicted in the various series include war and peace, the value of personal loyalty, authoritarianism, imperialism, class warfare, economics, racism, religion, human rights, sexism, feminism, and the role of technology. Roddenberry stated: "[By creating] a new world with new rules, I could make statements about sex, religion, Vietnam, politics, and intercontinental missiles. Indeed, we did make them on Star Trek: we were sending messages and fortunately they all got by the network. If you talked about purple people on a far off planet, they (the television network) never really caught on. They were more concerned about cleavage. They actually would send a censor down to the set to measure a woman's cleavage to make sure too much of her breast wasn't showing."

Roddenberry intended the show to have a progressive political agenda reflective of the emerging counter-culture of the youth movement, though he was not fully forthcoming to the networks about this. He wanted Star Trek to show what humanity might develop into, if it would learn from the lessons of the past, most specifically by ending violence. An extreme example is the alien species known as the Vulcans, who had a violent past but learned to control their emotions. Roddenberry also gave Star Trek an anti-war message and depicted the United Federation of Planets as an ideal, optimistic version of the United Nations. His efforts were opposed by the network because of concerns over marketability, e.g., they opposed Roddenberry's insistence that Enterprise have a racially diverse crew.

== History and production ==
=== The Original Series era (1965–1969) ===
Spock and Kirk in the original series, played by Leonard Nimoy and William Shatner

In early 1964, Roddenberry presented a brief treatment for a television series to Desilu Productions, calling it "a Wagon Train to the stars". Desilu studio head Lucille Ball was instrumental in approving production of the series. The studio worked with Roddenberry to develop the treatment into a script, which was then pitched to NBC.

NBC paid to make a pilot, "The Cage", starring Jeffrey Hunter as Enterprise Captain Christopher Pike. NBC rejected "The Cage", but the executives were still impressed with the concept, and made the unusual decision to commission a second pilot: "Where No Man Has Gone Before".

While the show initially enjoyed high ratings, the average rating of the show at the end of its first season dropped to 52nd out of 94 programs. Unhappy with the show's ratings, NBC threatened to cancel the show during its second season. The show's fan base, led by Bjo Trimble, conducted an unprecedented letter-writing campaign, petitioning the network to keep the show on the air. NBC renewed the show, but moved it from primetime to the "Friday night death slot", and substantially reduced its budget. In protest, Roddenberry resigned as producer and reduced his direct involvement in Star Trek, which led to Fred Freiberger becoming producer for the show's third and final season. (Note: Roddenberry co-authored two scripts for the third season.) Despite another letter-writing campaign, NBC canceled the series after three seasons and 79 episodes.

=== Post–Original Series rebirth (1969–1991) ===
After the original series was canceled, Desilu, which by then had been renamed Paramount Television, licensed the broadcast syndication rights to help recoup the production losses. Reruns began in late 1969, and by 1974 the series aired in over 140 domestic and 54 international markets. This helped Star Trek develop a cult following among Trekkies greater than during its original run; by 1977 it had aired in 120 countries and the cast described Star Trek as "the most popular series in the world".

One sign of the series' growing popularity was the first Star Trek convention, held January 21–23, 1972, in New York City. Although the original expectation was that a few hundred fans would attend, several thousand turned up. Fans continue to attend similar conventions worldwide.

The series' newfound success led to the idea of reviving the franchise. Filmation with Paramount Television produced the first post–original series show, Star Trek: The Animated Series, featuring the cast of the original series reprising their roles. It ran on NBC for 22 half-hour episodes over two seasons on Saturday mornings from 1973 to 1974. Although short-lived, typical for animated productions in that time slot during that period, the series garnered the franchise's only Emmy Award in a "Best Series" category—specifically Outstanding Entertainment Children's Series; later Emmy awards for the franchise would be in technical categories. Paramount Pictures and Roddenberry began developing a new series, Star Trek: Phase II, in May 1975 in response to the franchise's newfound popularity. Work on the series ended when the proposed Paramount Television Service folded.

Following the success of the science fiction movies Star Wars and Close Encounters of the Third Kind, Paramount adapted the planned pilot episode of Phase II into the feature film Star Trek: The Motion Picture. The film opened in North America on December 7, 1979, with mixed reviews from critics. The film earned $139 million worldwide, below expectations but enough for Paramount to create a sequel. The studio forced Roddenberry to relinquish creative control of future sequels.

The success of the sequel, Star Trek II: The Wrath of Khan, reversed the fortunes of the franchise. While the sequel grossed less than the first movie, The Wrath of Khan's lower production costs made it net more profit. Paramount produced six Star Trek feature films between 1979 and 1991, each featuring the Original Series cast in their original roles.

By 1983 Paramount saw Star Trek as a media franchise that it could use across mediums beyond television and film, such as books through its publisher Simon & Schuster, and video games through its video game studio Sega. In 1987 it brought the franchise back to television with Star Trek: The Next Generation. Paramount chose to distribute the new series as a first-run syndication show rather than a network program. The series was set a century after the original, following the adventures of a new starship Enterprise with a new crew.

=== Post-Roddenberry television era (1991–2005) ===
Following Star Trek: The Motion Picture, Roddenberry's role was changed from producer to creative consultant, with minimal input to the films, while being heavily involved with the creation of The Next Generation. Roddenberry died on October 24, 1991, giving executive producer Rick Berman control of the franchise. Star Trek had become known to those within Paramount as "the franchise", because of its great success and recurring role as a tent pole for the studio when other projects failed. The Next Generation had the highest ratings of any Star Trek series and became the most syndicated show during the last years of its original seven-season run. In response to the Next Generation's success, Paramount released a spin-off series, Deep Space Nine, in 1993. While never as popular as the Next Generation, the series had sufficient ratings for it to last seven seasons.

In January 1995, a few months after the Next Generation ended, Paramount released a fourth television series, Voyager. Star Trek production reached a peak in the mid-1990s with Deep Space Nine and Voyager airing concurrently and three of the four Next Generation-based feature films released in 1994, 1996, and 1998. By 1998, Star Trek was Paramount's most important property and the profits of "the franchise" funded a significant portion of the studio's operations. Voyager became the flagship show of the new United Paramount Network (UPN) and thus the first major network Star Trek series since the original.

The actors who played the Captains on the first five Star Trek series, together in London at Destination Star Trek

After Voyager ended, UPN produced Enterprise, a prequel series. Enterprise did not enjoy the high ratings of its predecessors and UPN threatened to cancel it after the series' third season. Fans launched a campaign reminiscent of the one that saved the third season of the Original Series. Paramount renewed Enterprise for a fourth season, but moved it to the Friday night death slot. Like the Original Series, Enterprise's ratings dropped during this time slot, and UPN canceled Enterprise at the end of its fourth season. Enterprise aired its final episode on May 13, 2005. A fan group, "Save Enterprise", attempted to save the series and tried to raise $30 million to privately finance a fifth season of Enterprise. Though the effort garnered considerable press, the fan drive failed to save the series. The cancellation of Enterprise ended an eighteen-year continuous production run of Star Trek programming on television. The poor box office performance in 2002 of the film Nemesis cast an uncertain light upon the future of the franchise. Paramount relieved Berman, the franchise producer, of control of Star Trek.

=== Interregnum (2005–2009) ===
Following the disappointment of Nemesis in 2002, and as the 2005 cancellation of Enterprise loomed, the studio entertained concepts for several new plans for the franchise. Instead, J. J. Abrams was hired in 2006, and these early-stage projects were halted, unproduced.

Star Trek: The Beginning was a proposal for an Earth-Romulan War trilogy drawing inspiration from the Iliad, the Odyssey and the Serbo-Croatian War. Years later, critic Glen Oliver described Erik Jendresen's hastily-completed draft script as "a very, very different brand of Star Trek which smartly, even brazenly, upholds the mythology’s core values". Separately, Geoffrey Thorne wrote a treatment for Star Trek: Federation, a post-utopian series dealing with the ramifications of an era of peace and technical stagnation. He envisioned it as appealing to a mass audience: more "rough and tumble" and less pontification. Star Trek: Final Frontier was a short-form animated web series for startrek.com, but it was imperilled during preproduction by the Paramount–CBS breakup in 2006: Paramount Home Entertainment was interested in pursuing it, but CBS Television held the rights, and ultimately it was cancelled in December 2007. It was conceived as appealing to children and existing fans alike, and was set after a calamity in which warp travel was made useless. J. Michael Straczynski and Bryce Zabel also developed a reboot-the-universe plan in 2004, but never pitched it to the studio.

=== Reboot (Kelvin timeline) film series (2009–2016) ===
In 2007, Paramount hired a new creative team to reinvigorate the franchise on the big screen. Writers Roberto Orci and Alex Kurtzman and producer J. J. Abrams had the freedom to reinvent the feel of the franchise. The team created the franchise's eleventh film, Star Trek, releasing it in May 2009. The film featured a new cast portraying the crew of the original show. Star Trek was a prequel of the original series set in an alternate timeline, later named the Kelvin Timeline. This gave the film and sequels freedom from the need to conform to the franchise's canonical timeline and minimized the impact these films would have on CBS's portion of the franchise. The eleventh Star Trek film's marketing campaign targeted non-fans, stating in the film's advertisements that "this is not your father's Star Trek".

The film earned considerable critical and financial success, grossing (in inflation-adjusted dollars) more box office sales than any previous Star Trek film. The plaudits include the franchise's first Academy Award (for makeup). Two sequels were released. The first sequel, Star Trek Into Darkness, premiered in the spring of 2013. (Note: Star Trek Into Darkness premiered in Sydney, Australia, on April 23, 2013, but the film did not release in the United States until May 17, 2013) While the film did not earn as much in the North American box office as its predecessor, internationally, in terms of box office receipts, Into Darkness is the most successful of the franchise. The thirteenth film, Star Trek Beyond, was released on July 22, 2016. The film had many pre-production problems and its script was rewritten several times. Despite receiving positive reviews from critics, Star Trek Beyond underperformed at the box office.

=== Expansion of the Star Trek Universe (2017–present) ===
CBS turned down several proposals in the mid-2000s to restart the franchise on the small screen. Proposals included pitches from film director Bryan Singer, Babylon 5 creator J. Michael Straczynski, and Trek actors Jonathan Frakes and William Shatner. While CBS was not creating new Star Trek for network television, the ease of access to Star Trek content on new streaming services such as Netflix and Amazon Prime Video introduced a new set of fans to the franchise. CBS eventually sought to capitalize on this trend, and brought the franchise back to the small screen with the series Star Trek: Discovery to help launch and draw subscribers to its streaming service CBS All Access. Discovery's first season premiered on September 24, 2017. While the first three seasons of the show are shown in the United States exclusively on the service, which changed its name to Paramount+, Netflix, in exchange for funding the production costs of the show, owned the international screening rights for the show. This Netflix distribution and production deal ended right before the fourth season premiere of Discovery in November 2021.

The Starfleet emblem is inspired by the chevron, which is broadly used in aeronautics, and particularly by the insignia of NASA.

In June 2018, after becoming sole showrunner of Discovery, Kurtzman signed a five-year overall deal with CBS Television Studios to expand the Star Trek franchise beyond Discovery to several new series, miniseries, and animated series. Kurtzman wanted to "open this world up" and create multiple series set in the same universe but with their own "unique storytelling and distinct cinematic feel", an approach that he compared to the Marvel Cinematic Universe. However, the franchise would not tell a single story across multiple series, allowing audiences to watch each series without having to see all of the others. CBS and Kurtzman refer to this expanded franchise as the Star Trek Universe.

The second series of the expansion of the Star Trek Universe, Star Trek: Picard, features Patrick Stewart reprising the character Jean-Luc Picard from The Next Generation. Picard premiered on CBS All Access on January 23, 2020. Unlike Discovery, Amazon Prime Video streams Picard internationally. CBS has also released two seasons of Star Trek: Short Treks, a series of standalone mini-episodes which air between Discovery and Picard seasons. A new live-action series, Star Trek: Strange New Worlds, a spinoff of the second season of Discovery and prequel to the original series, premiered on May 5, 2022. Lower Decks, an animated adult comedy series, was released on August 6, 2020, on CBS All Access. Another animated series, Star Trek: Prodigy, premiered on the rebranded service Paramount+ first on October 28, 2021, and on December 17, 2021, on Nickelodeon. Prodigy is the first Star Trek series to specifically target younger audiences, and is the franchise's first fully computer animated series. Star Trek's television presence would reach a new peak in 2022, with five Star Trek series airing simultaneously that year. (Note: While 2022 had the most Star Trek series, each series had fewer episodes per season, resulting in less episodes per year than when TNG, DS9 and Voyager where airing together.)

The Star Trek: Picard series finale aired in April 2023. Discovery's series finale aired in May 2024. A Star Trek: Starfleet Academy series served as one of these series. Star Trek: Prodigy was removed from Paramount+ in June 2023. The series was picked up by Netflix, and season 1 was made available on December 25, 2023. A second season aired later in 2024.

Paramount was also planning to create television films for Paramount+ every two years. The first of these movies, Section 31, stars Michelle Yeoh, reprising her role as Empress Georgiou from Discovery, and was given a release date of January 24, 2025.

== Television series ==
Thirteen television series make up the Star Trek franchise: The Original Series, The Animated Series, The Next Generation, Deep Space Nine, Voyager, Enterprise, Discovery, Short Treks, Picard, Lower Decks, Prodigy, Strange New Worlds, and Starfleet Academy. All series in total amount to 970 episodes across 52 seasons of television. (Note: The episode count includes all completed and released episodes. The count also includes the Original Series's unaired pilot, "The Cage". Multi-part episodes not originally broadcast as one presentation are counted individually. Ten feature-length episodes are counted as two episodes each, as they were split for foreign broadcast and syndication.)

Series	Seasons	Episodes	Originally released	Network
The Original Series	3	79	September 8, 1966 – June 3, 1969	NBC
The Animated Series	2	22	September 8, 1973 – October 12, 1974	NBC
The Next Generation	7	178	September 28, 1987 – May 23, 1994	Syndication
Deep Space Nine	7	176	January 4, 1993 – May 31, 1999	Syndication
Voyager	7	172	January 16, 1995 – May 23, 2001	UPN
Enterprise	4	98	September 26, 2001 – May 13, 2005	UPN
Discovery	5	65	September 24, 2017 – May 30, 2024	CBS All Access / Paramount+
Short Treks	2	10	October 4, 2018 – January 9, 2020	CBS All Access / Paramount+
Picard	3	30	January 23, 2020 – April 20, 2023	CBS All Access / Paramount+
Lower Decks	5	50	August 6, 2020 – December 19, 2024	CBS All Access / Paramount+
Prodigy	2	40	October 28, 2021 – July 1, 2024	Paramount+ / Netflix
Strange New Worlds	4	40	May 5, 2022 – present	Paramount+
Starfleet Academy	1	10	January 15, 2026 – present	Paramount+

== Films ==
Paramount Pictures has produced fourteen Star Trek films. The first six films continue the adventures of the cast of the Original Series; the seventh film, Generations, was intended as a transition from original cast to the cast of the Next Generation; the next three films focused completely on the Next Generation cast. (Note: Film titles of the North American and UK releases of the films no longer contained the number of the film following the sixth film (the sixth was Star Trek VI: The Undiscovered Country but the seventh was Star Trek Generations). However, European releases continued using numbers in the film titles until Nemesis.) The eleventh film was widely considered to be a reboot of the franchise, despite being a continuation set in an alternate timeline known as the "Kelvin Timeline". Additionally, streaming service Paramount+ has released a television film, Star Trek: Section 31.

Star Trek films
Film	U.S. release date	Directed by	Screenplay by	Story by	Produced by
The Original Series
Star Trek: The Motion Picture	December 7, 1979	Robert Wise	Harold Livingston	Alan Dean Foster	Gene Roddenberry
Star Trek II: The Wrath of Khan	June 4, 1982	Nicholas Meyer	Jack B. Sowards	Harve Bennett and Jack B. Sowards	Robert Sallin
Star Trek III: The Search for Spock	June 1, 1984	Leonard Nimoy	Harve Bennett	Harve Bennett	Harve Bennett
Star Trek IV: The Voyage Home	November 26, 1986	Leonard Nimoy	Steve Meerson, Peter Krikes, Nicholas Meyer and Harve Bennett	Harve Bennett and Leonard Nimoy	Harve Bennett
Star Trek V: The Final Frontier	June 9, 1989	William Shatner	David Loughery	William Shatner, Harve Bennett and David Loughery	Harve Bennett
Star Trek VI: The Undiscovered Country	December 6, 1991	Nicholas Meyer	Nicholas Meyer and Denny Martin Flinn	Leonard Nimoy, Lawrence Konner and Mark Rosenthal	Ralph Winter and Steven-Charles Jaffe
The Next Generation
Star Trek Generations	November 18, 1994	David Carson	Ronald D. Moore and Brannon Braga	Rick Berman, Brannon Braga and Ronald D. Moore	Rick Berman
Star Trek: First Contact	November 22, 1996	Jonathan Frakes	Brannon Braga and Ronald D. Moore	Rick Berman, Brannon Braga and Ronald D. Moore	Rick Berman
Star Trek: Insurrection	December 11, 1998	Jonathan Frakes	Michael Piller	Rick Berman and Michael Piller	Rick Berman
Star Trek: Nemesis	December 13, 2002	Stuart Baird	John Logan	John Logan, Rick Berman and Brent Spiner	Rick Berman
Reboot (Kelvin Timeline)
Star Trek	May 8, 2009	J. J. Abrams	Roberto Orci & Alex Kurtzman	Roberto Orci & Alex Kurtzman	J. J. Abrams and Damon Lindelof
Star Trek Into Darkness	May 17, 2013	J. J. Abrams	Roberto Orci, Alex Kurtzman & Damon Lindelof	Roberto Orci, Alex Kurtzman & Damon Lindelof	J. J. Abrams, Bryan Burk, Damon Lindelof, Alex Kurtzman and Roberto Orci
Star Trek Beyond	July 22, 2016	Justin Lin	Simon Pegg & Doug Jung	Simon Pegg & Doug Jung	J. J. Abrams, Roberto Orci, Lindsey Weber and Justin Lin
Television films
Star Trek: Section 31	January 24, 2025	Olatunde Osunsanmi	Craig Sweeny	Bo Yeon Kim and Erika Lippoldt	N/A

== Audio drama series ==
In May 2022, Alex Kurtzman said there were discussions about expanding the Star Trek Universe to dramatic podcasts. The next month, Nicholas Meyer said he was negotiating a deal to make a podcast based on a television series he had planned about Khan Noonien Singh before the events of Star Trek II: The Wrath of Khan. The project was confirmed in February 2025 as an audio drama series titled Star Trek: Khan. It was released from September to November 2025.

== YouTube series ==
The animated preschool web series Star Trek: Scouts premiered on September 8, 2025, as part of the franchise's 60th anniversary celebrations. Developed by Nickelodeon Digital Studio in partnership with CBS Studios, the show follows three young friends—JR, Sprocket, and Roo—as they train to become future Starfleet explorers in short-form episodes running approximately three to four minutes each. The first two episodes were released on YouTube on September 8 and 9, 2025, while the full 20-episode season is expected in 2026.

== Merchandise ==
Many licensed products are based on the Star Trek franchise. Merchandising is very lucrative for both studio and actors; by 1986 Nimoy had earned more than $500,000 from royalties. Products include novels, comic books, video games, and other materials, which are generally considered non-canon. Star Trek merchandise generated $4 billion for Paramount by 2000. In 2024, The Nacelle Company acquired the rights to make Star Trek action figures for the 60th anniversary of the original series. The action figures will start to debut in late 2025 in waves.

=== Books ===
Since 1967, hundreds of original novels, short stories, and television and movie adaptations have been published. The first original Star Trek novel was Mission to Horatius by Mack Reynolds, which was published in hardcover by Whitman Books in 1968.

In 1968, Gene Roddenberry cooperated with Stephen Edward Poe, writing as Stephen Whitfield, on the nonfiction book The Making of Star Trek for Ballantine Books.

Among the most recent is the Star Trek Collection of Little Golden Books. Three titles were published by Random House in 2019, a fourth is scheduled for July 2020.

The first publisher of Star Trek fiction aimed at adult readers was Bantam Books. James Blish wrote adaptations of episodes of the original series in twelve volumes from 1967 to 1977; in 1970, he wrote the first original Star Trek novel published by Bantam, Spock Must Die!.

Pocket Books published subsequent Star Trek novels. Prolific Star Trek novelists include Peter David, Diane Carey, Keith DeCandido, J.M. Dillard, Diane Duane, Michael Jan Friedman, and Judith and Garfield Reeves-Stevens. Several actors from the television series have also written or co-written books featuring their respective characters: William Shatner, John de Lancie, Andrew J. Robinson, J. G. Hertzler and Armin Shimerman. Voyager producer Jeri Taylor wrote two novels detailing the personal histories of Voyager characters. Screenplay writers David Gerrold, D. C. Fontana, and Melinda Snodgrass have also penned books.

A 2014 scholarly work Newton Lee discussed the actualization of Star Trek's holodeck in the future by making extensive use of artificial intelligence and cyborgs.

=== Comics ===
Star Trek-based comics have been issued almost continuously since 1967, published by Marvel, DC, Malibu, Wildstorm, and Gold Key, among others. In 2009, Tokyopop produced an anthology of Next Generation-based stories presented in the style of Japanese manga. In 2006, IDW Publishing secured publishing rights to Star Trek comics and issued a prequel to the 2009 film, Star Trek: Countdown. In 2012, IDW published the first volume of Star Trek – The Newspaper Strip, featuring the work of Thomas Warkentin. As of 2020, IDW continues to produce new titles.

=== Games ===
The Star Trek franchise has numerous games in many formats. Beginning in 1967 with a board game based on the original series and continuing through today with online and DVD games, Star Trek games continue to be popular among fans.

Video games based on the series include Star Trek: Legacy, Star Trek Fleet Command, and Star Trek: Conquest. An MMORPG based on Star Trek called Star Trek Online was developed by Cryptic Studios and published by Perfect World. It is set during the Next Generation era, about 30 years after the events of Star Trek: Nemesis. The most recent video game was set in the alternate timeline from Abrams's Star Trek. On April 23, 2023, Star Trek: Resurgence, a narrative adventure video game set in the Next Generation era, was released by Dramatic Labs.

=== Magazines ===
Star Trek has led directly or indirectly to the creation of a number of magazines which focus either on science fiction or specifically on Star Trek. Starlog was a magazine which was founded in the 1970s. Initially, its focus was on Star Trek actors, but then it expanded its scope. Star Trek: The Magazine was a magazine published in the U.S. that ceased publication in 2003. Star Trek Magazine, originally published as Star Trek Monthly by Titan Magazines for the United Kingdom market, began in February 1995. The magazine has since expanded to worldwide distribution under the name Star Trek Explorer.

Other magazines through the years included professional, as well as magazines published by fans, or fanzines.

== Cultural impact ==
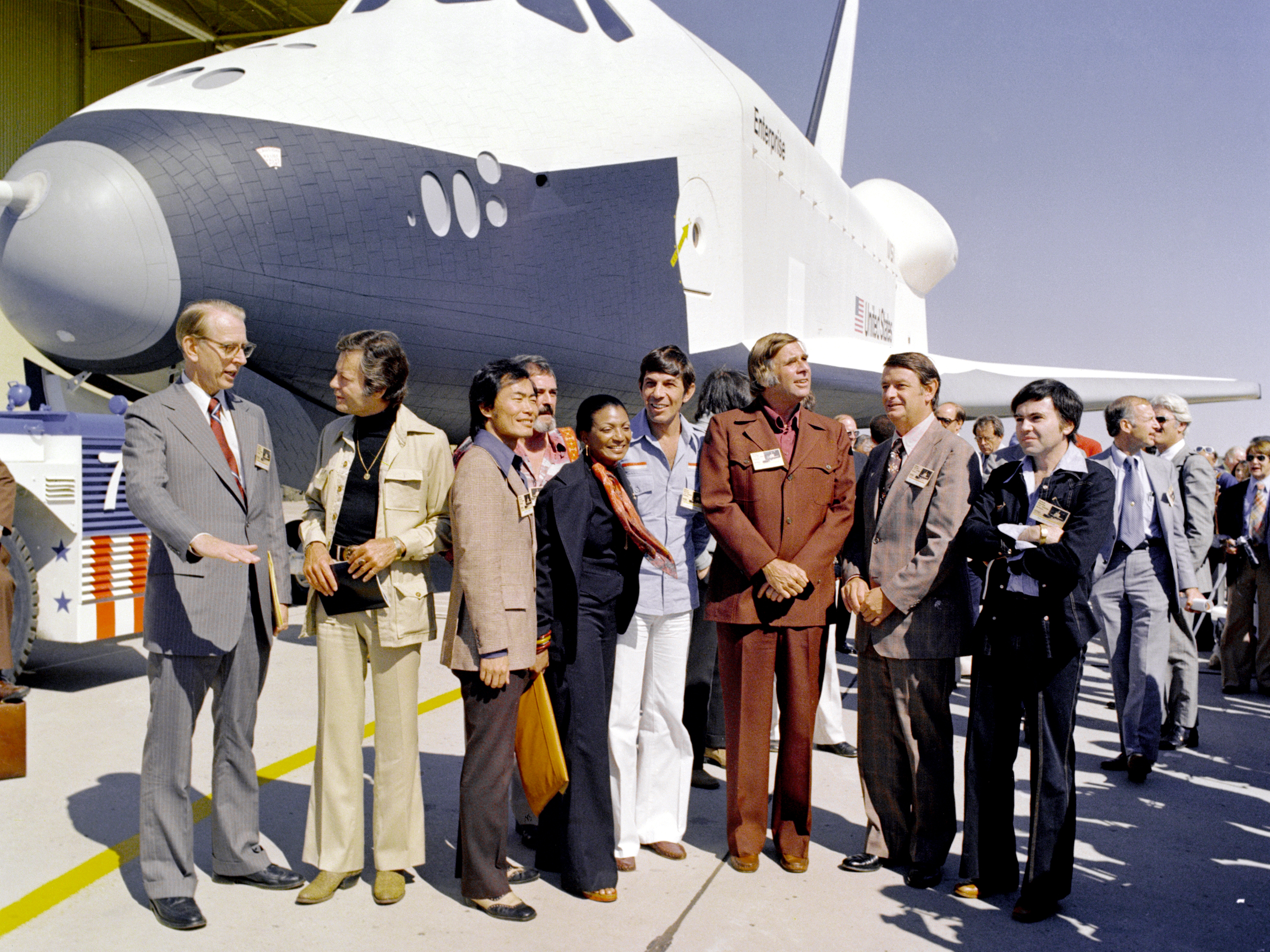
Testbed Space Shuttle Enterprise, named after the fictional starship with Star Trek television cast members and creator Gene Roddenberry in 1976

The Star Trek media franchise is a multibillion-dollar industry, owned by Paramount Global. Gene Roddenberry sold Star Trek to NBC as a classic adventure drama; he pitched the show as "Wagon Train to the Stars" and as Horatio Hornblower in Space. The opening line, "to boldly go where no man has gone before", was taken almost verbatim from a U.S. White House booklet on space produced after the Sputnik flight in 1957.

Star Trek and its spin-offs have proven highly popular in syndication and was broadcast worldwide. The show's cultural impact goes far beyond its longevity and profitability. Star Trek conventions have become popular among its fans, who call themselves "trekkies" or "trekkers". An entire subculture has grown up around the franchise, which was documented in the film Trekkies. Star Trek was ranked most popular cult show by TV Guide. The franchise has also garnered many comparisons of the Star Wars franchise being rivals in the science fiction genre with many fans and scholars.

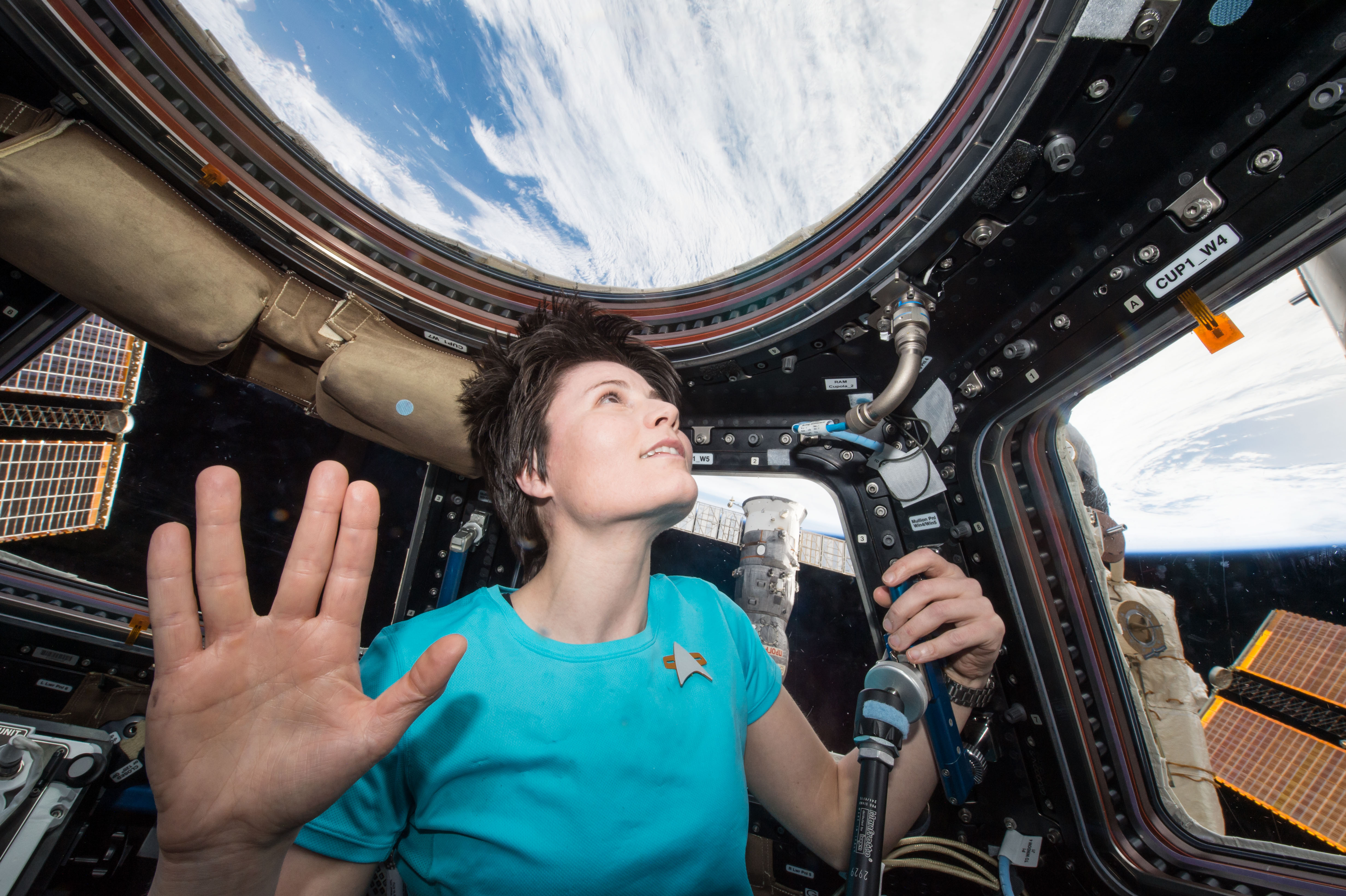
ISS-42 astronaut Samantha Cristoforetti pays tribute to actor Leonard Nimoy, with a Vulcan salute in 2015 from space.

The Star Trek franchise inspired some designers of technologies, the Palm PDA and the handheld mobile phone. Michael Jones, Chief technologist of Google Earth, has cited the tricorder's mapping capability as one inspiration in the development of Keyhole/Google Earth. The Tricorder X Prize, a contest to build a medical tricorder device was announced in 2012. Ten finalists were selected in 2014, and the winner was to be selected in January 2016. However, no team managed to reach all the required criteria; smaller prizes were given to three of the finalists. Star Trek also brought teleportation to popular attention with its depiction of "matter-energy transport", with the famously misquoted phrase "Beam me up, Scotty" entering the vernacular. The Star Trek replicator is credited in the scientific literature with inspiring the field of diatom nanotechnology. In 1976, following a letter-writing campaign, NASA named its prototype Space Shuttle Enterprise, after the fictional starship. Later, the introductory sequence to Star Trek: Enterprise included footage of this shuttle which, along with images of a naval sailing vessel called Enterprise, depicted the advancement of human transportation technology.

Beyond Star Trek's fictional innovations, its contributions to television history included a multicultural and multiracial cast. While more common in subsequent years, in the 1960s it was controversial to feature an Enterprise crew that included a Japanese helmsman, a Russian navigator, and a black female communications officer. Captain Kirk's and Lt. Uhura's kiss, in the episode "Plato's Stepchildren", was also daring, and is often mis-cited as being American television's first scripted, interracial kiss, even though several other interracial kisses (e.g. on The Smothers Brothers Comedy Hour) predated this one. Nichelle Nichols, who played the communications officer, said that the day after she told Roddenberry of her plan to leave the series, she was told a big fan wanted to meet her while attending an NAACP dinner party:

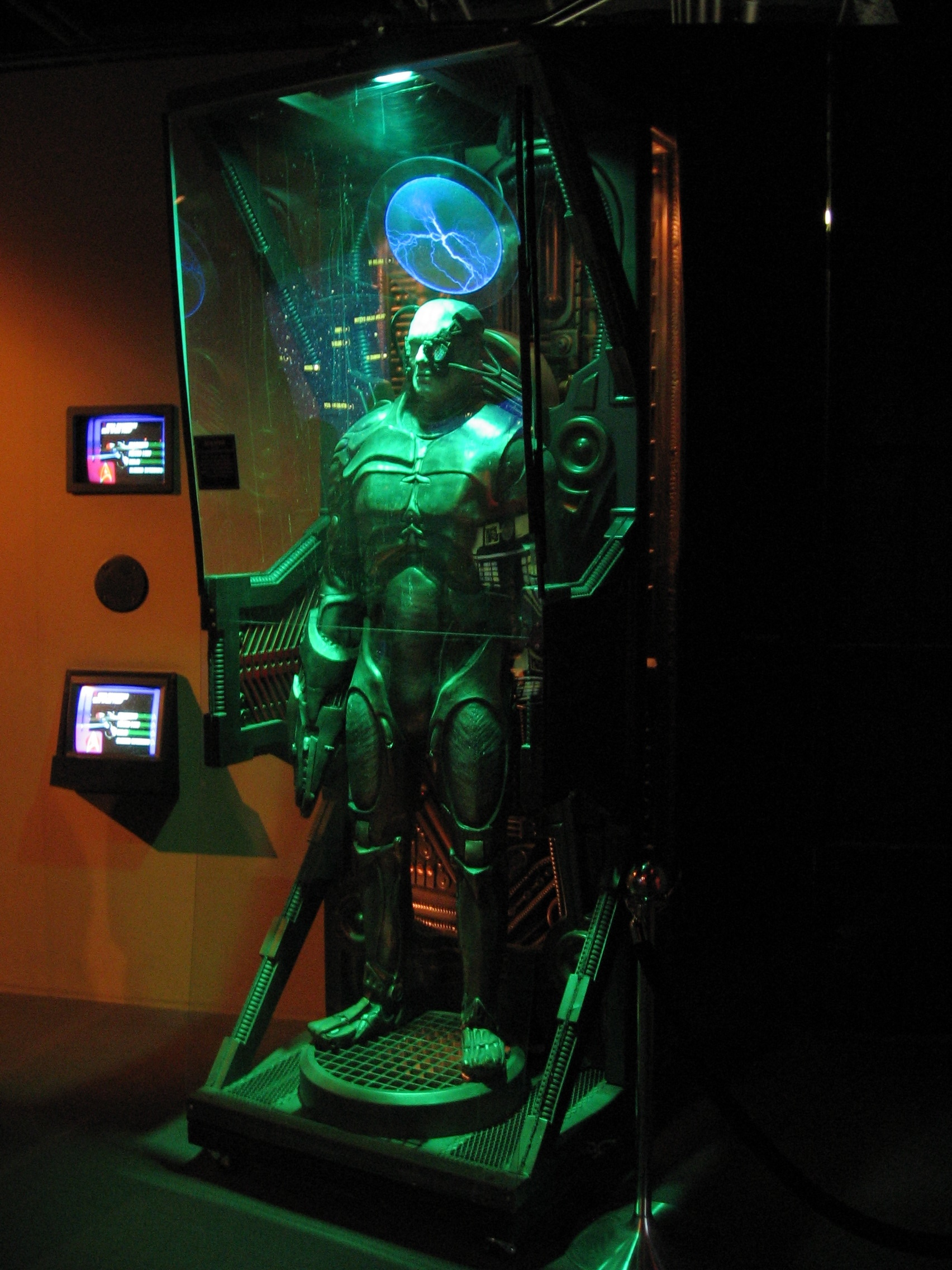
An occupied Borg "alcove" prop on display at the Hollywood Entertainment Museum

I thought it was a Trekkie, and so I said, 'Sure.' I looked across the room, and there was Dr. Martin Luther King Jr. walking towards me with this big grin on his face. He reached out to me and said, 'Yes, Ms. Nichols, I am your greatest fan.' He said that Star Trek was the only show that he, and his wife Coretta, would allow their three little children to stay up and watch. [She told King about her plans to leave the series.] I never got to tell him why, because he said, 'You can't. You're part of history.'

— Nichelle Nichols, Detroit Free Press (2016)

After the show, Nichols used this public standing to speak for women and people of color and against their exclusion from the US human space program; NASA reacted by asking her to find people for its future Space Shuttle program. Nichols proceeded and successfully brought the first non-white people and women into the US space program, working in this quality for NASA from the late 1970s until the late 1980s.

In 2020, the US effort to develop a vaccine to protect against COVID-19 was named Operation Warp Speed, which was suggested by a Star Trek fan, Peter Marks. Marks leads the unit at the Food and Drug Administration which approves vaccines and therapies.

=== Parodies ===
Early parodies of Star Trek included a famous sketch on Saturday Night Live titled "The Last Voyage of the Starship Enterprise", with John Belushi as Kirk, Chevy Chase as Spock and Dan Aykroyd as McCoy. In the 1980s, Saturday Night Live did a sketch with William Shatner reprising his Captain Kirk role in The Restaurant Enterprise, preceded by a sketch in which he played himself at a Trek convention angrily telling fans to "Get a Life", a phrase that has become part of Trek folklore. In Living Color continued the tradition in a sketch where Captain Kirk is played by fellow Canadian Jim Carrey.

A feature-length film that indirectly parodies Star Trek is Galaxy Quest. This film is based on the premise that aliens monitoring the broadcast of an Earth-based television series called Galaxy Quest, modeled heavily on Star Trek, believe that what they are seeing is real. Many Star Trek actors have been quoted saying that Galaxy Quest was a brilliant parody.

Star Trek has been blended with Gilbert and Sullivan at least twice. The North Toronto Players presented a Star Trek adaptation of Gilbert & Sullivan titled H.M.S. Starship Pinafore: The Next Generation in 1991 and an adaptation by Jon Mullich of Gilbert and Sullivan's H.M.S. Pinafore that sets the operetta in the world of Star Trek has played in Los Angeles and was attended by series luminaries Nichelle Nichols, D.C. Fontana and David Gerrold. A similar blend of Gilbert and Sullivan and Star Trek was presented as a benefit concert in San Francisco by the Lamplighters in 2009. The show was titled Star Drek: The Generation After That. It presented an original story with Gilbert and Sullivan melodies.

The Simpsons and Futurama television series and others have had many individual episodes parodying Star Trek or with Trek allusions. Black Mirror's Star Trek parody episode, "USS Callister", won four Emmy Awards, including the Outstanding Television Movie and Writing for a Limited Series, Movie or Drama, and was nominated for three more. A sequel, "USS Callister: Into Infinity", was released on 2025.

In August 2010, the members of the Internal Revenue Service created a Star Trek themed training video for a conference. Revealed to the public in 2013, the spoof along with parodies of other media franchises was cited as an example of the misuse of taxpayer funds in a congressional investigation.

Star Trek has been parodied in several non-English movies, including the German Traumschiff Surprise – Periode 1 which features a gay version of the Original Series bridge crew and a Turkish film that spoofs that same series' episode "The Man Trap" in one of the series of films based on the character Turist Ömer. An entire series of films and novel parodies titled Star Wreck has been created in Finnish.

The Orville is a comedy-drama science fiction television series created by Seth MacFarlane that premiered on September 10, 2017, on Fox. MacFarlane, a longtime fan of the franchise who previously guest-starred on an episode of Enterprise, created the series with a similar look and feel as the Star Trek series. MacFarlane has made references to Star Trek on his animated series Family Guy, where the Next Generation cast guest-starred in the episode "Not All Dogs Go to Heaven".

Other Space is a science fiction comedy streaming series which premiered on Yahoo! Screen on April 14, 2015. Created by Paul Feig, it is set in the 22nd century and follows the dysfunctional crew of an exploratory spaceship who become trapped in an unknown universe.

=== Fan productions ===
Until 2016, Paramount Pictures and CBS permitted fan-produced films and episode-like clips to be produced. Several veteran Star Trek actors and writers participated in many of these productions. Several producers turned to crowdfunding, such as Kickstarter, to help with production and other costs.

Popular productions include: New Voyages (2004–2016) and Star Trek Continues (2013–2017). Additional productions include: Of Gods and Men (2008), originally released as a three-part web series, and Prelude to Axanar. Audio dramatizations such as The Continuing Mission (2007–2016) have also been published by fans.

In 2016, CBS published guidelines which restricted the scope of fan productions, such as limiting the length of episodes or films to fifteen minutes, limiting production budgets to $50,000, and preventing actors and technicians from previous Star Trek productions from participating. A number of highly publicized productions have since been canceled or have gone abeyant.

=== Documentaries ===
Star Trek is a popular subject for documentary films reviewing the history of the franchise. Some examples include:

- Star Trek 25th Anniversary Special (1991) is a 93-minute TV special hosted by William Shatner and Leonard Nimoy, wherein cast, crew, and special guests tell the story thus far, including behind-the-scenes and blooper video.
- Star Trek: A Captain's Log (1994) is a 43-minute television special hosted by William Shatner, with actors from the original series talking about their characters and other aspects of the show, interspersed with scenes from the original series and subsequent films.
- Journey's End: Saga of Star Trek Next Generation (1994) is a 44-minute television special hosted by Jonathon Frakes that reviewed the final season of the series and the upcoming Generations.
- Star Trek: Voyager - Inside the New Adventure (1995) is a 45-minute television special that aired the week before the Voyager premiere. Hosted by Robert Picardo, it goes behind-the-scenes of the series creation and the pilot "Caretaker" with cast and crew interviews.
- Star Trek: 30 Years and Beyond (1996) is a 90-minute television special of an on-stage celebration of Star Trek's 30th anniversary. Presenters include Ted Danson, Ben Stiller, Joan Collins, John Larroquette, several Star Trek actors, and astronauts Buzz Aldrin and Mae Jemison. It features Voyager sketch comedy with Kate Mulgrew and Frasier cast members Peri Gilpin, David Hyde Pierce, Jane Leeves, and John Mahoney, and musical performances by Kenny G and opera singer Jennifer Larmore.
- Inside Star Trek: The Real Story (1998), subtitled "A first hand account - by the insiders", is hosted by Herbert F. Solow, former Head of Television Productions at Desilu Studios. It features interviews with writers, directors, producers, technicians and artists who worked behind the scenes on the original series. It is based upon the 1996 book of the same name that Solow co-wrote with Robert H. Justman.
- Trekkies (1997) explores the subculture of Star Trek fandom.
- Ultimate Trek: Star Trek's Greatest Moments (1999) is a 43-minute Paramount Pictures Corp. retrospective produced and directed by Michael Stevens, hosted by, and starring, Jason Alexander as Captain James T. Kirk with co-stars Dana Gould as Doctor McCoy, and Jay Johnston as Spock. The trio perform comedic sketches to look back at thirty years of Star Trek episodes and films. It aired as a UPN television special on December 1, 1999.
- Star Wars vs. Star Trek: The Rivalry Continues (2001) is a 53-minute episode of Hollywood Rivals produced and directed by Dante J. Pugliese for Passport International Productions. Greg O'Neil narrates, with interviews of the cast, crew and fans from both of the popular franchises. Released on DVD, it is also available on various streaming platforms.
- Trekkies 2 (2004) features fans from around the world, examines the "Trekker" vs "Trekkie" debate, and revisits fans from Trekkies (1997).
- How William Shatner Changed the World (2005, aka How Techies Changed the World with William Shatner) is a two-hour television special hosted by William Shatner that interviews inventors, doctors, professors and others on how Star Trek has changed today's world.
- Star Trek: Beyond the Final Frontier (2007) is a two-hour 40th Anniversary show hosted by Leonard Nimoy, with cast, crew and fan reactions to the franchise and thousands of props identified by Michael and Denise Okuda for auction at Christie's in New York.
- Star Trek: The Captains' Summit (2009) is a 71-minute special filmed for the Star Trek: Original Motion Picture Collection. Whoopi Goldberg hosts a round table discussion with William Shatner, Leonard Nimoy, Patrick Stewart, and Jonathan Frakes about their work on set and how the franchise has affected their lives.
- Bring Back... Star Trek (2009) is an episode of the U.K. Channel 4 series Bring Back... wherein Justin Lee Collins, with help from former Star Trek cast members, recreates the scene from the episode "Arena" in which Captain Kirk battles a Gorn.
- Chaos on the Bridge: The Untold Story Behind Trek's Next Generation (2014) is a 59-minute television special hosted by William Shatner that recalls the struggle to produce and launch Star Trek: The Next Generation with interviews by writers, producers, executives, cast, and crew.
- 50 Years of Star Trek (2016) is an 85-minute retrospective by cast, crew, creators, and critics about the impact of Star Trek from its creation, to the present, and into the future.
- Building Star Trek (2016) is a 92-minute special commemorating the 50th anniversary and the efforts by a conservation team from Smithsonian's National Air and Space Museum to restore and display the 11-foot model of the U.S.S. Enterprise from the original series. It features interviews with astronauts, engineers, writers, and cast.
- The Center Seat (2016), an 85-minute special on Star Trek for its 50th anniversary, aired by the History network.
- For the Love of Spock (2016), focusing on the history and impact of the character Spock.
- The Roddenberry Vault (2016) is a Blu-ray release of newly-located footage cut from the original series, taken from film located in personal archives. Three new one-hour documentaries and audio commentaries were produced by specialists Roger Lay, Jr., Michael Okuda, and Denise Okuda. The three documentaries are titled, Inside the Roddenberry Vault, Star Trek: Revisiting a Classic , and Strange New Worlds: Visualizing the Fantastic.
- What We Left Behind: Looking Back at Star Trek: Deep Space Nine (2019) is a two-hour special about the production and legacy of the show.
- The Center Seat: 55 Years of Star Trek (2021) is an eleven-episode documentary series ordered by the cable network History covering the franchise's decades-long history. It is narrated by executive producer Gates McFadden.

Some documentaries have been funded by the community by money raised by crowdfunding. What We Left Behind raised nearly $650,000 in this way, and a planned Voyager documentary, titled To the Journey: Looking Back at Star Trek: Voyager, raised $450,000 in 24 hours.

== Awards and honors ==
Of the various science fiction awards for drama, only the Hugo Award for Best Dramatic Presentation dates back as far as the original series. (Note: Although the Hugo Award is mainly given for print-media science fiction, its "best drama" award is usually given to film or television presentations. The Hugo does not give out awards for best actor, director, or other aspects of film production. Before 2002, films and television series competed for the same Hugo, before the split of the drama award into short drama and long drama.) In 1968, all five nominees for a Hugo Award were individual episodes of Star Trek, as were three of the five nominees in 1967, one of which won. (Note: Other nominees for the 1967 Hugo Award for Best Dramatic Presentation were Fahrenheit 451 and Fantastic Voyage.) The Next Generation won Hugo awards in 1993 and 1995. Nominations have also been received by Deep Space Nine, Enterprise, Discovery, and Lower Decks, as well as several of the Star Trek feature films and, in 2008, an episode of the fan-made series Star Trek: Phase II.

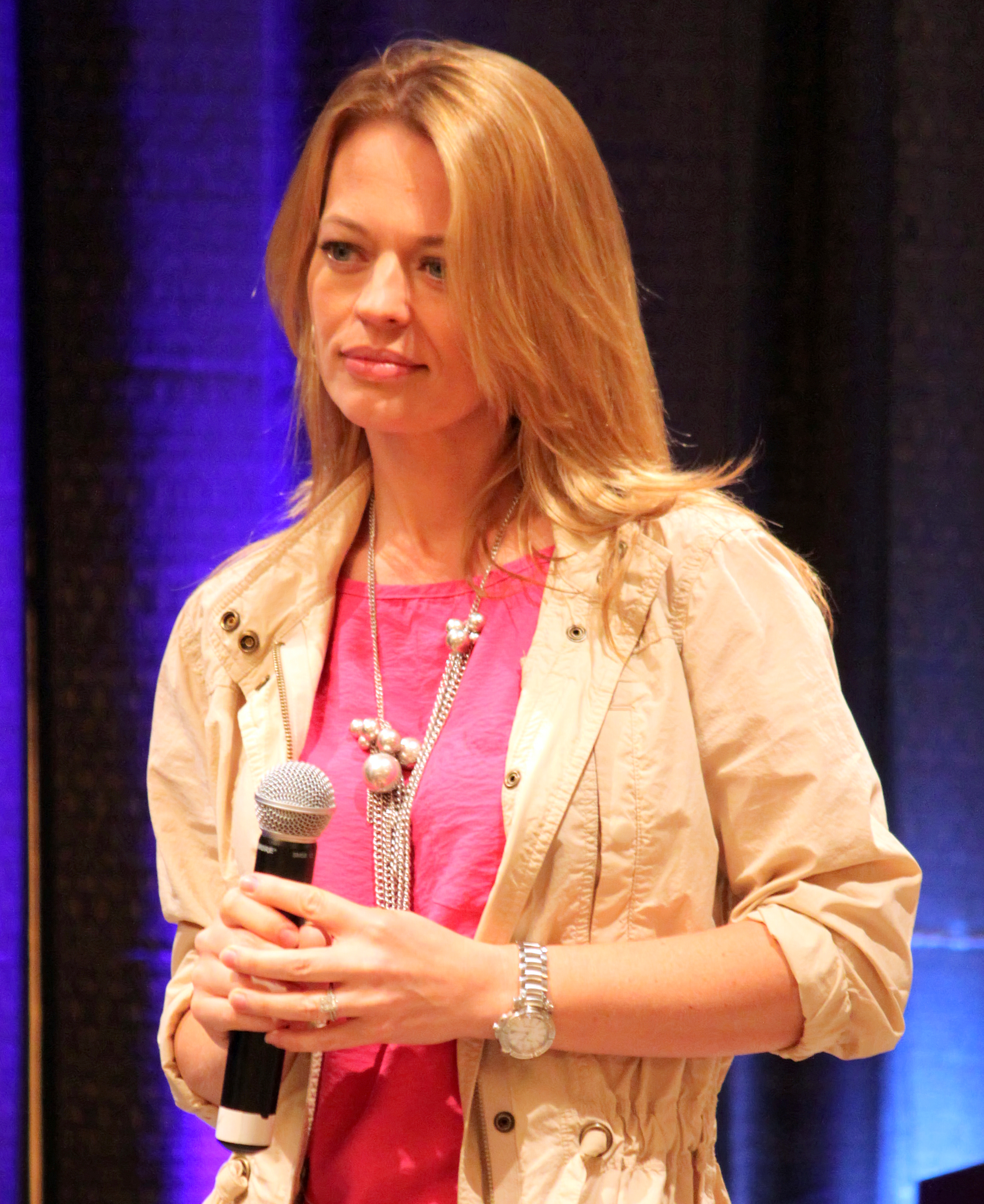
Jeri Ryan, appearing at the Creation Star Trek convention in 2010; she was nominated for three Saturn awards and won for Best Supporting Actress in 2001 and 2024.

One of the most successful films was Star Trek IV: The Voyage Home, which grossed a global total of $133 million against a $21 million budget.The Voyage Home garnered 11 nominations at the 14th annual Saturn Awards, tying Aliens for number of nominations. Nimoy and Shatner were nominated for best actor for their roles, and Catherine Hicks was nominated for best supporting actress. At the 59th Academy Awards, The Voyage Home was nominated for Best Cinematography, Sound (Terry Porter, David J. Hudson, Mel Metcalfe and Gene Cantamessa), Sound Effects Editing, and Original Score.

The episode "The Big Goodbye" in the first season of Star Trek: The Next Generation, in recognition of its "new standard of quality for first-run syndication", the episode was honored with a Peabody Award in 1987. "The Big Goodbye" was also nominated for two Emmy Awards in the categories of Outstanding Cinematography for a Series and Outstanding Costumes for a Series, with costume designer William Ware Theiss winning the award in the latter category.

Star Trek (2009) won the Academy Award for Best Makeup and Hairstyling, the franchise's first Academy Award. In 2016, the franchise was listed in the Guinness World Records as the most successful science fiction television franchise in the world.

In 2024, the entire Star Trek franchise was awarded the Peabody Institutional Award for its enduring body of work and lasting impact on media and society at large.

== Corporate ownership ==
Star Trek began as a joint-production of Norway Productions, owned by Roddenberry, and Desilu, owned by Desi Arnaz and Lucille Ball. The profit-sharing agreement for the series split proceeds between Norway, Desilu (later Paramount Television), William Shatner's production company, and the broadcast network, NBC. However, Star Trek lost money during its initial broadcast, and NBC did not expect to recoup its losses by selling the series into syndication, nor did Paramount. With NBC's approval, Paramount offered its share of the series to Roddenberry sometime in 1970. However, Roddenberry could not raise the $150,000 (equivalent to $1,243,573 in 2025) offered by the studio. Paramount would go on to license the series to television syndicators worldwide. NBC's remaining broadcast and distribution rights eventually returned to Paramount and Roddenberry sometime before 1986, which coincided with the development of what would become The Next Generation.

As for Desilu, the studio was acquired by Gulf+Western. It was then reorganized as the television production division of Paramount Pictures, which Gulf+Western had acquired in 1966. Gulf+Western sold its remaining industrial assets in 1989, renaming itself Paramount Communications. Sometime before 1986, Sumner Redstone had acquired a controlling stake of Viacom via his family's theater chain, National Amusements. Viacom was established in 1952 as a division of CBS responsible for syndicating the network's in-house productions, originally called CBS Films. In 1994, Viacom and Paramount Communications were merged. Viacom then merged with its former parent, CBS Corporation, in 1999. National Amusements and the Redstone family increased their stake in the combined company between 1999 and 2005.

=== Split ownership (2005–2019) ===
In 2005, the Redstone family reorganized Viacom, spinning off the conglomerate's assets as two independent groups: the new Viacom, and the new CBS Corporation. National Amusements and the Redstone family retained approximately 80% ownership of both CBS and Viacom. Star Trek was split between the two entities. The terms of this split were not known. However, CBS held all copyrights, marks, production assets, and film negatives, to all Star Trek television series. CBS also retained the rights to all likenesses, characters, names and settings, and stories, and the right to license Star Trek, and its spin-offs, to merchandisers, and publishers, etc. The rights were exercised via the new CBS Television Studios, which was carved out of the former Paramount Television.

Viacom, which housed Paramount Pictures, retained the feature film library, and exclusive rights to produce new feature films for a limited time. Viacom also retained home video distribution rights for all television series produced before 2005.

Rights and distribution issues, and the fraught relationship between the leadership at CBS, Viacom, and the National Amusements board of directors, resulted in a number of delayed and canceled Star Trek productions between 2005 and 2019. Additionally, the development and release of the new Star Trek film, in 2009, was met with resistance by executives at CBS, as was Into Darkness (2013) and Beyond (2016), which affected merchandising, tie-in media, and promotion for the new films. During this period, both CBS and Viacom continued to list Star Trek as an important asset in their prospectus to investors, and in corporate filings made to the Securities and Exchange Commission.

=== Re-merged current ownership ===
On August 13, 2019, CBS and Viacom boards of directors reached an agreement to reunite the conglomerates as a single entity called ViacomCBS. National Amusements' board of directors approved the merger on October 28, 2019, which was finalized on December 4, bringing the Star Trek franchise back under one roof. ViacomCBS was renamed Paramount Global on February 16, 2022.

=== New ownership ===
On July 7, 2024, Paramount Global's board approved a deal to merge with Skydance Media, the resulting company was being referred to at that time as "New Paramount". After delays due to a series of lawsuits and FCC approval, the merger was completed on August 7, 2025. The merged company was officially named "Paramount, A Skydance Corporation", but was widely referred to as "Paramount Skydance".

== See also ==
- Comparison of Star Trek and Star Wars
- Outline of Star Trek
- Outline of space science fiction franchises
- Timeline of science fiction
