= Star Control: Origins =

2018 video game

- Developer: Stardock Entertainment
- Publisher: Stardock Entertainment
- Producer: Brad Wardell
- Designer: Brad Wardell
- Artists: Akil Dawkins, Paul Boyer
- Writer: Chris Bucholz
- Composers: Riku Nuottajärvi, Dan Nicholson, Mason Fisher, Michael Curran
- Engine: Nitrous
- Platform: Microsoft Windows
- Release: September 20, 2018
- Genre: Action-adventure
- Modes: Single player, multiplayer

Star Control: Origins is an action-adventure game developed and published by Stardock Entertainment for Microsoft Windows, released September 20, 2018 on Steam. It is considered a part of Star Control series, despite taking place in a different time and universe.

== Gameplay ==
Star Control: Origins begins in the year 2088, where the human space agency Star Control launches Earth's first interstellar-capable ship to investigate an alien distress signal. The player assumes the role of the captain of that ship. The game follows the template of original Star Control as an action-adventure game, combining planetary exploration, diplomacy with alien races and ship-to-ship space battles.

The one-on-one "Fleet Battles" take place in a 2D top-down arena of space environment, where two ships fight against each other, having a certain amount of crew (acts as health) and fuel (spent on using unique for each ship primary and secondary abilities). Fleet Battles can be played in the multiplayer mode or against an AI opponent.

Through the game's story, characters, species and events provide quests that direct the player to explore different places in the galaxy. Players can send a planetary lander to explore planets, gather resources and interact with various artifacts or buildings on the surface. Later, the resources can be sold for an in-game value called RU, which is used to purchase new technologies, weapons, upgrades and ships of other races for player's main starship.

== Development ==
Player exploring the environment of Solar System, using their main ship

In 2013, Atari filed for bankruptcy, and auctioned its assets in the dormant Star Control franchise. That summer, Stardock became the highest bidder on the "Star Control" trademark and the copyright in the original material of Star Control 3, though Atari's assets did not include the copyright to other games in the franchise.

Stardock built their game using the Nitrous Engine, with the style of writing and visual art inspired by Star Control II. By 2017, they announced delays and changes in plans, forcing them to cancel their planned Defense of the Ancients-style combat system, while still allowing players to play a public beta of their one-on-one Super Melee system in November. The reported budget for Star Control: Origins was $10 million, with additional costs for marketing and promotion.

In 2014, Stardock initially told Ars Technica that they would create Star Control: Origins as a prequel, taking place 43 years before the events of Star Control. Stardock CEO Brad Wardell sought to involve creators of the original Star Control series. When both Fred Ford and Paul Reiche III declined, the game was set in a separate universe from the original series.

== Reception ==
Reception

Aggregate score
| Aggregator | Score |
|---|---|
| Metacritic | 75/100 |

Review scores
| Publication | Score |
|---|---|
| Destructoid | 90/100 |
| GameSpot | 6/10 |
| IGN | 6.9/10 |
| PC Gamer (US) | 60/100 |
| USgamer | 3.5/5 |

Star Control: Origins has a Metacritic score of 75, indicating "generally favorable reviews". IGN's Dan Stapleton gave Star Control: Origins a review score of 6.9/10 praising the game's combat system and humorous dialogue, but criticizing the repetitive gameplay of planetary resource gathering. Windows Central suggested that "If you enjoy space games, exploring the unknown, establishing communications with potential allies and enemies, as well as shooting stuff out of space, you'll enjoy Star Control: Origins". Stardock reports that Star Control: Origins received 10,000 pre-orders, leading to sales of 50,000 copies after one week of distribution.

== Intellectual property ==
Both Star Control and Star Control II were created by Paul Reiche III and Fred Ford under their Toys for Bob studio, with Accolade publishing the titles in the early 1990s. Reiche and Ford still owned the copyrights in Star Control I and II, but they could not successfully purchase the Star Control trademark, leading them to consider a new title for a potential follow-up. This led them to remake Star Control II as The Ur-Quan Masters, which they released in 2002 as a free download under an open source copyright license.

Meanwhile, the Star Control trademark and copyright for III was transferred to Infogrames Entertainment, part of Atari. Atari declared bankruptcy in 2013, and their assets were listed for auction.

Stardock became the top bidder on Atari's Star Control intellectual property. As Stardock began developing a new Star Control game, they stated that they did not acquire the copyright to the first two games, and that they would need a license from Reiche and Ford to use their content and lore.

Through email, Stardock tried to license character designs from Star Control, but creators Reiche and Ford repeatedly declined, citing a desire to create their own sequel once they finished their ongoing projects with Activision.

In October 2017, Stardock began selling the older Star Control games via the Steam store, as a promotion for Origins. Through email, the parties began to dispute what legal rights Stardock had purchased from Atari, and whether that included distribution rights over the original series. Despite private negotiations, Stardock declined to stop selling the games, leading Reiche and Ford to formally request that Steam remove the original series from their store via a Digital Millennium Copyright Act (DMCA) takedown notice. Stardock formally contested the notice, and the sales continued.

By December 2017, Stardock filed a lawsuit against Reiche and Ford for infringing the Star Control trademark when they announced Ghosts of the Precursors as a "direct sequel" to Star Control II. Soon after, the pair responded with a counter-suit against Stardock for copyright infringement, contesting the re-sale of the original games and the unauthorized use of their original characters and designs.

In June 2019, the parties reached a legal settlement, agreeing that Stardock will own the Star Control trademark, and Reiche and Ford will own The Ur-Quan Masters trademark. Stardock also agreed to avoid using any plots, characters, or locations that would infringe on Reiche and Ford's copyrights, with the parties committing to discuss further disputes. This led to Origins being set in a separate universe from the original series.
