= Pistol Shrimp Games =

Game company

- Founded: April 5, 2022; 4 years ago
- Founders: Fred Ford, Ken Ford, Paul Reiche, Dan Gerstein
- Website: pistolshrimpgames.com

Pistol Shrimp Games is a video game studio created by Fred Ford, Ken Ford, Paul Reiche and Dan Gerstein after leaving Toys for Bob in 2021. The company was created on April 5, 2022.

== History ==
In 2017, Fred Ford, Paul Reiche, Ken Ford and Dan Gerstein decided to start developing Ghosts of the Precursors, the sequel to The Ur-Quan Masters. Due to disagreements between the trademark owner of Star Control and the ownership of the intellectual property within the games previously sold under the trademark, game development was halted. When a settlement was reached, development continued in the fall of 2020.

The main goal of the company was the creation of Free Stars: Children of Infinity, the sequel to the original Star Control game series. The development started in 2021, with the non-official creation of the company. They could not use the name Star Control for a sequel, because the rights to the name belong to Stardock.

The studio was officially created on April 5, 2022. In order to create awareness of the franchise's new name, Pistol Shrimp released The Ur-Quan Masters as Free Stars: The Ur-Quan Masters for free on Steam on February 19, 2024. The company created an engine called Simple for the development of their new game, taking as basis other game engine known as Godot.

Paul Reiche and Ken Ford left Pistol Shrimp summer 2023.
