= Ur-Quan =

Antagonists in the Star Control series

- Star Control character
- The Ur-Quan speaking to the player in The Ur-Quan Masters, the open-source remake of Star Control II
- First game: Star Control (1990)
- Last appearance: The Ur-Quan Masters (2002)
- Created by: Paul Reiche III, Fred Ford
- Voiced by: Larry Zee, David Bryce

In-universe information
- Full name: Ur-Quan Kzer-Za (sub-species), Ur-Quan Kohr-Ah (sub-species)

The Ur-Quan are a fictional race of predatory alien caterpillars in the Star Control series of video games, created by Paul Reiche III and Fred Ford. Introduced in 1990, the Ur-Quan are the primary antagonist of the first game, leading a galactic empire that seeks to enslave Earth. They reprise their role in Star Control II, which expands on their history as former slaves who since vowed to fiercely defend themselves. During the game, the Ur-Quan enter into a civil war over their ideology, giving Earth an opportunity to defeat them. In Star Control 3, which was developed by a different team, the Ur-Quan ally with Earth against a different antagonist and their role is scaled back. They appear once again in The Ur-Quan Masters, the 2002 open source remake of Star Control II.

Reiche and Ford developed the Ur-Quan based on the concepts for unique spaceships in Star Control; their insectoid appearance was inspired by a National Geographic photo of a caterpillar. Their role in Star Control II has earned acclaim among the best game villains in history, praised for their menacing persona, as well as their surprising depth and humanity. The Ur-Quan have also influenced other game studios, inspiring concepts in games such as Mass Effect and Stellaris.

== Description ==
=== Background ===
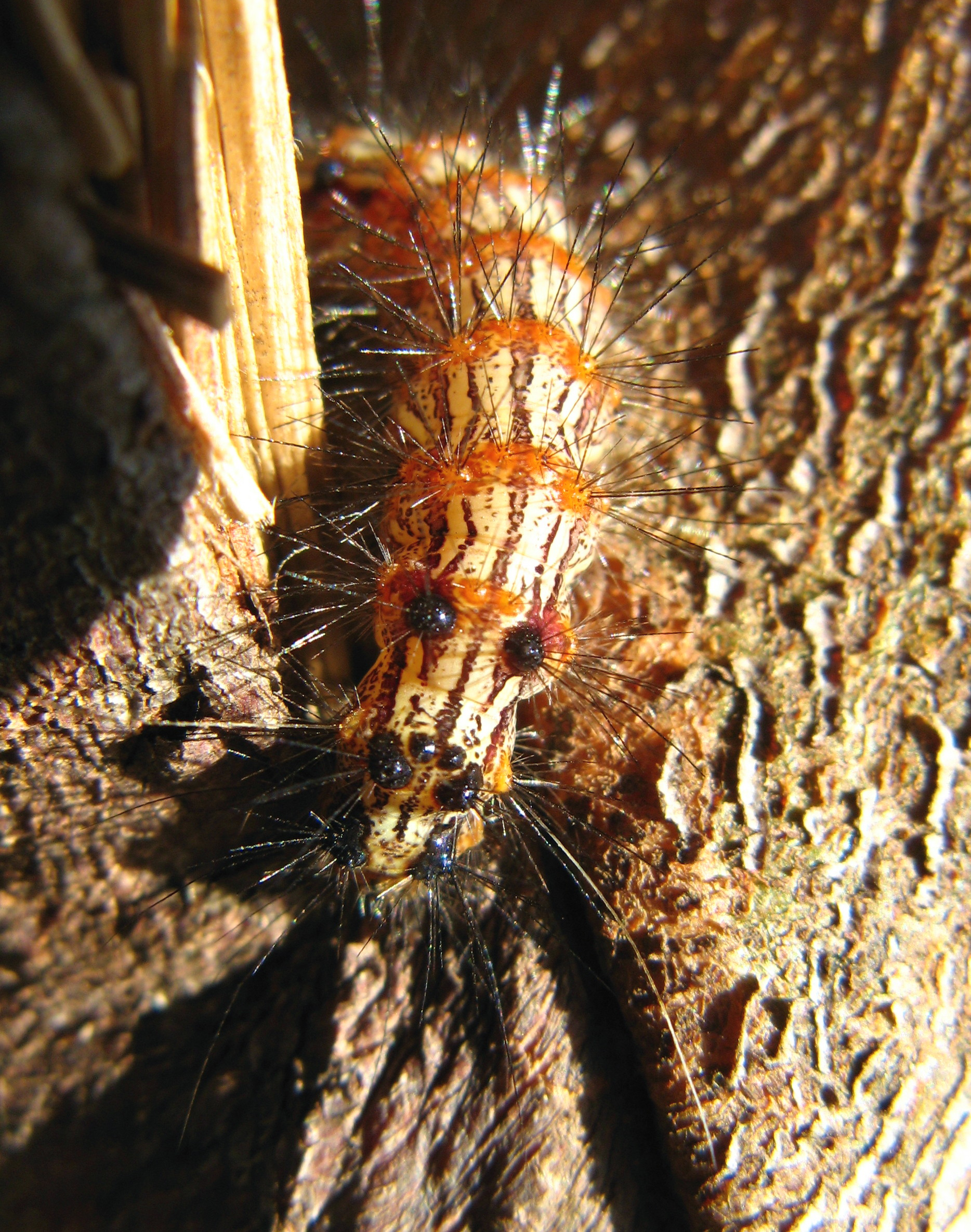
The Ur-Quan's character design was based on insects such as the caterpillar.

The Ur-Quan are fictional characters in the Star Control series of video games, appearing as an alien race of giant predatory caterpillars. Their history is revealed through character dialog, which describes them as a species who evolved on a harsh planet in a distant region of space. Their biological lineage is compared to solitary predators such as the praying mantis, who are naturally limited in their social behaviors. As the Ur-Quan developed intelligence and culture, they were able to master their fierce territorial and hunting instincts, and build a co-operative spacefaring civilization. Eventually, as they began the exploration of their own solar system, they were discovered by an alien race known as the Taalo - members of a loose collection of space faring civilizations known as the Sentient Milieu - and offered membership.

Twenty thousand years before Star Control, Ur-Quan explorers discovered a psychic race called the Dnyarri, who enslaved the Ur-Quan and compelled them to attack and destroy the rest of the Sentient Milieu. Using genetic engineering, the Dnyarri separated the original brown Ur-Quan into two sub-species. The green Ur-Quan became the Dnyarri's favored administrators and researchers, and the black Ur-Quan became their designated soldiers. Many generations later, the Ur-Quan led a successful slave revolt. They discovered they could break the Dnyarri's psychic compulsion by torturing themselves, giving them enough time to kill and eventually exterminate their Dnyarri oppressors.

The Ur-Quan vowed they would never again be slaves, and began to conquer all other intelligent life in the galaxy. The green Ur-Quan were renamed the Ur-Quan Kzer-Za in honor of the Ur-Quan scientist who freed them all. The Kzer-Za moved forward with the 'Path of Now and Forever', a policy of security through enslaving all non-Ur-Quan sentient life, controlling them as either 'battle thralls', or as 'fallow slaves' forever imprisoned on their home worlds under impenetrable force-fields. The Black Ur-Quan, renamed the Ur-Quan Kohr-Ah after their new leader, felt that they could only be safe with the complete annihilation of all non-Ur-Quan life, an ideology they called the 'Eternal Doctrine'. The differing doctrines of the two fiercely territorial species escalated into a civil war. After devastating losses, the Kzer-Za eventually triumphed through the discovery of an enormous ancient battleship created by a lost alien civilization called the Precursors.

=== Appearances ===
The Star Control games are set in the 22nd century, with the player defending humanity from the Ur-Quan Hierarchy, an empire of alien races enslaved by the Ur-Quan. The original Star Control is an action-strategy game, telling a simple story about a war between two alliances, with the Ur-Quan seeking to enslave Earth and its allies. Star Control II greatly expands on the fiction and characters from the first game, allowing the player to learn the Ur-Quan's deeper history and motivations. The sequel begins by revealing that the Ur-Quan succeeded in enslaving their enemies, with planet Earth imprisoned under a Slave Shield. The story slowly reveals that the Ur-Quan are preoccupied with their 'Second Doctrinal Conflict', a civil war to determine who should hold the moral authority to impose their will on the galaxy. At the climax of Star Control II, the Ur-Quan are defeated when a bomb destroys their ancient Precursor battleship. However, Star Control II can also end with the Kohr-Ah faction winning their civil war, allowing them to annihilate every alien race in the region, one-by-one.

The Ur-Quan have a minor role in Star Control 3, which was created by a different development team. The game starts with the Ur-Quan joining an alliance with Earth, but they are ultimately undermined by another civil war with the Kohr-Ah. They are also featured in The Ur-Quan Masters, the official open source remake of Star Control II.

== Concept and creation ==
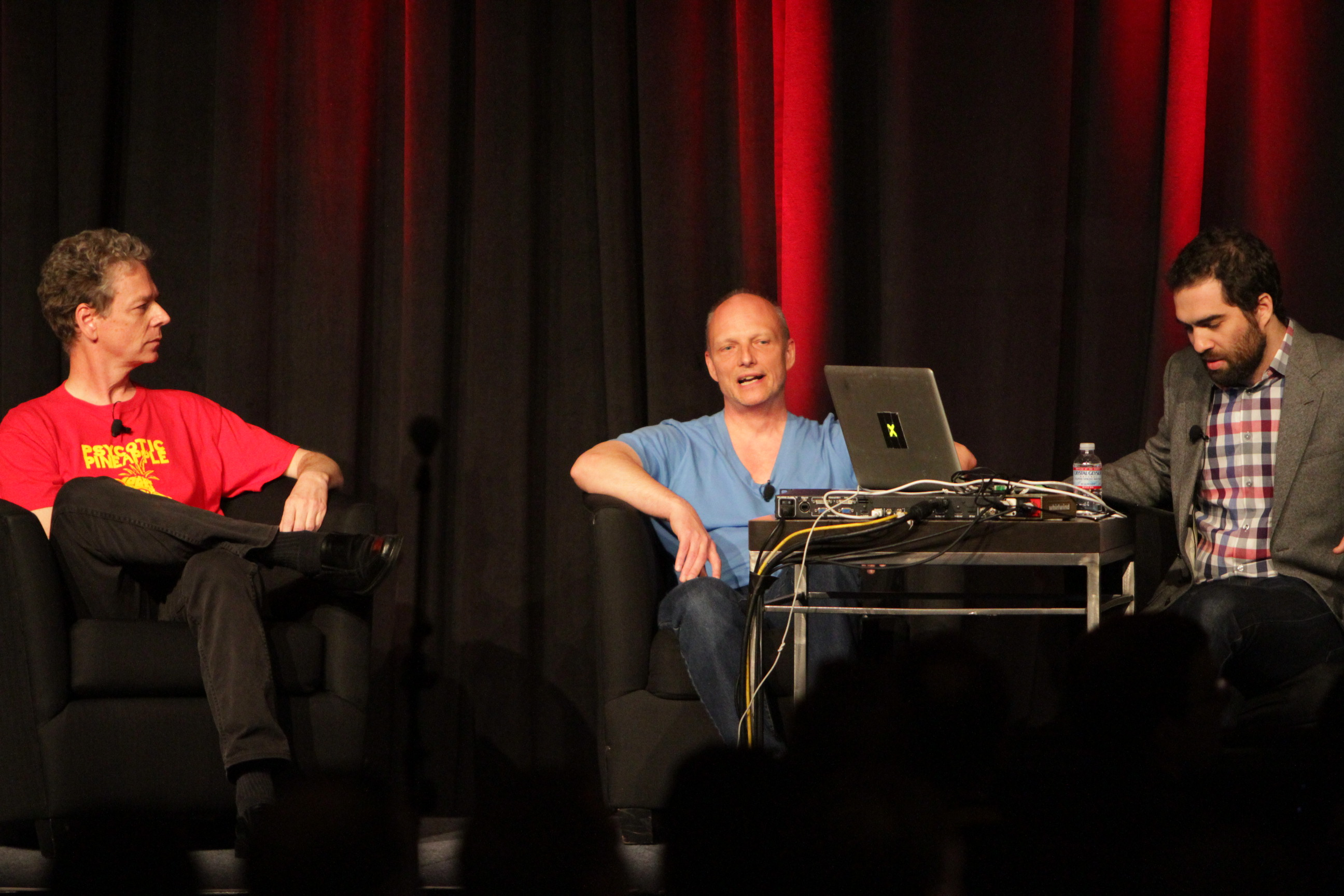
Star Control creators Paul Reiche III (left) and Fred Ford (middle) at the 2015 Game Developers Conference

Creators Paul Reiche III and Fred Ford first conceived of the Ur-Quan for the original Star Control. Reiche and Ford began with paper illustrations, which led them to implement ships with special abilities, with each character concept inspired by each ship's unique look-and-feel. Reiche described their character creation process: "I know it probably sounds weird, but when I design a game like this, I make drawings of the characters and stare at them. I hold little conversations with them. 'What do you guys do?' And they tell me". One large spaceship had the ability to launch fighters, and this ship led the designers to a creative conclusion – since these aliens had command over others, they should be a powerful ancient race that plays the role of the lead antagonist. Reiche and Ford felt that the word "Ur-" had ancient connotations, and liked the sound of "Quan", and thus the Ur-Quan were created.

The first Star Control's story was mainly written in the instruction manual, describing the Ur-Quan as founders of an evil Hierarchy, a "rigid union of the ancient Ur-Quan slavers and their minions". Reiche and Ford wrote the Ur-Quan's motivations for galactic dominance as their desire for slaves. Reiche had previously created a mantis-inspired race called the Thri-Kreen for Advanced Dungeons & Dragons, and the mantis continued to inspire the creation of Star Control's insectoid species. When Reiche saw a National Geographic image of a predatory caterpillar dangling over its prey, this became the basis for the Ur-Quan's appearance.

"We really made a conscious effort to stay away from stereotypes and give every alien race a history that justified their behavior. ... In the Ur-Quan's case, they were under cruel, psychic control themselves for millennia and when they finally broke free the desire never to be in that position again ... overpowered any other mitigating factors".

— Fred Ford, Star Control co-creator, GameSpy Classic Gaming Feature

The origins of Star Control II were motivated by the designers' interest in expanding on the first game's story. As they began writing the new game, Reiche and Ford used the first game's characters to tell simple visual stories about their fictional conflicts. Their intention was to develop aliens who were exaggerations of human flaws, personalities, and cultures. The Ur-Quan were already understood as a race of slavers in Star Control, so the writers developed their motivation by imagining them as former slaves themselves. Reiche attempted to humanize the Ur-Quan, based on his own "relationships with people who had experienced significant childhood abuse and how those traumas produced distinctly odd behaviors in adults. [The Ur-Quan's] doctrines were the overtly crazy but internally reasonable responses to their treatment by the Dnyarri, and the pain they had to endure to win their freedom from slavery". The team describes this writing process as imagining justifications for past creative decisions, building logically on details about the Ur-Quan's history, artwork, and game abilities.

The Ur-Quan theme music for Star Control II was created by fantasy artist Erol Otus, who first composed the song on a synthesizer before it was re-sampled and exported to MOD file format. The 3DO version of Star Control II features the voice of Larry Zee for the Ur-Quan Kzer-Za, and David Bryce for the Ur-Quan Kohr-Ah.

== Reception and legacy ==
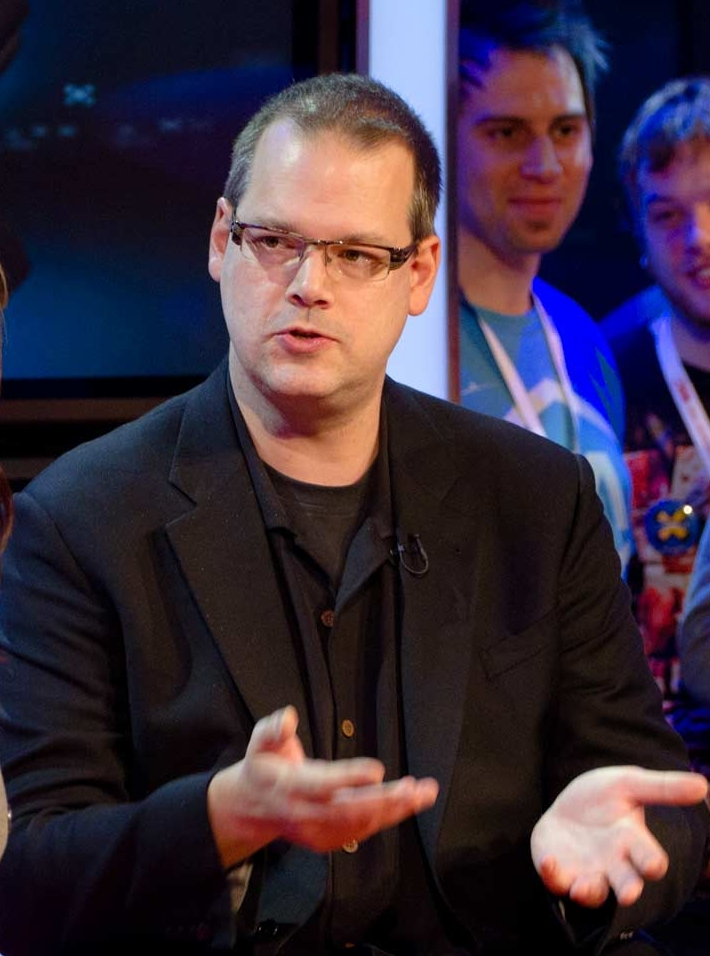
BioWare co-founder Ray Muzyka has cited Star Control as an inspiration, leading journalists to compare the Ur-Quan Kohr-Ah to the Reapers in Mass Effect.

The Ur-Quan have been described as among the best villains in video games. In 1999, GameSpot ranked the Ur-Quan as their best villain in gaming, explaining how their "masochistic and truly sad history makes the Ur-Quan one of the very best villains. Even now, we are hard-pressed to find a race of adversaries as complex and three-dimensional". This mirrored their reader-voted awards, where fans chose them as the fourth greatest game villains. Richard Cobbett of Rock, Paper, Shotgun declared them a "galactic threat better than basically any science fiction role-playing video game that came after", praising the writers for developing the antagonist's motives and justifications. Game historian Rusel DeMaria also proclaimed the Ur-Quan as one of the all-time villainous races in gaming history. The A.V. Club included the Ur-Quan in their 2021 list of best aliens in pop culture, describing them as "tremendous sci-fi villains, importing heady old-school concepts into Star Control’s relentlessly fun space-based action". Noting their overall impact on the game industry, Hardcore Gaming 101 agreed that the Ur-Quan are "rightfully ranked among gaming's greatest villains", as "their terrible history evokes a classic sympathy for the devil, a dramatic moment that many authors only hope to achieve."

The Ur-Quan remain an iconic part of what made Star Control II a success. GameSpot further celebrated the Ur-Quan for their role in Star Control II as one of the best game endings, and GameSpot readers frequently proclaimed their role in one of the best game settings. The Red Bull Gaming channel also highlighted the Ur-Quan's importance to the classic setting of Star Control II. AllGame hailed the game as a "masterpiece" for its story, explaining how "the Ur-Quan, ostensibly the major villains, [...] become more sympathetic than most of the friendly-but-fluttery allies populating your own fleet. This is a rare and praiseworthy design achievement."

In addition, the Ur-Quan have been acclaimed for their music and audio design. Kurt Kalata of Hardcore Gaming 101 described how the music of Star Control II gives each alien race a stronger personality, particularly the Ur-Quan's foreboding theme. This similarly led GameSpot to rank the Star Control II soundtrack as the second greatest of all time, as "these themes were as diverse as the aliens' appearances. Your Green Ur-Quan masters had a commanding, pounding beat, while their more sinister brothers, the Black Ur-Quan, had a more menacing and subtle theme". John Szczepaniak of Retro Gamer praised the Ur-Quan's voice acting and dialog, including the "absolute dread caused by hearing in-depth explanations of what it's like to wear a 'pain excruciator'".

Star Control 3 was developed and written by a different team. Kurt Kalata felt that the game failed to give the Ur-Quan a meaningful role, though he praised their transformation from antagonist to ally. Similarly, Niko Nirvi of Pelit commented that Star Control 3 lacked an enemy as compelling as the Ur-Quan Kohr-Ah.

=== Influence ===
Star Control II has inspired several game studios, where the Ur-Quan have influenced some of the most successful space titles. With several Star Control II fans at Paradox Interactive, their space strategy game Stellaris offers the ability to encase a planet in a slave shield, and references the Ur-Quan's battle thralls as a policy option. Star Control II has also been noted as an influence on Mass Effect writers Mike Laidlaw and Patrick Weekes. The game had an impact on Laidlaw's formative years, and he later praised the Ur-Quan as one of the game's compelling mysteries. BioWare co-founder Ray Muzyka has also credited Star Control as an inspiration for the Mass Effect series. Journalists have since noted the design similarities between the Ur-Quan and Mass Effect's Reapers.
