= Free Stars: Children of Infinity =

Video game by developed by Pistol Shrimp

- Developer: Pistol Shrimp Games
- Publisher: Pistol Shrimp Games
- Designers: Fred Ford; Paul Reiche III; Dan Gerstein; Ken Ford
- Series: Star Control / Free Stars
- Engine: Simple
- Platforms: Microsoft Windows, Linux, macOS, Nintendo Switch, Xbox, PlayStation
- Genres: Adventure, shoot 'em up, action
- Modes: Single player, multiplayer

Free Stars: Children of Infinity is an open world space game, and the upcoming sequel to The Ur-Quan Masters (also known as Free Stars: The Ur-Quan Masters or Star Control II). The game began development in 2021 under Pistol Shrimp, a new studio co-founded by Star Control creators Fred Ford, Paul Reiche, Ken Ford and Dan Gerstein. As the copyright holders of the original story, Reiche and Ford intend to continue the saga from the previous games' events. A demo version, titled "Battles in the Beyond", which includes only a melee game-mode (battles between ships), was launched on September 8, 2026, with showcase trailer published on July 28, 2026.

== Gameplay and plot ==
Similar to the first two games of the series, Free Stars: Children of Infinity features an open-world exploration of space, filled with star systems and planets open to visit. The player lands on different planets, collecting and trading resources and enhancing capabilities of their starship called Mark II, contacts various alien civilisations they encounter in space and fights with hostile ones. Children of Infinity will feature new species and starships (including those made by crowdfunding campaign contributors), together with a new story line, continuing the events of Star Control II .

== Development ==
=== Intellectual property rights ===
Free Stars: Children of Infinity is a sequel to The Ur-Quan Masters (aka Free Stars: The Ur-Quan Masters), the open source remake of Star Control II. Created by Paul Reiche III and Fred Ford at their studio Toys for Bob, the first Star Control was released in 1990, and its sequel followed in 1992. Both games received numerous awards, where Star Control was hailed as one of the best games of all time, while Star Control II earned even more "best game" rankings through the 1990s, 2000s, and 2010s.

In the early 2000s, the copyright to the first two Star Control games reverted to Reiche and Ford, but not the trademark to the name Star Control. This led Reiche and Ford to remake Star Control II as The Ur-Quan Masters, which they released in 2002 as a free download under an open source copyright license. Meanwhile, the trademark in the Star Control name passed between a series of companies, after original publisher Accolade was in acquired by Infogrames Entertainment, which was re-structured and re-branded as Atari, who later sold the trademark to Stardock in a 2013 bankruptcy sale. The respective parties agreed that Reiche and Ford owned the copyright in the games Star Control and Star Control II, while Stardock held the rights to the Star Control name through trademark. After a lawsuit, the parties agreed on the same separation of rights, with Stardock using the Star Control name, while Reiche and Ford maintain the rights to continue the story under an alternate title. As part of the lawsuit settlement, Reiche and Ford agreed to a mandated quiet period.

=== New studio and game ===
In 2021, Fred Ford, Paul Reiche III, Ken Ford and Dan Gerstein co-founded a new game studio called Pistol Shrimp Games, allowing them to begin development on a sequel to The Ur-Quan Masters. and continue the story from Star Control II. In April 2024, they announced that this sequel would be called Free Stars: Children of Infinity, shortly after re-releasing The Ur-Quan Masters under the name Free Stars: The Ur-Quan Masters on February 19, 2024. The debut trailer for Children of Infinity launched on April 4, 2024, on GameSpot, leading to a crowdfunding campaign on Kickstarter on April 16, 2024, which has ended on May 18, 2024, collecting more than $650,000. The game reached its crowdfunding target in less than four hours. Since the game continues the story from Star Control II as envisioned by the original creators, some journalists have called the game "the real Star Control 3”.

During the course of development, Fred Ford created a game development tool called Simple, which was integrated into the open source game engine Godot. In summer 2023, Paul Reiche and Ken Ford finished their work on the project and concluded their involvement with the studio.
