= Star Control =

1990 video game

- Sega Genesis cover art by Boris Vallejo
- Developer: Toys for Bob
- Publisher: Accolade
- Producer: Pam Levins
- Designers: Fred Ford; Paul Reiche III
- Programmers: Fred Ford; Robert Leyland
- Artists: Greg Johnson; Paul Reiche III; Erol Otus
- Composers: Kyle Freeman; Tommy V. Dunbar
- Platforms: Amiga, MS-DOS, Sega Mega Drive/Genesis, Amstrad CPC, Commodore 64, ZX Spectrum
- Release: July 1990 (Amiga, DOS); 1991 (ports)
- Genres: Action, strategy
- Modes: Single player, multiplayer

Star Control: Famous Battles of the Ur-Quan Conflict, Volume IV is an action-strategy video game developed by Toys for Bob and published by Accolade. It was originally released for MS-DOS and Amiga in 1990, followed by ports for the Sega Genesis and additional platforms in 1991. The story is set during an interstellar war between two space alien factions, with humanity joining the Alliance of Free Stars to defeat the invading Ur-Quan Hierarchy. Players can choose to play as either faction, each with seven different alien starships which are used during the game's combat and strategy sections.

The game was created by designer-artist Paul Reiche III and programmer-engineer Fred Ford. Initially, the concept was based on the space combat seen in Spacewar! (1962), combined with the action-strategy gameplay seen in Archon: The Light and the Dark (1983). The alternate title, StarCon, was a play on words referring to Reiche's prior work on Archon, adapted into a science fiction setting. After developing the core space combat system, Reiche and Ford created an assortment of ships, abilities, and character designs. The project was completed with additional artwork from Greg Johnson and Erol Otus.

Star Control was a critical and commercial success upon its release, leading to two sequels, Star Control II in 1992 (and the free open-source remake The Ur-Quan Masters in 2002), and Star Control 3 in 1996. It has since been ranked among the best games of all time by Polygon and VideoGames & Computer Entertainment, remembered for the replay value of its combat, as well as the colorful worldbuilding that gave rise to its acclaimed sequel. Years after its release, game designers have continued to cite Star Control as an influence on their work, including Mass Effect (2007), and Stellaris (2016).

== Gameplay ==
A ZX Spectrum screenshot

Star Control is a combination of a strategy game and real-time one-on-one ship combat game. The ship combat is based on the game Spacewar!, while the turn-based strategy is inspired by Paul Reiche III's 1983 game Archon: The Light and the Dark. Players have the option to play the full game with the turn-based campaign, or practice the one-on-one ship battles. The game can be played by one player against the computer, or two players head to head. The player can also assign the game's artificial intelligence to take over the strategy gameplay, the combat gameplay, or both.

The strategy campaign consists of several selectable scenarios, with nine missions on home computers, and fifteen on the Sega Genesis. Each turn-based strategy mission begins with opposing fleets arranged on a rotating star map, with each player controlling a faction of their choice. Each player has up to three ship actions per turn, which are used to explore new stars and colonize or fortify worlds. These colonies provide resources to the player's ships, such as currency and crew. The goal is to move one's ships across the galaxy, claim planets along the way, and destroy the player's opponent's star base.

When two rival starships meet on the battlefield, an arcade-style combat sequence begins. Each battle takes place on a single screen with an overhead view, zooming in as the two ships approach each other. The battlefield includes a planet as a gravity well, which ships can either crash into, or glide nearby to gain momentum. There are 14 different ships to choose from, with unique abilities for each. Ships typically have a unique firing attack, as well as some kind of secondary ability. For example, the Yehat Terminator has a forcefield, while the VUX Intruder can launch limpets that slow rival ships down. Using these weapons and abilities will consume the ship's battery, which recharges automatically (with few exceptions). Ships also have a limited amount of crew, representing the total damage a ship can take before being destroyed. This ties into the strategic meta-game between combat, where the crew can be replenished at colonies.

The different starships are organized into two warring factions, the Ur-Quan Hierarchy, and the Alliance of Free Stars. Each ship has different strengths and weaknesses, determined by their unique weapons and abilities, as well as their speed, battery, crew (health), and cost. Ship selection has a major influence over combat, and players can discover matchups that give them an advantage. While expensive ships are usually more powerful, the weaker ships can still win in the hands of a skilled player. The screen also displays a cockpit animation for each player, with unique character design for each alien and ship. The ships also have distinct sound design, such as the barking Chenjesu drones, or the Ur-Quan Dreadnaught bellowing "launch fighters" when it initiates a strike.

As was typical of copy protection at the time, Star Control requested a special pass phrase that players found by using a three-ply code wheel, called "Professor Zorq's Instant Etiquette Analyzer".

== Plot ==
Star Control reveals its plot through each scenario in the game's campaign, as well as the game's instruction manual. The story takes place during a war between two interstellar factions of alien species: the peaceful Alliance of Free Stars, and the invading Ur-Quan Hierarchy.

=== Characters ===
The Ur-Quan is the oldest and most advanced species in known space, resembling giant predatory caterpillars with a rigid social order. As slavers, the Ur-Quan recruit other species into their Hierarchy as serfs, which includes their genetically engineered translators, the Talking Pets. The mollusk-like Spathi are cowardly by nature, and were easily coerced into the Hierarchy. The fungoid Mycon joined the Hierarchy freely and fanatically, while the blobbish Umgah joined out of boredom, amused by the war as a great interstellar prank. Two Hierarchy species hold a grudge against Earth, including the humanoid Androsynth who escaped Earth as renegade clones, and the one-eyed VUX, who were insulted by a human during their first contact.

The Chenjesu are the most powerful members of the Alliance, a species of crystalline philosophers who consume electrical energy. Earth joined the Alliance as a multinational crew under their planetary defense organization, Star Control. The Alliance includes the marsupial Shofixti, a brave warrior species who were technologically uplifted by the Yehat, a militant species of avian dinosaurs. The allied Mmrnmhrm are robots with transforming ships, while the Syreen are female humanoids who use their psychic abilities to hypnotize enemy crew. The Arilou are a race of "space elves" with hyper-jump capable vessels, who also have a history of "tormenting" Earth.

Throughout the campaign, each side discovers powerful relics belonging to the Precursors, an unknown lost species who once inhabited nearby space, hundreds of thousands of years ago.

=== Story ===
Humanity encounters a first alien contact near their Ceres outpost, where they receive an urgent warning from the Chenjesu. The crystalline aliens explain that the Ur-Quan Hierarchy is annihilating them and their allies. The Alliance council previously decided that Earth was not strong enough to make a difference, but now the Ur-Quan slavers and their minions have broken through the Alliance defenses, and are approaching the Solar System. The diplomats of Earth agree to join the Alliance, earning a position on the Alliance council, and an Alliance pact to defend Earth and its space colonies.

The campaign begins with a lone Syreen Penetrator vessel attempting to stop the Androsynth from redeploying. The first full battle breaks out where both spheres of influence meet with a mix of combatants, followed by a single Ur-Quan dreadnaught trying to stamp out a fleet of Shofixti scouts. The next encounter takes place in an uncolonized sector between Hierarchy and Alliance starbases. By the fifth and sixth scenarios, the war has escalated to multi-ship battles, including an Ur-Quan armada rampaging towards an Alliance stronghold. The final encounters of the campaign feature a Spathi assault on a Mmrnmhrm mining cluster, and two battles between all members of each faction, with and without starbase support.

The Sega Genesis version features additional scenarios. In neutral space, an Alliance task force attempts to stop the spread of Mycon colonies. Where the Hierarchy has the advantage, they attempt to conquer Earth's surrounding solar system. Meanwhile, a lone Chenjesu Broodhome finds itself outnumbered by a Hierarchy force, while the Hierarchy tries to defend its colonies from an invading fleet of Syreen Penetrators. There are also scenarios that favor the Alliance, where they defend a stronghold against a VUX incursion, and also confront a Hierarchy fleet pressing deep into Alliance territory.

== Development ==
=== Conception ===
The mock-up image that Paul Reiche used to secure a publisher for the game. According to Reiche, "the idea was 3D space combat with the sort of asymmetrical match-ups we'd done with Archon."

Star Control was created by Paul Reiche III and Fred Ford, who both attended the University of California Berkeley around the same time, and both entered the video game industry in the early 1980s. Reiche had started his career working for Dungeons & Dragons publisher TSR, before developing PC games for Free Fall Associates. After releasing World Tour Golf, Reiche created an advertising mock-up for what would become Star Control, showing a dreadnaught and some ships fighting. He pitched the game to Electronic Arts, before instead securing an agreement with Accolade as a publisher, thanks to Reiche's former producer taking a job there. Meanwhile, Ford had started his career creating games for Japanese personal computers before transitioning to more corporate software development. After a few years working at graphics companies in Silicon Valley, Ford realized he missed working in the game industry. At this point, Reiche needed a programmer-engineer and Ford was seeking a designer-artist, so their mutual friends set up a gaming night to re-introduce them. The meeting was hosted at game designer Greg Johnson's house, and one of the friends who encouraged the meeting was fantasy artist Erol Otus.

Star Control began as an evolution of concepts that Reiche created in Archon: The Light and the Dark and Mail Order Monsters. The project would adapt the action-strategy gameplay of Archon into a science fiction setting, where unique combatants fight space battles using distinct abilities. Also called StarCon, the title was a play on words. According to Ford, "StarCon is really just Archon with an S-T in front of it", pointing to the one-on-one combat and strategic modes of both games. Star Control would base its combat sequences on the classic game Spacewar!, as well as the core experience of space combat game Star Raiders.

This was the first collaboration between Ford and Reiche, who decided to limit the game's scope to establish an effective workflow. Releasing the game under their personal names, they also began referring to their partnership as Toys for Bob. Programmer Robert Leyland and artist Erol Otus had both worked with Ford at his previous place of employment, and joined him as he began work on Star Control.

=== Design and production ===
Fred Ford's first prototype was a two-player action game where the VUX and Yehat ships blow up asteroids, which led them to build the entire universe around that simple play experience. Ford designed the Yehat starship with a crescent-shape, and the ship's shield-generator led them to optimize the ship for close combat. They built on these two original ships with many additional ships and character concepts, and play-tested them with friends such as Greg Johnson and Robert Leyland. The team preferred to iterate on ship designs rather than plan them, as they discovered different play-styles during testing. The asymmetry between the combatants became essential to the experience. Ford explained: "Our ships weren't balanced at all, one on one... but the idea was, your fleet of ships, your selection of ships in total was as strong as someone else's, and then, it came down to which matchup did you find". Still, the ships were still given some balance by having their energy recharge at different rates.

Although the story does not factor heavily into the game, the character concepts were created based on the ship designs. The team would begin with paper illustrations, followed by logical abilities for those ships, and a character concept that suited the ship's look-and-feel. The first ship sketches were based on popular science fiction, such as SpaceWar! or Battlestar Galactica, and slowly evolved into original designs as they discussed why the ships were fighting each other. Reiche describes their character creation process: "I know it probably sounds weird, but when I design a game like this, I make drawings of the characters and stare at them. I hold little conversations with them. 'What do you guys do?' And they tell me". By the end of this process, they wrote a short summary for each alien, describing their story and personality.

After creating a large ship that launches fighters on command, Reiche and Ford decided this would be a dominating race. These antagonists would be called the Ur-Quan, with a motivation to dominate the galaxy to hunt for slaves, and an appearance based on a National Geographic image of a predatory caterpillar dangling over its prey. They decided to organize the characters into nominally "good" and "bad" factions, each with seven unique races and ships, with the humans on the good side. As they were creating the alien characters based on the ship abilities, the Spathi's cowardly personality was inspired by their backwards-shooting missiles. A more robotic ship inspired an alien race called the Androsynth, whose appearance was imagined as Devo flying a spaceship. Reiche and Ford were also inspired by character concepts in David Brin's The Uplift War. The designers asked what kind of race would be uplifted by the fiercely heroic Yehat, and decided to create the Shofixti as a ferocious super rodent. The team also decided that the game would need more humanoid characters, and created the Syreen as a powerful and attractive humanoid female race. When they saw that the Syreen ship resembled a cross between a rocket ship and a ribbed condom, Fred Ford suggested calling it the Syreen Penetrator, which coincidentally happened moments before the 1989 San Francisco Earthquake.

The game's file size was largely devoted to sound effects, with audio sampled from famous science fiction media, as well as original sound designs for other alien ships. Each alien race also has a short victory theme song, composed by Reiche's friend Tommy Dunbar of The Rubinoos. The longer Ur-Quan theme played at the end of the game was composed by fantasy artist Erol Otus.

=== Porting and compatibility ===
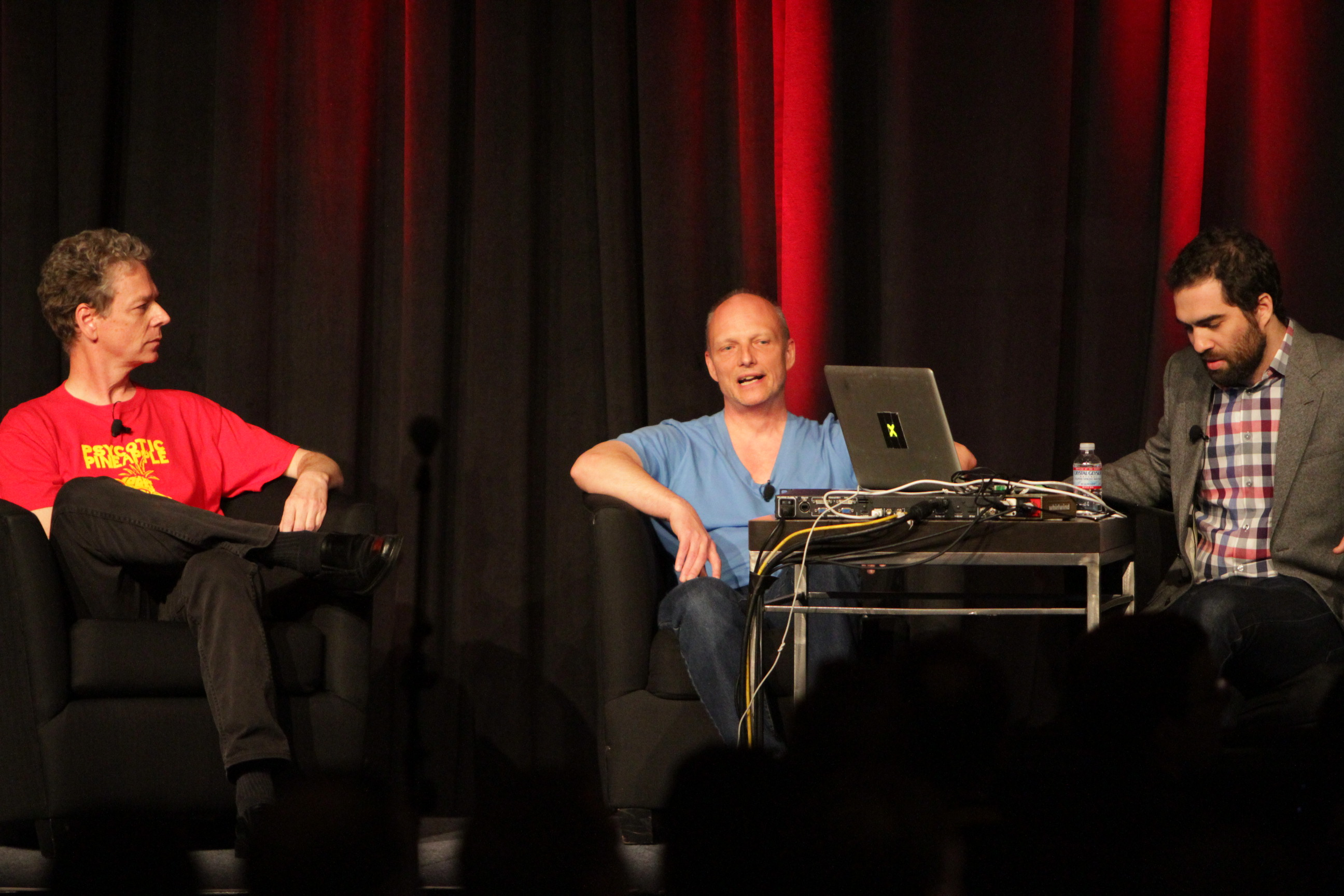
Paul Reiche III, Fred Ford, and Rob Dubbin give a postmortem of the game's development at GDC 2015.

The number of visible colors was a major technological limitation at the time, and the team created different settings for CGA, EGA, and VGA monitors. A separate team ported a stripped down version of the game to the Commodore 64, Amstrad, and ZX Spectrum, which meant reducing the number of ships to eight, as well introducing new bugs and balance issues. Additional problems were caused by the number of simultaneous key-presses required for a multiplayer game, which required Ford to code a solution that would work across multiple different computer keyboards.

Star Control was ported to the Sega Genesis, in a team led by Fred Ford. Because the Genesis port was a cartridge-based game with no battery backup, it lacked the scenario-creator of the PC version, but it came pre-loaded with a few additional scenarios not originally in the game. Where the PC version featured synthesized audio, the team discovered the digital MOD file format to help port the music to console, which would become the core music format for the sequel. It took nearly five months to convert the code and color palettes, leaving little time to optimize the game under Accolade's tight schedule, leading to slowdown issues. Released under Accolade's new "Ballistic" label for high quality games, the game was touted as the first 12-megabit cartridge created for the system. The box art for the Sega version was adapted from the original PC version, this time re-painted by artist Boris Vallejo.

The Genesis port was not authorized by Sega. Frustrated with Sega's licensing requirements, Accolade decided to reverse engineer the console to disable the code that locked out unlicensed games. This allowed Accolade to port several games to the Genesis from their previous list of releases, including Star Control. Sega responded by suing Accolade for copyright infringement, but the appeal court found that reverse engineering was a fair use exception to copying the code without Sega's authorization. The ruling set an influential precedent, allowing other instances of reverse engineering to continue without penalty. Sega eventually settled the lawsuit in Accolade's favor, making them a licensed Sega developer.

== Reception ==
Reception

Review scores
Publication	Score
Computer Gaming World	3.5/5 (PC)
Computer and Video Games	68% (Amiga); 90% (Sega)
MegaTech	90% (Sega)
Sega16	8/10 (Sega)
Videogame & Computer World	8/10 (PC/C64); 9/10 (Amiga)
Entertainment Weekly	B (Sega)
Joystick	75% (Sega)
The Games Machine	88% (PC)
Raze Magazine	70/100 (Sega)

Awards
Publication	Award
Computer and Video Games	CVG Hit
MegaTech	Hyper Game Award
VG&CE	Best Computer Science Fiction Game 1990
Software Publishers Association	Best Action/Arcade Program 1991

Star Control was a commercial success at the time, reaching the top 5 on the PC sales charts by September 1990. According to a retrospective by Finnish gaming magazine Pelit, the game would go on to sell 120,000 copies, leading Accolade to request a sequel from creators Reiche and Ford.

The game earned wide acclaim for its arcade-style combat, including its tactical depth and player-vs-player mode. MegaTech enjoyed mastering the different starships, earning the game an editorial Hyper Game Award as "one of the best two-player Mega Drive games ever". Similarly, Computer and Video Games chose Star Control for their editorial "CVG Hit" award, highlighting the variety of weapons, the fun of learning favorable matchups, and the overall playability of the game's two-player mode. Italian publication The Games Machine celebrated Star Control as a modern re-invention of Spacewar!, recommending the combat mode for its range of options, its automatic camera zoom, and its implementation of physics. Entertainment Weekly also recommended the game for evolving the Spacewar! formula with a variety of unique ships. The arcade combat earned additional praise for its replayability from Computer Gaming World, Digital Press, Videogame & Computer World, and Raze Magazine.

Several publications celebrated Star Control for its artistic details, including its character designs and animations. Digital Press praised the personality of the alien ships for their portraits, and the lore behind each species. Strategy Plus appreciated the unique humor and personality of the aliens, highlighting the design of the Syreen and their Penetrator ship, as well as "silly" names like Chenjesu commander Bzrrak Ktazzz.Videogame & Computer World praised the unique animations of the aliens, while Strategy Plus declared the game's graphics as "truly spectacular in 256 color VGA". The Games Machine celebrated the game's many graphical details, particularly the alien pilots. French publication Joystick offered its strongest praise for the game's art and environment. The game's audio design was also highlighted by several publications. Digital Press felt that the sound effects for the Ur-Quan and Chenjesu gave their ships a "fantastic" personality, while Computer and Video Games praised the audio for drawing on popular science fiction.

Several reviewers were more critical of the game's strategic mode. Computer Gaming World found that it lacked depth, and Joystick compared the strategy sections unfavorably to the game's combat. Entertainment Weekly criticized the star map as difficult to see, while Raze Magazine found it tedious to operate the strategy game menus on the Sega Genesis.

Originally released for the PC, Star Control received criticism for its porting to other platforms. Advanced Computer Entertainment called the Amiga version "disappointing", denouncing the load times and "tacky two-dimensional combat sequences that look as if they've been borrowed from an early Eighties coin-op". Computer and Video Games similarly compared the Amiga version of Star Control to the "aging co-op Spacewar!". While reviewing the Sega Genesis version, Computer and Video Games described the graphics as inferior to other titles on the console. Raze Magazine felt that it lacked the polish and depth of the original PC version, criticizing the sprites and environments, while still offering praise for the detailed portraits.

The year of the game's release, Video Games & Computer Entertainment gave Star Control an award for "Best Computer Science Fiction Game", noting that "the two creators have put together a game that is great either as a full simulation or an action-combat contest". They later highlighted the game in a list of science fiction releases, proclaiming "Reiche and Ford's action-strategy tour de force is one of the most absorbing and challenging science fiction games of all-time". The game was additionally nominated for Best Action/Arcade Program at the 1991 Spring Symposium of the Software Publishers Association.

=== Legacy and impact ===
Star Control has been received several retrospective awards from gaming publications. In 1996, Video Games & Computer Entertainment ranked it as the 127th best game, describing it as "Space War enters the 90s with a touch of humor". In 2001, PC Gameplay ranked Star Control as the 45th most influential game of all time, based on a survey of dozens of game studios. In 2017, Polygon ranked it as number 253 in their top 500 games of all time, arguing that "as a melee or strategic game, it helped define the idea that games can be malleable and dynamic and players can make an experience wholly their own". Journalist Jamie Lendino also noted Star Control among the most significant PC games of the early 1990s, for successfully combining an action game with science fiction strategy. The game is also celebrated for the debut of the Ur-Quan, as "one of the all-time villainous races in the history of computer games".

Years after its release, Pelit recalled the original Star Control for its polished combat system, as well as the creativity of its character designs. In 2005, Retro Gamer described Star Control as "a textbook example of good game design", where "two genres were brilliantly combined, making for a finely balanced and well-rounded game experience". The publication further highlighted the many "elements that gave Star Control 'soul'", describing it as "the seed from which the vastly expanded narrative found in Star Control II grew". IGN celebrated Star Control as a "special game" for "its colorful universe and superb combat system", which laid the foundation for its acclaimed sequel Star Control II. In a retrospective, Hardcore Gaming 101 attributed the game's legacy to its combat system, and the story and characters that would be further developed in the sequel.

Founder of BioWare, Ray Muzyka, has cited the original Star Control as an inspiration for the Mass Effect series of games, stating that "the uncharted worlds in Mass Effect comes from imagining what a freely explorable universe would be like inside a very realistic next-gen game". Former BioWare writer Mike Laidlaw praised the creativity of the Star Control ship designs, and credited the game with laying the foundation for its sequel, which influenced him as a writer on Mass Effect. Creative producer Henrik Fahraeus has also cited the game's influence on Paradox Interactive's character designs in Stellaris, particularly the bird-like and mushroom-like aliens.

== Sequels and open-source remake ==
=== Star Control II ===
Star Control II is an action-adventure science fiction game, set in an open world. The game was originally published by Accolade in 1992 for MS-DOS, and was later ported to the 3DO with enhanced multimedia elements. Created by Fred Ford and Paul Reiche III, it vastly expands on the story and characters introduced in the first game. When the player discovers that Earth has been encased in a slave shield, they must recruit allies to liberate the galaxy. The game features ship-to-ship combat based on the original Star Control, but removes the first game's strategy elements to focus on story and dialog. Star Control II has earned critical acclaim and is considered one of the best games of all time through the 1990s, 2000s, and 2010s. It is also ranked among the best games in several creative areas, including writing, world design, character design, and music.

=== Star Control 3 ===
Star Control 3 is an adventure science fiction video game developed by Legend Entertainment, and published by Accolade in 1996. The story takes place after the events of Star Control II when the player must travel deeper into the galaxy to investigate the mysterious collapse of hyperspace. Several game systems from Star Control II are changed. Hyperspace navigation is replaced with instant fast travel, and planet landing is replaced with a colony system inspired by the original Star Control. Accolade hired Legend Entertainment to develop the game after original creators Paul Reiche III and Fred Ford decided to pursue other projects. Though the game was considered a critical and commercial success upon release, it would receive unfavourable comparisons to Star Control II, with some fans regarding it as non-canonical.

=== Cancelled Star Control 4 ===
In January 1998, Accolade announced that they were developing Star Control 4. Also known as StarCon, it was designed as a 3D space combat game. By this time, Electronic Arts had agreed to become the distributor for all games developed by Accolade. Accolade producer George MacDonald announced that "we want to move away from the adventure element and concentrate on what it seems the players really want – action!" Though heavier on combat than previous titles, players would still have the opportunity to fly to planets and communicate with different aliens. The team also created a Star Control History Compendium, to help them resolve storylines from the previous games. In a playable alpha version of the game, players could control a fleet carrier, with the ability to launch a fighter that could be controlled by either the same player or a second player. The game was later announced for the PlayStation home console with plans for release in 1999, featuring a 40-hour variable storyline, and both competitive and co-operative multiplayer. Electronic Arts and Accolade promoted the choice of playing as "one of two alliances (Hyperium or Crux)", with the option of operating a fighter, carrier, or turrets. Another publication described the ability to select from three different alien factions, with different missions that impact the storyline, and the ability to destroy entire planets.

Development on the game was halted at the end of 1998. Not satisfied with the game's progress, Accolade put the project on hold with intentions to re-evaluate their plans for the Star Control license. In 1999, Accolade was acquired by Infogrames SA for $50 million, as one of many corporate restructurings that eventually led to Infogrames merging with Atari and re-branding under a revived Atari brand. Star Control 3 became the last official installment of the series.

=== The Ur-Quan Masters ===
By the early 2000s, Accolade's copyright license for Star Control expired, triggered by a contractual clause when the games were no longer generating royalties. As the games were no longer available for sale, Reiche and Ford wanted to keep their work in the public eye, to maintain an audience for a potential sequel. Reiche and Ford still owned the copyrights in Star Control and its sequel Star Control II, but they could not successfully purchase the Star Control trademark from Accolade, leading them to consider a new title for a potential follow-up. This led them to remake Star Control II as The Ur-Quan Masters, which they released in 2002 as a free download under an open source copyright license. The official free release is maintained by an active fan community.

=== Free Stars: Children of Infinity ===
On October 24, 2023, Pistol Shrimp Games developers, consisting of Fred Ford, Paul Reiche III, Ken Ford and Dan Gerstein, announced the new name of the sequel, Free Stars: Children of Infinity, and launched its corresponding website. A Kickstarter campaign was launched on April 16, 2024 to further the game development of the sequel. Within 3 hours, they met their initial $100,000 USD goal. The planned date for the release of the game was August 2025 but has since been delayed to 2026. The fans started to call the game "the real Star Control 3" due to its creation by Reiche and Ford.

== Aftermath ==
Fans continued to demand a new Star Control game well into the 2000s. Reiche and Ford expressed interest in creating either an updated Star Control II or an alternate Star Control 3, particularly if they found the right publisher. During this time, thousands of fans started a petition in hopes of inspiring a sequel. Toys for Bob producer Alex Ness responded in April 2006 with an article on the company website, stating that "if enough of you people out there send me emails requesting that Toys For Bob do a legitimate sequel to Star Control 2, I'll be able to show them to Activision, along with a loaded handgun, and they will finally be convinced to roll the dice on this thing". In the months that followed, Ness announced the petition's impact, reporting that "there did honestly seem to be some real live interest on [Activision's] part. At least on the prototype and concept-test level. This is something we may in fact get to do when we finish our current game". In a 2011 interview about their next game Skylanders: Spyro's Adventure, Reiche declared that they will one day make the real sequel.

=== Intellectual property split ===
By the early 2000s, the Star Control trademark was held by Infogrames Entertainment. Star Control publisher Accolade had sold their company to Infogrames in 1999, who merged with Atari and re-branded under the Atari name in 2003. In September 2007, Atari released an online Flash game with the name Star Control, created by independent game developer Iocaine Studios. Atari ordered the game to be delivered in just four days, which Iocaine produced in two days. Also in September, Atari applied to renew the Star Control trademark with the United States Patent and Trademark Office, citing images of Iocaine's flash game to demonstrate their declaration of use in commerce.

Atari declared bankruptcy in 2013, and their assets were listed for auction. When Stardock became the top bidder for Atari's Star Control assets, Paul Reiche indicated that he still owned the copyrighted materials from the first two Star Control games, which implied that Stardock must have purchased the Star Control trademark and the copyright in any original elements of Star Control 3. Stardock confirmed this intellectual property split soon after. As Stardock began developing their new Star Control: Origins game, they re-iterated that they did not acquire the copyright to the first two games, and that they would need a license from Reiche and Ford to use their content and lore. Reiche and Ford echoed this understanding in their 2015 Game Developers Conference interview, stating that Stardock's game would use the Star Control trademark only. After a lawsuit, the parties agreed on the same separation of rights, with Stardock using the Star Control name, and Reiche and Ford announcing a sequel to The Ur-Quan Masters after a mandated quiet period.
