= Star Control II =

1992 video game

- MS-DOS cover art
- Developer: Toys for Bob
- Publishers: Accolade, Inc. Crystal Dynamics (3DO)
- Producer: Pam Levins
- Designers: Fred Ford; Paul Reiche III
- Series: Star Control
- Platforms: MS-DOS, 3DO
- Release: MS-DOS; November 1992; 3DO; 1994
- Genres: Adventure, shoot 'em up
- Modes: Single player, multiplayer

Star Control II: The Ur-Quan Masters is a 1992 adventure shoot 'em up video game developed by Toys for Bob (Fred Ford and Paul Reiche III) and originally published by Accolade in 1992 for MS-DOS. The game is a direct sequel to Star Control, and includes exoplanet-abundant star systems, hyperspace travel, extraterrestrial life, and interstellar diplomacy. There are 25 alien races with which communication is possible.

Released to critical acclaim, Star Control II is widely viewed today as one of the greatest PC games ever made. It has appeared on lists of the greatest video games of all time.

The game was ported to 3DO by Crystal Dynamics in 1994 with an enhanced multimedia presentation. The source code of the 3DO port was licensed under GPL-2.0-or-later in 2002, the game content under CC-BY-NC-SA-2.5. The 3DO source code was the basis of the open source game The Ur-Quan Masters.

A sequel, Star Control 3, was released in 1996.

== Gameplay ==
The Captain's ship enters the Solar System at the beginning of the game.

Star Control II is an action-adventure science fiction game, set in an open universe. It features ship-to-ship combat based on the original Star Control, but removes the first game's strategy gameplay to focus on story and dialog, as seen in other adventure games. The player's goal is to free Earth from the evil Ur-Quan, by recruiting aliens to help. The main gameplay elements are exploring the galaxy, gathering resources, building a fleet, defeating enemy ships, and conversing with aliens.

One-on-one spaceship battles take place in real-time, based on the core gameplay of the original Star Control. Each ship has unique weapons, maneuvers, and secondary abilities, and winning a battle requires a combination of ship selection and skill. This combat mode can be played separately in a two-player battle mode called Super Melee. In the story mode, the player is limited to the ships they can gain from sympathetic alien races, whereas Super Melee includes every ship in both Star Control games. The only ship unique to the story mode is the player's capital ship, which is upgraded as the player gains new technology and resources.

After a brief opening sequence, the player is given near total freedom to explore the galaxy at large. Exploration often involves travelling to stars, landing on planets, and gathering resources. The player navigates their star map, with over 500 stars and 3800 planets to potentially visit. Players must manage their risk as they explore, as planets with more dangerous hazards usually feature more valuable resources, which are vital to upgrade the player's fleet. More rarely, a planet will feature an interactive alien race, who the player can engage with as a potential friend or foe. The interactive dialog options help advance the story, with branching conversations similar to other adventure games. These conversations also reveal secrets and information about the galaxy. The game vastly expands on the characters and backstory from the first game, with each species having their own characteristic conversational quirks, music, and even display fonts.

== Plot ==
Discussion with various characters is an important aspect in the game, and advances the game's story.

Whereas the first Star Control stores most of its lore in the instruction manual, Star Control II continues the story with a rich in-game experience, playing through events after the Alliance is defeated by the Hierarchy. In the last phase of the war between the Alliance of Free Stars and the Hierarchy of Battle Thralls, an Earthling ship discovered an ancient Precursor subterranean installation in the Vela star system. A massive Hierarchy offensive forced the Alliance fleets to retreat beyond Vela, stranding the science expedition, who went in to hiding. Decades later, with the help of a genius child born on the planet, the colonists activated the Precursor machinery and found out that it was programmed to build a highly advanced but unfinished starship, which could be piloted only by the now grown genius child, who alone could interact with the Precursor central computer. The new ship set out to Sol to make contact with Earth, but shortly before reaching Sol the little fleet was attacked by an unknown probe; The expedition commander, captaining the expedition's Earthling Cruiser, intercepted the alien ship before it could damage the defenseless Precursor starship, but was killed in the short fight, leaving the genius young man in command.

The player begins the game as the commander of the Precursor starship, who returns to Earth to find it enslaved by the Ur-Quan. The Captain gains the support of the skeleton crew of Earth's caretaker starbase and ventures out to contact the other races to find out what's happened since the end of the war and try to recruit allies in to a New Alliance of Free Stars against the Ur-Quan. The Captain quickly discovers that the rest of the humans' allies in the war against the Ur-Quan have either been eradicated, put under slave shields, or put into service as Ur-Quan battle thralls. As the player progresses, it is revealed that the Ur-Quan are fighting an internecine war with the Kohr-Ah, a subspecies of Ur-Quan who believe in eradicating all life in the galaxy, as opposed to enslaving it. The winner of this war will gain access to the Sa-Matra, a Precursor battle platform of unparalleled power. The player must take advantage of the Ur-Quans' distraction to contact and recruit alien races into a new alliance, gather resources and build a fleet, and find a way to destroy the Sa-Matra, before the Ur-Quan finish their war and become unstoppable.

The Captain resolves issues several of the races are facing, or exploits their weaknesses, to get them on their side. Notably the Captain finds the Chenjesu and Mmrnmhrm on Procyon undergoing their own plan to merge in to a composite species powerful enough to defeat the Ur-Quan, and captures a psychic alien Dnyarri, which the Captain discovers is a member of the race that brutally enslaved the galaxy millennia ago, causing the Ur-Quan's hegemonic and genocidal rampage around the galaxy. The Captain uses a Precursor Sun Device to accelerate the merging of the Chenjesu and Mmrnmhrm to create the Chmmr, who amplify a Precursor terraforming bomb, allowing the Captain to sacrifice his ship to destroy the Sa-Matra and defeat the Ur-Quan. After escaping the ship through a pod, the explosion incapacitates the commander for some time, until he later awakens at the medbay in the Earth Starbase. There, he learns that the loss of the Sa-Matra was a crippling blow to the Ur-Quan and witnesses the deactivation of the slave shield over Earth, revealing its true colors to space.

== Development ==
=== Concept ===
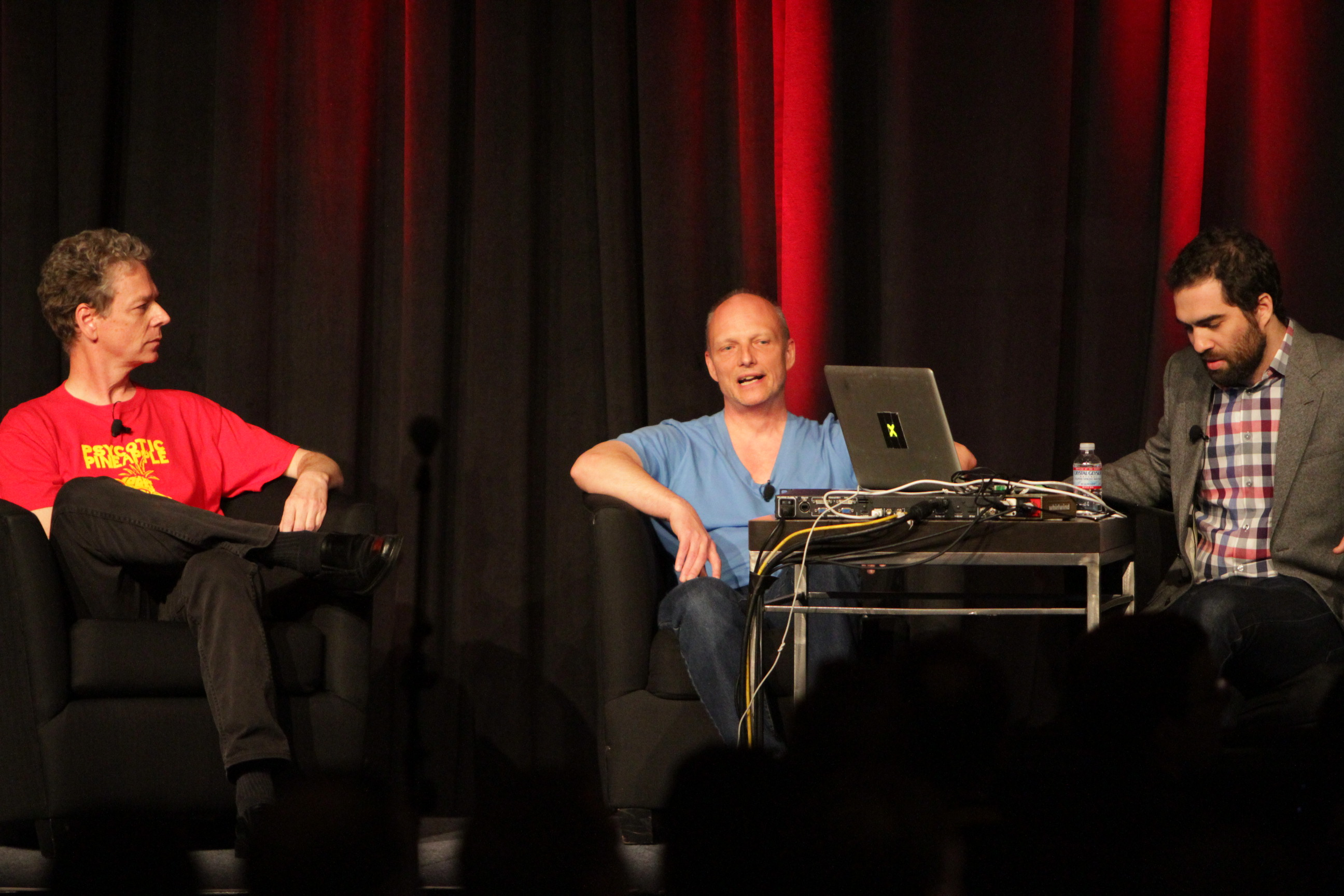
Paul Reiche III, Fred Ford, and Rob Dubbin give a postmortem of the game's development at GDC 2015.

Star Control II began as a more ambitious project than the original Star Control, with Reiche and Ford hoping to go beyond ship combat to develop a "science fiction adventure role-playing game". The team credits the pre-existing combat from the original Star Control with giving them a strong core to build a larger game around. The sequel would develop into a much more detailed adventure than the first edition. Ford explains that the original Star Control had "some story there, but it was mostly in the manual. In Star Control II, we made a conscious decision to tell more of a story". The duo would downplay the scale of the game when pitching it to their publisher Accolade, and the game's development would eventually go over schedule.

Reiche and Ford drew inspiration from many science-fiction authors, as well as peers in the game industry. A few years earlier, Reiche had been friends with Greg Johnson during the creation of Starflight, inspiring Reiche to offer creative input on Johnson's expansive science fiction game. Once Reiche and Ford conceived Star Control 2, they would draw large inspiration from Starflight. This friendship and mutual admiration even led to hiring Greg Johnson, whom they credit as "one of the most significant contributors to Star Control II". Ford also cites their shared love of author Jack Vance from their childhood, and were intrigued by the idea of exaggerated societies taken to their extremes, and intelligent characters committed to an interesting agenda. Reiche would cite the influence of numerous fiction authors over the Star Control series, including Jack Vance, Orson Scott Card, Robert Heinlein, David Brin, and Andre Norton. David Brin's Uplift Universe and Larry Niven's Known Space series are often mentioned as inspiration for Star Control II.

=== Technology ===
The creators started by asking "what people do when they go out and have an adventure in space", while keeping in mind what they could actually implement. This led them to create numerous stars and planets, through a combination of procedural generation and handcrafted assets. Despite the fact that exoplanets had yet to be fully discovered, Reiche initially took on the challenge of simulating planetary systems based on scientific principles. They ultimately decided to bypass some details of the simulation, due to its lack of distinct planets to explore. Instead, they imagined cracked planets with magma chasms, ruby planets with precious zirconium, and even rainbow colored planets. The planets were created with a procedurally generated height map, which required difficult programming solutions to simulate the appearance of a 3D sphere. They additionally simulated 3D asteroids by digitizing images of pumice they had taken from a parking lot.

The Star Control II team also invented their own fictional, flat version of space, so that the stars could be arranged in a more clear and interesting way. The algorithmically assisted generation of the star map helped to create a vast, mysterious setting for players to explore. The map also added circles of influence for the aliens, not just to describe their location, but to provide narrative hints about their changing power, relationships, and stories.

=== Fictional universe ===
Reiche and Ford wanted their new game to further investigate their self-described "superficial" stories and aliens from the original Star Control. Thus, the story for Star Control II would greatly expand on those original characters, and add a few more.

This was the last time that Reiche would design a game using pen and paper, including dozens of flow charts for the major plot points, player choices, and dialog trees. Paul Reiche III describes this creative process, "I know it probably sounds weird, but when I design a game like this, I make drawings of the characters and stare at them. I hold little conversations with them. 'What do you guys do?' And they tell me." Early in the process, they used the first game's character and ship images to create simple visual stories about the two main sides of the conflict. The main antagonist the Ur-Quan were already understood as a race of slavers in Star Control, so Reiche developed their motivation by writing their backstory as slaves themselves. To justify the Mycon's organic structures and high energy plasma, they decided that the Mycon lived beneath the planet's crust, and must have been artificially created to survive there. Fred Ford inspired the character design for the Earth starbase commander, as well as the Pkunk's insult ability, while the Spathi were inspired by a running joke about Paul Reiche's desire for self-preservation. The rich storytelling was a contrast to the first game's emphasis on player versus player combat, but they realized that their combat artificial intelligence could give story-loving players an option to delegate battles.

Once Reiche and Ford imagined the different alien personalities, Reiche hand-drew a flow chart for each alien's dialog options, which Ford would implement into the game with placeholder tags. However, the sheer quantity of writing and art proved to be challenging for the game's epic scale. Fred Ford surprised the team with his prolific coding, and it was the rest of the team who needed to catch-up with art, writing, music, and other assets. They quickly enlisted the help of friends and family to create game content. One crucial friend was Starflight creator Greg Johnson, who Reiche had previously helped on Starflight while sharing office space. Johnson ended up writing dialog for several aliens, as well as creating most of the artwork for the alien spaceships. They were also able to hire fantasy artist George Barr through mutual friends, who had inspired the game's "pulp science-fiction" feel, and happened to be living nearby. Long-time friend Erol Otus was another collaborator, who Reiche describes as contributing the widest range of content, including music, text, art, illustrations for the game manual, and (later) voice-acting.

The largest number of collaborators were needed for the game's numerous dialog options. The creators were admirers of the Monkey Island games, and aimed to achieve the same level of player choice and humor. Reiche felt that each character needed their own font to match their distinct personality, and built a font-editing system to achieve this.

=== Deadline and budget ===
Reiche and Ford felt it was difficult to maintain Accolade's interest in the game. In fact, Accolade had played a version of the game with placeholder dialog, and was content to ship the game with the "cryptic" text as-is. This led to an industry legend that the duo absconded to Alaska to finish the game without Accolade's interference. The creators later clarified that Accolade did not interfere with development and was satisfied to publish the game in any form, and that this was important to their creative freedom and artistic success. As the project went over schedule, their payment from Accolade came to an end. Fred Ford decided to financially support the team for the final months of development, and they were ultimately able to finish the project with the help of numerous family, friends, and other collaborators.

The team stretched their music budget by holding a contest to create the game's soundtrack. Reiche and Ford had previously discovered the sample-based MOD file format while porting the first Star Control's music to consoles. They posted the music contest to a newsgroup for Amiga users, despite the fact that the game was for PC, because Amiga hobbyists were the main community of MOD-tracker users in that time. The contest attracted people from around the world, due to the popularity of the MOD format in the largely European demoscene. The contest also led them to discover a teenager named Dan Nicholson, who they hired to create additional music as needed. Further music came from existing team member Erol Otus, who first composed the Ur-Quan theme on a synthesizer before it was re-sampled and exported to the MOD file format. The critically acclaimed soundtrack would include music from Aaron Grier, Erol Otus, Eric Berge, Riku Nuottajärvi, and Dan Nicholson.

Months after its release, the team would create hours of voice dialog for the 3DO version of the game, taking advantage of space afforded by CD-ROM technology, while bucking the trend of CD-based games with full motion video. Game Developer Magazine featured the game in its list of open source space games, praising its scale and charm, as well as its new features. In the end, the 3DO version would feature 11 hours of voice audio, including performances from Reiche, as well as friends Greg Johnson and Erol Otus.

== Reception ==
Star Control II received a positive reception around its release, as well as several awards. Soon after, Star Control II began to appear on many "all time best" lists for players and industry figures, a reputation that has continued ever since.

=== Reviews and awards ===
Reception

Review scores
Publication	Score
AllGame	4.5/5 (PC)
Computer Gaming World	4.5/5 (PC)
Dragon	5/5 (PC)
Electronic Gaming Monthly	9/10, 9/10, 7/10, 8/10 (3DO)
Game Players	4/5 (PC)
GamePro	4/5 (3DO)
Next Generation	3/5 (3DO)
3DO Magazine	4/5 (3DO)
Pelit	96/100 (PC)

Awards
Publication	Award
Pelit	1993 Game of the Year
GDC	Class of '93 Honor
CGW	1993 Adventure Game of the Year
VideoGames	Best Adventure Game

Computer Gaming World stated that Star Control II was as much a sequel to Starflight as to Star Control. The reviewer praised the VGA graphics and wrote that the game "has some of the best dialogue ever encountered in this genre". He concluded that the game "has been placed on this reviewer's top ten list of all time ... one of the most enjoyable games to review all year. It is not often that a perfect balance is struck between role playing, adventure, and action/arcade". In their 1994 survey of strategic space games set in the future, they gave the game four-plus stars out of five, stating that "it offers hours of 'simple, hot and deep' play". Dragon gave the game a full five-star review, telling their readers that "if you are a science-fiction gamer who enjoys a superb game environment, a high dollar-to-play ratio, and numerous challenges, SC2 is a definite must-have for your software library". Questbusters called it the "best science-fiction role-playing game since Starflight", and "best RPG of the year". Giving the game four out of five stars, Game Players described the game's epic scale, where "there's so much to do -- so many planets to explore and mysteries to solve and battles to fight -- that the game may dominate your spare time". PC Games noted the game's "rich history", describing the game as "part arcade, part role-play, Star Control II is all science fiction, with an emphasis on fiction." COMPUTE! suggested that the game "gives you exactly what you want in a space adventure", also giving the strongest praise for the music and sound as "among the best done for any game on the market." The game was also rated 96/100 by Finnish magazine Pelit, who immediately hailed it as one of the best games of the year.

Reviewing the 3DO version, GamePro remarked that the user-friendly interface makes the complicated gameplay easy to handle. They also praised the impressive graphics and the voice acting's use of unique vocal inflections for each alien race, and concluded that the game is "an addicting epic sci-fi adventure that will have patient space explorers and zero-gravity tacticians glued to their screens for a million hours. All others should stay away." The four reviewers of Electronic Gaming Monthly likewise praised the accessible interface and impressive graphics, but complained that the alien voices are sometimes difficult to understand. They cited the CD-quality audio and the Melee mode as other strong points, and one of them commented that it "blows [the PC version] out of the water." They gave it an 8.25 out of 10. Next Generation reviewed the 3DO version of the game, rating it three stars out of five, and stated that "if you've the patience to spend hours digging for minerals, the game is addictive, but not state of the art."

Jim Trunzo reviewed Star Control II in White Wolf #36 (1993), rating it a 4 out of 5 and stated that "Mystery, puzzles, combat, exploration, and more make Star Control II a science fiction software delight."

The year of its release, the Game Developers Conference honored Star Control II as an exceptional game among their "Class of '93", calling it a "perfect blend of action and adventure", as well as "sound that is exceptional enough to make gamers think they've upgraded their sound boards". The game also received Pelit magazine's first "Game of the Year" award, and an award from Computer Gaming World, naming it the magazine's 1993 Adventure Game of the Year (a co-honor with Eric the Unready).

=== "Greatest game" lists ===
Star Control II quickly began to appear on "all-time favorite" lists, a practice that continued for many years. In 1994, PC Gamer US named Star Control II as the 21st best computer game ever. The editors called it "an epic" and "thoroughly enjoyable to play and look at." That same year, PC Gamer UK named it the 33rd best computer game of all time. The editors wrote, "If ever a game deserved an award for being underrated, it's Star Control II." The next year, players voted the game into PC Gamer's Readers Top 40. Computer Gaming World created their own list in 1996, ranking Star Control II as the 29th best PC game of all time, calling it "a stunning mix of adventure, action, and humor." In 1999, Next Generation also ranked it among their top 50 games of all time.

This acclaim continued well into the next millennium. In 2000, GameSpy inducted Star Control II into their Hall of Fame, and ranked it the 26th best game of all time just one year later. The Sydney Morning Herald noted Star Control II on its 2002 list, ranking the game as the 26th best game of all time. In 2003, GameSpot included Star Control II on their list of greatest games of all time. In the same year, IGN named Star Control II as their 53rd greatest game of all time, and ranked it again at 17th greatest in 2005. In 2006, Computer Gaming World inducted Star Control II into their Hall of Fame, explaining that "what made Star Control II stand out, though, was the incredible amount of backstory and interaction with all the alien species". PC Gamer listed Star Control II the 52nd greatest PC game in their 2011 rankings, and Hardcore Gaming 101 listed it among their 2015 rankings of 200 best video games of all time.

Compared to classic games from the same period, Star Control II is also ranked on several "best of" lists. Hardcore Gaming selected the game for their 2007 list of favorite classics, with "a combination of sandbox space travel and arcade-style combat, a plotline equal to any space opera you can name, hundreds of pages' worth of interactive dialog and dozens of memorable, unique races, it's easy to see why most reviews of Star Control II quickly turn into love letters." When Kotaku compiled their 2013 list of "Classic PC Games You Must Play", Star Control II reached the very top of the list. In 2014, USGamer mentioned the game as one of the landmark titles from the 1990s. Retro Gamer remembers Star Control II as one of the top 10 games made for the 3DO Interactive Multiplayer, and later listed it among their top 100 retro games at the 68th position. Den of Geek also ranked it at #37 among their list of classic DOS games. Its status as a classic game would lead IGN to list the series among the top 10 franchises that needed to be resurrected. Comparing it to the original Star Control, Cinema Blend celebrates Star Control II in their short list of sequels that progressed well beyond their predecessors.

=== "Greatest design" lists ===
Star Control II is also recognized for its excellence in several creative areas, including writing, design, and music. In 1996, Computer Gaming World ranked Star Control II among their top 15 most rewarding game endings, proclaiming that the game "entertains right down to the end, with the some[sic] of the funniest credits since Monty Python's Holy Grail". The game's ending was similarly ranked as the third greatest of all time according to GameSpot's editors, with their readers ranking it the sixth greatest ending. Moreover, GameSpot twice acclaimed the Ur-Quan among their top ten game villains, mentioning them at the top of one 1999 list as "one of the very best villains. Even now, we are hard-pressed to find a race of adversaries as complex and three-dimensional as the Ur-Quan." The A.V. Club also included the Ur-Quan in their 2021 list of best aliens in pop culture, describing them as "tremendous sci-fi villains, importing heady old-school concepts into Star Control's relentlessly fun space-based action".

The world design of Star Control II is also celebrated, with Paste magazine giving it top ranking on their list of "games that capture the infinite potential of space". GameSpot ranked the Star Control II universe among their top ten game worlds, whereas GameRant listed Star Control II as the third largest open world map, also noting it as "perhaps the most underrated game of all time".

The game's music is remembered as the 37th greatest game soundtrack by the music magazine FACT, describing it as "a lost 80s treasure trove of unreleased techno, synth pop and Italo". The music of Star Control II was similarly listed as the second greatest game soundtrack according to GameSpot's editors, which was echoed once again by their readers.

== Legacy ==
Long after its release, Star Control II continues to garner acclaim across the game industry. Responding to film critics who criticized video games as a superficial medium, The Escapist magazine highlighted Star Control II as "the scripting was second to none. Don't be fooled by the fantastical setting - the story maturely dealt with wide ranging issues, from genocide to religious extremism, and still remained terrifying, touching, and damn funny in places." The magazine would revisit this in a 2014 retrospective, calling it a "must play for space loving gamers", offering "a massive experience filled with exploration, action and some of the funniest aliens you'll run into any video game". Rock Paper Shotgun featured the game in 2016, celebrating "some of the most memorable aliens ever put in a game, and still some of the best written." In a 2018 retrospective of the entire series, Hardcore Gaming 101 notes that "there are aspects of Star Control II that are rough around the edges..., [b]ut once you surmount those obstacles, it reveals itself as one of the smartest, funniest, most adventure-filled science fiction games ever made". In a multi-part feature on the history of video games, VGChartz noted that Star Control II is "often considered one of the greatest games ever made". Kotaku referred to it as "one of the early '90s most revolutionary sci-fi games", and game historian Rusel DeMaria describes it as one of the best games ever written. Additionally, The Dickinson Press called it "one of the best PC games ever", and The Completist notes it as "one of the greatest games ever made".

Indeed, Star Control II is admired and influential amongst notable developers in the game industry. Tim Cain credits Star Control II with inspiring his open-ended design in both Fallout and Arcanum: Of Steamworks and Magick Obscura, calling it his personal favorite RPG of all time and one of the best computer games ever developed. Founder of BioWare Ray Muzyka also cites Star Control as an inspiration, stating that "the uncharted worlds in Mass Effect comes from imagining what a freely explorable universe would be like inside a very realistic next-gen game." Indeed, journalists have noted heavy similarities in the story, characters, and overall experience of Mass Effect, even calling Star Control II a spiritual predecessor. FACT notes that Star Control II's "galaxy-spanning sci-fi setting whose adventure elements foreshadowed Mass Effect by a good 15 years". PCGamesN explains further, that "while Star Control II is a little clunky and esoteric by modern standards, this was the Mass Effect of its era, defining many of the elements you might have taken for granted in Bioware's classic sci-fi RPG series. ... Star Control's weird and wonderful alien races are far more exciting than anything Bioware gave us." Henrik Fahraeus of Paradox Interactive credits Star Control II as a major influence on strategy game Stellaris, after expressing disappointment that the Mass Effect series lacked the exploration and openness of Star Control II. Game writer and narrative designer Zoë Quinn called Star Control II a childhood obsession, describing how she "filled several notebooks with notes and maps as I constantly explored Fake Space, trying to see everything and uncover all the secrets in the game." Vice President of Insomniac Games Brian Hastings ranked Star Control II as one of his top games, and one of "the most original and perfectly executed games ever". Alexx Kay of Irrational Games hailed Star Control II as the best game "by a mile", noting that it was "one of the first story-based games where your actions had clear consequences". In Joshua Bycer's book "20 Essential Games to Study", his first chapter is devoted to analyzing Star Control II, as an unprecedented open world game far ahead of its contemporaries.

Star Control II is sometimes credited as a spiritual successor to Starflight, inheriting its legacy as a genre-defining space exploration game.

=== The Ur-Quan Masters ===
The Ur-Quan Masters is a modified open-source release of Star Control 2, based on a freely available version of the original 3DO code.

=== Sequel and continuity ===
In 2017, Reiche and Ford announced plans to create a direct sequel to The Ur-Quan Masters, which would effectively bypass the story from Star Control 3, created by the now defunct Legend Entertainment. This announcement comes after years of fan requests for a sequel. Due to disagreements between the trademark owner of Star Control and the ownership of the intellectual property within the games previously sold under the trademark, the game development was halted. A settlement has been reached, and work resumed in the fall of 2020.

After leaving Toys for Bob, Fred Ford and Paul Reiche III co-founded Pistol Shrimp Games alongside Ken Ford and Dan Gerstein, under which they are currently developing Free Stars: Children of Infinity. On April 4, 2024, the official trailer for this project was released on the GameSpot channel on YouTube. The campaign to fund the game launched on Kickstarter on April 16, 2024, and has ended on May 18, 2024, collecting more than $650 000.
