= Majokko Daisakusen: Little Witching Mischiefs =

1999 video game

Majokko Daisakusen
- Front cover showing the 7 starlets
- Developer: Toys for Bob
- Publisher: Bandai
- Platform: PlayStation
- Release: JP: February 4, 1999
- Genre: Fighting game/role-playing video game
- Mode: Single-player

Majokko Daisakusen (魔女っ子大作戦 meaning Witch Girl Battle), sometimes romanized as Majyokko Dai Sakusen, is a game released in February 1999 for the PlayStation. It was developed by the game developer Toys for Bob and published in Japan by Bandai.

On the cover and the title screen it is subtitled with the English phrase Little witching mischiefs. It is a fighting and role-playing video game starring girls with magical powers. On episode 97 of internet interview show Matt Chat, creators Fred Ford and Paul Reiche described the unusual production style. The company faxed project documentation directly from Bandai which needed to be translated from Japanese before any of them could be implemented. The process was laborious and the developers eventually turned off their fax machine in order to finish the game on schedule. The game used assets from the developer's previous titles, The Unholy War and Pandemonium!.

This game features magical girl characters from anime television series produced by Toei Animation from 1966 to 1981, and created by manga artists including Mitsuteru Yokoyama (Sally the Witch), Go Nagai (Cutie Honey), and Fujio Akatsuka (The Secret of Akko-chan).

== Cast ==
The game is a crossover that features many classic magical girl characters as playable. These include:

1. Sally Yumeno from the 1966 anime Sally the Witch
2. Atsuko Kagami from the 1969 anime The Secret of Akko-chan
3. Chappy the Witch from the 1972 anime Mahōtsukai Chappy
4. Honey Kisaragi from the 1973 anime Cutie Honey
5. Megu Kanzaki from the 1974 anime Majokko Megu-chan
6. Lunlun Flower from the 1979 anime Hana no Ko Lunlun
7. Lalabel from the 1980 anime Lalabel, the Magical Girl

== Collectibles ==
The box art for a set of 5 collectible figures produced by Bandai in association with the game.

In addition to the game, Bandai also produced a series of collectible figures of the main cast called Little Witching Mischiefs DX gashapon, which included Gou Non, the title character's rival in Majokko Megu-chan (who is not a playable character in the game).

== See also ==
- The Unholy War, the base for this game
