= The Ur-Quan Masters =

2002 game modification of Star Control II

- Original author: Toys for Bob
- Developer: The Ur-Quan Masters Port Crew
- Release: 2002
- Stable release: 0.8 / 4 January 2021; 5 years ago
- Operating system: Windows, macOS, Linux
- Predecessor: Star Control II
- Type: Adventure, shoot 'em up
- License: Code under GPL-2.0-or-later; Resources under CC BY-NC-SA 2.5; Documentation under CC BY-SA 2.0
- Website: sc2.sourceforge.net
- Repository: sourceforge.net/projects/sc2/

The Ur-Quan Masters is a 2002 open-source fangame modification, based on the action-adventure science fiction game Star Control II. The original game was released for PCs in 1992 and ported to the 3DO console in 1994. It has been frequently mentioned among the best games of all time, with additional praise for its writing, world design, character design, and music.

After the Star Control II copyrights reverted to creators Paul Reiche III and Fred Ford, they licensed their content to their fan community under the GNU General Public License, to keep their series in the public eye. The open-source development team remade the 3DO version as a port to modern operating systems, and allowed fan-made modifications to add improvements absent in the original release. Released under the title The Ur-Quan Masters (the subtitle of the original game), the modified remake has since been downloaded nearly two million times, earning critical reception as one of the best free games available, with additional praise for a high-definition graphics fan modification.

== Gameplay ==
Players may freely explore planets and moons.

The Ur-Quan Masters is a re-make of Star Control II, an action-adventure science fiction game set in an open universe. The game includes exploration, resource-gathering, combat, and diplomacy. Much of the game is played from a top-down perspective, and features real-time combat between alien ships with different abilities. The player can freely explore a galaxy with hundreds of stars, planets, and moons, which contain resources for the player to scan and retrieve in a lander vehicle. In diplomacy, the player converses with alien races in branching dialog sequences, with the goal of rallying an alliance to defeat the titular antagonists, the Ur-Quan. The combat featured in the story can also be played as a separate mode called "Super Melee".

The player plays the role of the captain of a spaceship, which returns to Earth after a lost research mission. The captain quickly discovers that Earth has been conquered by the Ur-Quan, and begins a quest to acquire knowledge, resources, and allies in order to free humanity from slavery. During the story, the Ur-Quan become entangled in a civil war, allowing the captain to contact dozens of unique alien races, and ultimately influence the outcome of the conflict. After rallying humanity's former allies, the captain is able to overcome and defeat the Ur-Quan.

== Development ==
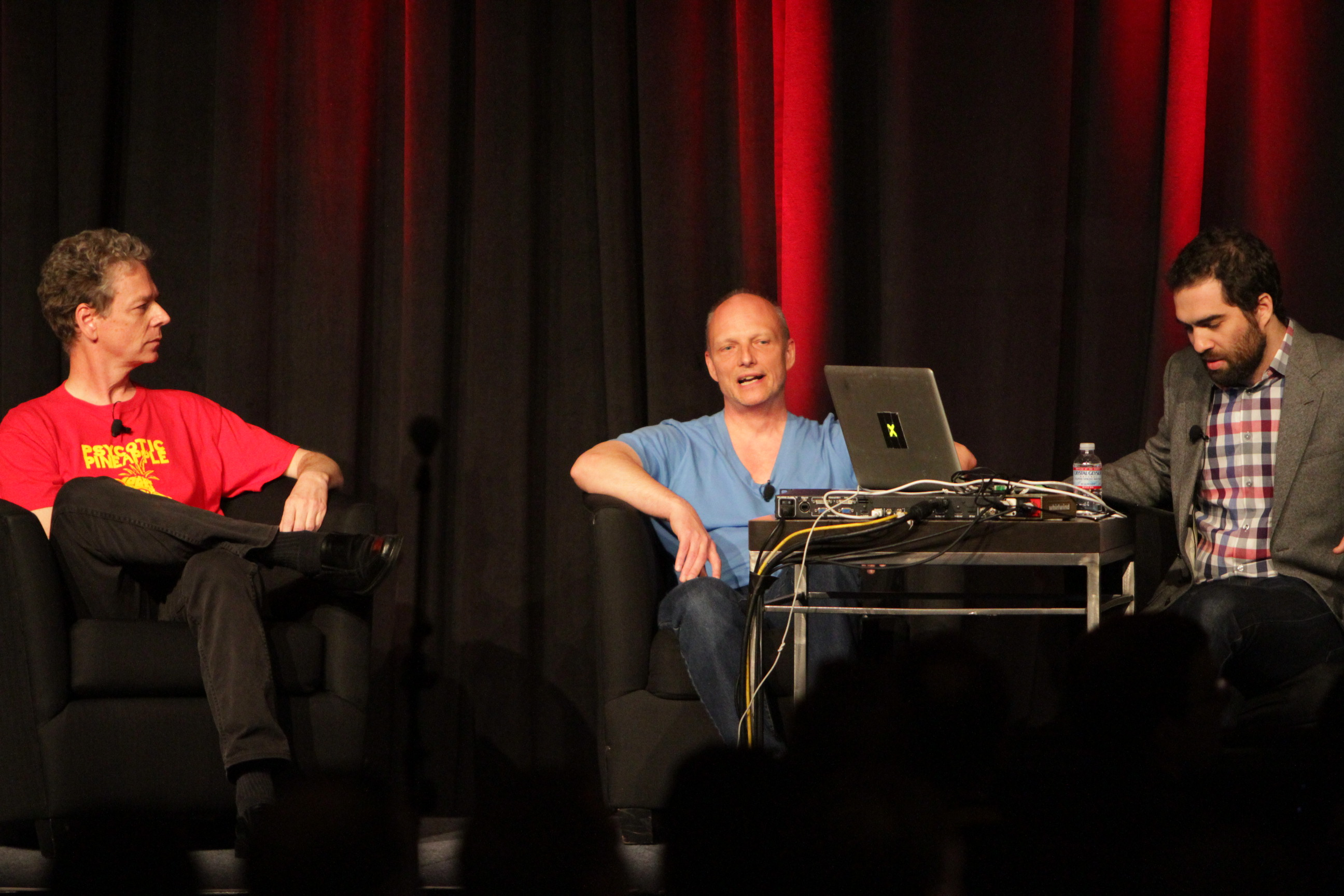
Paul Reiche III (left) and Fred Ford (center) licensed the source code to Star Control II under the GNU General Public License.

The Star Control series was created by Fred Ford and Paul Reiche, and published by Accolade. The first release in 1990 was a space strategy and action game, inspired by the 1961 space combat game Spacewar!. Star Control II, the 1992 sequel, abandoned the first game's strategic elements and greatly expanded the story, wrapping the combat system into an adventure-based narrative. Its port to the 3DO console in 1994 added fully voiced dialog and other updates to the sound and graphics. Star Control received awards upon release, and Star Control II received even more. Journalists have listed Star Control among their best games of all time, with Star Control II earning even more "best game" rankings through the 1990s, 2000s, and 2010s. Star Control II is also remembered among the best games in several creative areas, including writing, world design, character design, and music.

By the early 2000s, the Star Control II copyrights reverted to Ford and Reiche, triggered by a contractual clause where the game was no longer generating royalties. With the game no longer available in stores, Ford and Reiche wanted to keep the game in the public eye so that they could one day make another game in the series. Ford and Reiche still owned the rights to Star Control I and II, but they could not successfully purchase the Star Control trademark from publisher Accolade, so they chose the title The Ur-Quan Masters. Their independent studio Toys for Bob hired Chris Nelson as their first summer intern, who was enthusiastic for open-source software. Nelson worked with Ford to port the game to modern operating systems. Ford recalled, "we haven't made a sequel yet, so we thought the least we could do is release the source code and let the fans revive it on modern computers".

The open-source project officially launched in 2002, when Ford and Reiche licensed the source code from the 3DO version of Star Control II as open source under the GNU General Public License. Ford and Reiche own all the copyrighted content in the first two Star Control games, and granted the fan-operated project a free, perpetual license to the Star Control II content and the Ur-Quan Masters trademark. The first version of The Ur-Quan Masters suffered from performance issues, but Nelson knew skilled contacts in the open-source community who could make progress on the project. The fan community continued the project with further support, enhancements, and modifications. The credits screen names the "core team" as Serge van den Boom, Mika Kolehmainen, Michael Chapman Martin, Chris Nelson, and Alex Volkov. Ford and Reiche personally credit the open-source remake for making their creation available from 2001 to 2011, before Star Control became available for sale digitally through GOG.com. In an interview, the fans-turned-developers stated that a for-profit company would not be able to justify the port and remake, and that "without the open-source philosophy, The Ur-Quan Masters would never have existed".

Ford and Reiche launched a development studio, Pistol Shrimp, using it to take the open-source to create a new version of The Ur-Quan Masters for modern systems. This will be released for free in February 2024 for Windows computers under the name Free Stars: The Ur-Quan Masters as to avoid the intellectual property issue with Stardock. Pistol Shrimp have also started developing a sequel to this game, titled Ghosts of the Precursors.

== Modifications ==
The Ur-Quan Masters has an active fanbase, maintaining both the open-source project and an extensive wiki. The most essential modifications extended the original code to operate on newer operating systems, resolving compatibility issues with the native MS-DOS game. Fans have since modified and extended the project several times. Reiche has commented, "our policy has been to let people do whatever they want, as long as they don't turn our characters into mass murderers or make money with it. If you're making money with our stuff, we'd like a pizza".

The Ur-Quan Masters introduced features from the 3DO version that were previously unavailable on other platforms, including improved graphics and full voice acting. The extensions further added mod support and online multiplayer combat, neither of which were supported in the original games. The most notable fan modification is the high-definition version of the game, The Ur-Quan Masters HD, which was released in 2013. It was created by re-painting every frame of animation by hand.

== Reception ==
Since its 2002 release, The Ur-Quan Masters has been downloaded nearly two million times as of 2021. Soon after its debut, the game was featured in PC PowerPlay in its compilation of free games, celebrating it as a "timeless classic" from the "golden age of gaming". Finnish magazine Pelit rated it five stars in 2004 for its timeless appeal, as well as new features and remixed music. Retro Gamer featured The Ur-Quan Masters on the cover of their June 2005 edition. They further praised Ford and Reiche for making such a high-quality game available as an open-source project, stating that "this small Californian group has seen fit to grace the gaming world with one of its finest achievements, and at no cost". In a 2011 feature about open-source games, Michael Blake of IGN lauded The Ur-Quan Masters as one of the greatest games and a "pitch-perfect port to modern operating systems", which "completely hooked me, with the genius single-player storyline and the hectic multiplayer of Super Melee mode both good enough to warrant the download on their own". Hardcore Gaming 101 also called it "a brilliant port and a fantastic initiative to keep old games relevant".

The Ur-Quan Masters has been included on several best games lists since its release. In 2008, PC Gamer named The Ur-Quan Masters as one of the best free games. Game Developer Magazine featured the game in its 2010 list of open-source space games, praising its scale and charm, as well as its new features. The game was also listed in Maximum PC's 2015 "best free games" feature. Tom's Guide included The Ur-Quan Masters in its list of top classic games re-released for free, praising its staying power: "few games today feature the same mix of narrative depth, sandbox exploration and enjoyable space combat that have won the game a cult following to this day". In 2019, PCGamesN ranked The Ur-Quan Masters as one of the top 15 space games ever made and "one of the best free PC games you'll ever find", noting its characters, dialog and sense of discovery.

=== The Ur-Quan Masters HD ===
The Ur-Quan Masters HD has received praise of its own. Rock, Paper, Shotgun celebrated it as an "ambitious and well-received fan-made (and free) remake", which "retains a certain 1990s vibe despite being made more appropriate to modern machines. It lends it a certain psychedelic silliness that today's more self-regarding space games seem to lack." Kotaku likewise praised the HD updates to the visuals and sound, and Dominic Tarason of PCGamesN described the detailed hand-painted modification as "a genuinely impressive piece of work". Since its release, The Ur-Quan Masters HD has been downloaded over 200,000 times on SourceForge.

== Sequel ==
=== Free Stars: Children of Infinity ===
On October 24, 2023, the developers, consisting of Fred Ford, Dan Gerstein, Paul Reiche III and Ken Ford, announced the new name of the sequel, Free Stars: Children of Infinity, and launched its corresponding website. The official trailer was shown on the April 4, 2024 on GameSpot YouTube channel. A Kickstarter campaign was launched on April 16, 2024, to further the game development of the sequel. Within 3 hours, they met their initial $100 000 USD goal. The planning release date for the game is August 2025.
