= Alma Mater (role-playing game) =

Tabletop role-playing game

Alma Mater is a role-playing game published by Oracle Games in 1982.

== Description ==
Alma Mater is a humorous and anarchic system of role-playing high school students. Character classes include types like Brain, Cheerleader, Criminal, Jock, and Loser; other sections cover social rules, chemistry (explosives, etc.), alcohol and drugs, combat, and a section on academics. The game includes an introductory scenario.

== Publication history ==
Alma Mater was designed by Steve Davis and Andrew Warden, with art by Erol Otus, and published by Oracle Games in 1982 as a 48-page book with a color poster.

== Reception ==
J. David George reviewed Alma Mater in The Space Gamer No. 58. George commented that "Despite the fact that Alma Mater is built on a workable and innovative set of rules, its subject matter is likely to prevent most campaigns from lasting more than a session or two."

Ian R. Beste reviewed Alma Mater for Different Worlds magazine and stated that "If you are a serious collector of role-playing games, or someone who buys games in order to put together the perfect system, look at AM. The game ventures hesitantly into the hardest 'world' to simulate, the real one. Don't judge Alma Mater by its cover."

Lawrence Schick comments that "The illustrations (by the notorious Erol Otus) are in such poor taste that the game was actually banned at GenCon!"

In a retrospective review of Alma Mater in Black Gate, John ONeill said "As for all the controversy, well.. if you’re going to make a role playing game out of high school, does it makes sense to tone it down any?"
