= Toys for Bob =

American video game developer

TFB Games, Inc.
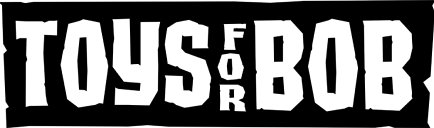
- Logo used since 2021
- Trade name: Toys for Bob
- Type: Private
- Industry: Video games
- Founded: 1989; 37 years ago
- Founders: Paul Reiche III; Fred Ford
- Headquarters: Novato, California, US
- Key people: Paul Yan (studio head); Avery Lodato (studio head)
- Products: Star Control series (1990–1992); Skylanders series (2011–2016); Crash Bandicoot series (2020–2023); Spyro series (2018–present)
- Number of employees: 180 (2021)
- Parent: Crystal Dynamics (1993–2000); Activision (2005–2024)
- Website: toysforbob.com

TFB Games, Inc., doing business as Toys for Bob, is an American video game developer based in Novato, California. It was founded in 1989 by Paul Reiche III and Fred Ford. The studio is known for creating Star Control and the Skylanders franchise, as well as for working on the Crash Bandicoot and Spyro franchises.

Toys for Bob began as a partnership between Reiche and Ford. The two had separately attended the University of California, Berkeley, in the late 1970s before entering the video game industry in the early 1980s. They later met through mutual friends in 1988, when Reiche was seeking a programmer to develop Star Control for Accolade. This led to the formation of their partnership in 1989 and the debut of Star Control in 1990. The release was considered a landmark science fiction game and led to the 1992 sequel Star Control II, which greatly expanded the series' story and scale. Star Control II is celebrated as one of the greatest video games in history and is featured on several "best of" lists for music, writing, world design, and character design. The studio adopted the name Toys for Bob to stimulate curiosity and differentiate themselves from other studios.

With Crystal Dynamics as their publisher, they developed several games, including The Horde, Pandemonium!, and The Unholy War. In the early 2000s, the studio transitioned to working on licensed games before being laid off by Crystal Dynamics. With Terry Falls as a co-owner, Reiche and Ford incorporated the studio in 2002. Activision became their publisher soon after, and eventually acquired the studio in 2005. Toys for Bob created the Skylanders series when Activision merged with Vivendi Games and acquired the Spyro franchise. The developers at Toys for Bob had already been experimenting with using physical toys to interact with video games and believed that this technology would be ideal for Spyro's universe of characters. Credited with inventing the toys-to-life genre, the 2011 release of Skylanders: Spyro's Adventure was considered a technological and commercial breakthrough. This led to a spinoff series with several successful games, generating a billion dollars in revenue for Activision in the first 15 months and winning several awards. In 2018, Toys for Bob assisted with the development of the remaster compilations Crash Bandicoot N. Sane Trilogy and Spyro Reignited Trilogy, earning a reputation leading a revival of properties from the original PlayStation.

After the release of Crash Bandicoot 4: It's About Time in 2020, Reiche and Ford left the company to start an independent studio. Toys for Bob took on new leadership under Paul Yan and Avery Lodato while working on the Call of Duty series. After Activision's parent company, Activision Blizzard, faced lawsuits over workplace harassment and discrimination, Microsoft acquired the holding in October 2023. Following layoffs at the studio, Toys for Bob spun off from Activision in May 2024.

== History ==
=== Partnership and Star Control success ===
Toys for Bob began as a partnership between Paul Reiche III and Fred Ford. The two founders separately attended the University of California, Berkeley, around the same time, and both entered the video game industry in the early 1980s. Ford started his career creating games for Japanese personal computers before transitioning to more corporate work, but after a few years working at graphics companies in Silicon Valley, Ford realized he missed working in the game industry. Meanwhile, Reiche had started his career working for Dungeons & Dragons publisher TSR before developing PC games for Free Fall Associates. Reiche's producer at Free Fall took a new job at Accolade and helped Reiche secure a three-game agreement with the publisher. At this point, Reiche needed a programmer and Ford was seeking a designer/artist, so their mutual friends set up a board game night to introduce them. Those friends included fantasy artist Erol Otus, as well as game designer Greg Johnson, who hosted the meet-up. Soon after, Reiche and Ford formed their studio in 1989.

Reiche and Ford's first collaboration was Star Control, released for MS-DOS in 1990. Originally called Starcon, the game began as an evolution of the concepts that Reiche first created in Archon: The Light and the Dark. Archon's strategic elements were adapted for Star Control into a space setting, with one-on-one ship combat inspired by the classic 1962 game Spacewar!. During production, Reiche and Ford spent time working on their collaborative process, and this was partly why the game was limited in scope compared to its sequel. Upon its release, Star Control was voted the "Best Science Fiction Game" by Video Games and Computer Entertainment, and decades later, it is remembered as one of the greatest games of all time, with numerous game developers citing it as an influence on their work.

The success of Star Control led to a more ambitious sequel, Star Control II. Reiche and Ford aimed to expand on the first game's combat system with deeper storytelling. Their goal of creating a dynamic space adventure was largely inspired by Starflight, designed by Greg Johnson in 1986. While developing Starflight, Johnson had shared office space with Reiche, who became so fascinated with the project that he helped Johnson build the game's communication system. Years later, this friendship led Reiche to ask Johnson to work on Star Control II, and Johnson became one of the game's most significant contributors. Star Control's story and characters were vastly expanded from those of the first game. As Reiche and Ford worked on the first version of the game's dialog, they recognized they needed help with the writing and art and decided to enlist the help of close friends. In addition to Johnson, they recruited Otus, who contributed art, music, and text (as well as voice acting, in a later release). Through mutual friends, they acquired the talents of fantasy artist George Barr. The project eventually ran over schedule, and the budget from Accolade ran out. During the final months of development, Ford supported the team financially.

Star Control II received even more acclaim than the first game, earning recognition as one of the best games of all time by numerous publications since its release. It is also ranked among the best games in several specific areas, including writing, world design, character design, and music. Star Control II has also inspired the design of numerous games, including the open-ended gameplay of Fallout, the world design of Mass Effect, and the story events of Stellaris. After finishing a Star Control II port to the 3DO Interactive Multiplayer (with additional voice acting and game improvements), Accolade offered Ford and Reiche the same budget to produce a third game, which they turned down to pursue other projects. As the pair had retained the rights to their characters and stories from the first two games, they licensed their content to Accolade so that the publisher could produce Star Control 3 without their involvement.

=== Growth under Crystal Dynamics ===
The studio pitched their next game to Sega, but their contacts at the company had already left for Crystal Dynamics, which led the studio to pursue a publishing agreement with them instead. Around this time, the studio was operating with Reiche, Ford, and Ford's brother Ken, with additional freelancers hired for key tasks. Whereas their previous games were released as a partnership under their legal names, their subsequent games began to refer to their studio as Toys for Bob. They initially wanted a name that would distinguish them from their competitors. Reiche's wife Laurie suggested the name "Toys for Bob", which was chosen to stimulate curiosity and allude to Reiche and Ford's appreciation for toys.

The studio's first game under Crystal Dynamics was The Horde (1994), a full-motion video action and strategy game. Aiming to take advantage of Crystal Dynamics's Hollywood connections and the increased storage size of CD-ROMs for the video scenes, they hired a cast of professional actors including Martin Short and Kirk Cameron. The game received two awards from Computer Gaming World: "Best Musical Score" for Burke Trieschmann's music and "Best On Screen Performance" for Michael Gregory's role as Kronus Maelor. In 1996, Toys for Bob released Pandemonium!, a 2.5D platform game for consoles. Their team expanded to nearly 30 people to complete the project, with substantial efforts to learn the mechanics of 3D game design. As the company grew, so did the mythology around their name. According to Reiche, since people frequently asked about the truth behind "Toys for Bob", he instructed his team to invent their own "Bob" and swear he is the only one, with the goal of "further confusing people".

As the studio prepared to release The Unholy War in 1998, Crystal Dynamics was acquired by Eidos Interactive. Unholy War was a fighting game with a strategic meta-game, similar to the combination of game modes seen in Reiche's game Archon, and the original Star Control. Reiche and Ford thought the gameplay could be used for an adaptation of a Japanese license such as SD Gundam, and Crystal Dynamics helped them get in touch with Bandai, who promised them an "even bigger license". Bandai ultimately had them produce Majokko Daisakusen: Little Witching Mischiefs, a game based on magical girl characters from Japanese anime created in the 1960s, 1970s, and 1980s. Bandai's choice of license came as a surprise to Toys for Bob, and the development process was fraught with translation challenges. As the project dragged on, the studio continued to receive bug reports in Japanese until they simply unplugged their fax machine, thus ending development. Majokko Daisakusen was released exclusively in Japan, and Toys for Bob never learned how well the game performed.

Their next release was Disney's 102 Dalmatians: Puppies to the Rescue, another major license that was considered of a higher quality than other licensed games. Soon after the release, Crystal Dynamics decided to fire the entire Toys for Bob team. After operating as a partnership for more than a decade, Reiche, Ford, and Terry Falls incorporated Toys for Bob in 2002, and announced that they were seeking a new publisher after parting ways with Crystal Dynamics and Eidos Interactive.

=== Acquisition by Activision ===
Soon after re-establishing their studio as an independent company, Reiche and Ford released the source code for the 3DO version of Star Control II as open-source software under the GNU General Public Licence (GPL) and enlisted the fan community to port it to modern operating systems. The result was the 2002 open source game The Ur-Quan Masters, released under a new title since the Star Control trademark was owned by Atari, who had acquired Accolade. An intern at Toys for Bob began porting the game to various modern operating systems, and the fan community continued the project with further support and modifications. Reiche and Ford retained the original copyrighted content within the first two Star Control games, and granted the fan-operated project a free, perpetual license to the Star Control II content and the "Ur-Quan Masters" trademark.

Toys for Bob secured Activision as their new publisher, thanks to an introduction from former staff who had founded Shaba Games and sold it to Activision. As the industry found a thriving market for licensed game adaptations, Activision asked Toys for Bob to work on Disney's Extreme Skate Adventure, which combined the publisher's game engine from Tony Hawk's Pro Skater 4 with the studio's experience working on Disney properties. The game was released in 2003 and gave the studio more experience creating games for a younger audience.

Working with Activision, Toys for Bob continued to focus on licensed games, such as Madagascar. Their growing relationship with the publisher led them to be acquired in 2005: the studio became a wholly owned subsidiary under Activision, and the management team and employees signed long-term contracts under the new corporate structure. However, the release of Madagascar showed that the market for licensed games was beginning to dry up, in part due to the negative reputation created by a flood of low quality licensed games. By this time, the company was operating with 27 employees, and needed a game that was successful enough to justify their growing team.

=== Skylanders breakthrough ===
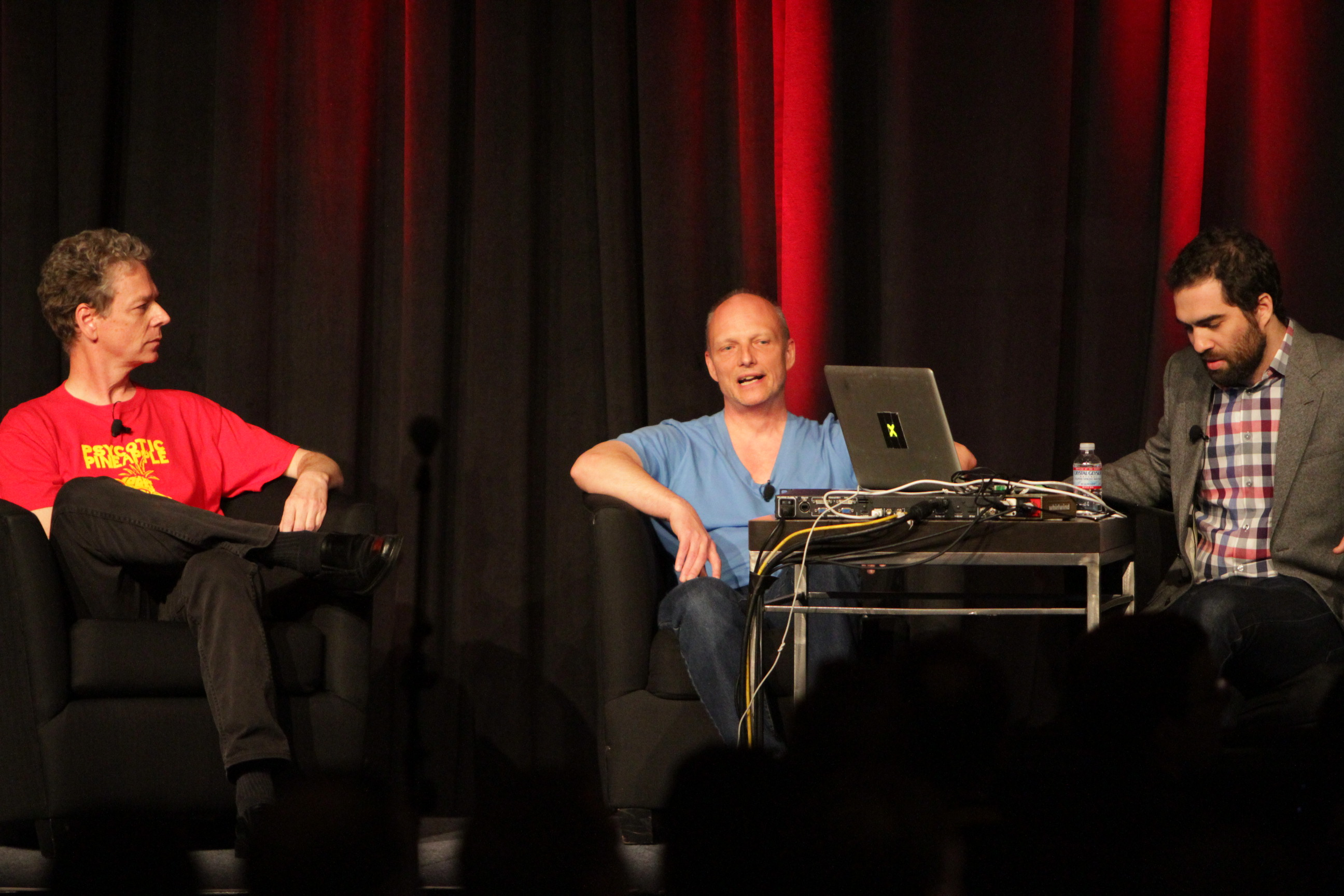
Paul Reiche III (left) and Fred Ford (middle) reflecting on their careers at GDC 2015

Activision asked the studio to generate a new idea, and the company felt pressure to find the right opportunity. One idea came from Toys for Bob character designer I-Wei Huang, who had been creating toys and robots in his spare time. The company saw the potential to adapt these toys and character designs into a game, with technical engineer Robert Leyland applying his hobby in building electronics. Coincidentally, Activision merged with Vivendi Games in 2008, and asked Toys for Bob to create a new game around Vivendi's Spyro franchise. The studio saw the potential for toy–game interaction and suggested to Activision that it would be ideal for Spyro's universe of characters. Their team also saw it as an opportunity to make use of their passion for and experience in creating monsters. Activision CEO Bobby Kotick responded well to the idea and gave them an additional year of development to better refine the gameplay, technology, and manufacturing process. Activision believed that the technology would be ideal for Nintendo's properties: they asked Toys for Bob to present the concept to Nintendo early in its development cycle, but Nintendo decided to limit their role to marketing the title for the Wii.

This culminated in the 2011 release of Skylanders: Spyro's Adventure, which became a breakthrough success. They followed this with Skylanders: Giants in 2012, allowing the series to earn a billion dollars in sales just 15 months after the release of the first game. These successes led Gamasutra to list Toys for Bob among their top developers for 2012, stating, "we're not just impressed that Toys for Bob successfully pulled Skylanders off—it sold massively, after all—we're impressed by how ballsy it was to begin with". Multiple publications have credited Skylanders with creating the toys-to-life genre, attracting competitors such as Nintendo, Disney, and the Lego Group to the multi-billion-dollar market sector.

In the years that followed, Toys for Bob created several successful Skylanders video games, including Skylanders: Trap Team. Their last game in this series was Skylanders: Imaginators in 2016, which won several awards. However, slower sales and increased competition suggested that toys-to-life games might have hit their peak, and Activision decided to discontinue the Skylanders series. Still, the Skylanders series became one of the best-selling video game franchises of all time. In late 2018, Toys for Bob donated hundreds of Skylanders toys to The Strong National Museum of Play, which planned to use them as an exhibit to document "one of the most significant game franchises of the last decade".

Toys for Bob continued their development for important licenses under Activision. They worked on a re-packaged Spyro Reignited Trilogy with updated sound and visuals, in consultation with developers from the original Spyro trilogy. Its 2018 release was considered one of the best video game remakes of all time. Having ported the Crash Bandicoot N. Sane Trilogy to the Nintendo Switch, Toys for Bob sought to maintain the momentum of that title's success by developing Crash Bandicoot 4: It's About Time, a direct continuation of the original Crash Bandicoot trilogy. Upon the game's release in 2020, the studio earned a reputation for leading a revival of properties from the original PlayStation as part of a recent trend.

=== New leadership and independence ===
Founders Reiche and Ford left Toys for Bob at the end of 2020 to create an independent studio and commence development on a sequel to The Ur-Quan Masters. Paul Yan and Avery Lodato became Toys for Bob's studio heads, and the studio continues to operate with an estimated 180 employees. In April 2021, it was announced that Toys for Bob would be working on Call of Duty: Warzone as a support studio alongside Raven Software, Infinity Ward, and Treyarch. This led to the release of Call of Duty: Vanguard in December 2021, with some of the game's content also included in Warzone. Throughout 2021, allegations of workplace harassment surfaced at Activision's parent company, Activision Blizzard, and Toys for Bob employees were among 500 employees calling for the resignation of Kotick. Reiche agreed with the need for a change in leadership at Activision Blizzard.

On January 18, 2022, Microsoft announced that it intended to acquire Activision Blizzard for $68.7 billion. Microsoft promised to strive towards safer and more inclusive working conditions among Activision's studios, including Toys for Bob. As the CEO of Microsoft's gaming division, Phil Spencer expressed interest in having Toys for Bob revive older game properties now owned by the conglomerate. Kotick also expressed his long-term desire to revive the Skylanders series, believing this was now possible thanks to Microsoft's hardware manufacturing and supply chain. As part of 1,900 job cuts instituted by Microsoft in January 2024, 89 people were laid off from Toys for Bob and the studio's offices in Novato were closed down. The remaining staffers transitioned to work from home. In February 2024, the studio announced plans to spin off from Activision. In the following month, Windows Central reported that the studio had forged a partnership with Microsoft to publish its first independent game. The studio became independent again in May 2024.

== Accolades ==
- Spyro Reignited Trilogy – Family Title of the Year, Australian Games Awards, 2018
- Star Control – 253rd Best Game of All Time, Polygon, 2017
- Skylanders: Imaginators – Tillywig Toy & Media Awards, 2017
- Skylanders: Imaginators – Best Toys of 2016, Parents, 2016
- Skylanders: Imaginators – 2016 Hot Holiday Toy List, Toys "R" Us, 2016
- Skylanders: Imaginators – Best Video Games of 2016, USA Today, 2016
- Skylanders: Imaginators – Best Family Game of E3, Game Critics Awards, 2016
- Skylanders: Imaginators – Best Family Game, Gamescom, 2016
- Star Control II – Hardcore Gaming 101 Best Video Games of All Time, 2015
- Skylanders: Giants – BAFTA Children's Game, British Academy Games Awards, 2013
- Star Control II – Best Classic PC Game, Kotaku, 2013
- Skylanders: Spyro's Adventure – Outstanding Innovation In Gaming, Academy of Interactive Arts & Sciences, 2012
- Star Control II – 52nd Greatest PC Game, PC Gamer, 2011
- Toys for Bob – Top 50 most successful game studios, MCV/Develop, 2006
- Star Control II – Computer Gaming World Hall of Fame, 2006
- Star Control II – 17th Best Game, IGN, 2005
- Star Control II – 53rd Best Game, IGN, 2003
- Star Control II – GameSpot Greatest Games of All Time, 2003
- Star Control – 45th Most Influential Game of All Time (Developer Survey), PC Gameplay, 2001
- Star Control II – 26th Best Game of All Time, GameSpy, 2001
- Star Control II – GameSpy Hall of Fame, 2000
- Star Control II – 46th Best Game of All Time, Next Generation, 1999
- Star Control II – 29th Best Game of All Time, Computer Gaming World, 1996
- Star Control – 127th Best Game of all Time, Computer Gaming World, 1996
- The Horde – Best Musical Score, Computer Gaming World, 1994
- The Horde – Michael Gregory – Best On-Screen Performance, Computer Gaming World, 1994
- Star Control II – 33rd Best Game of All Time, PC Gamer UK, 1994
- Star Control II – 21st Best Game of All Time, PC Gamer US, 1994
- Star Control II – Class of '93, Game Developers Conference, 1993
- Star Control II – Game of the Year, Pelit, 1993
- Star Control II – Adventure Game of the Year, Computer Gaming World, 1993
- Star Control – Best Computer Science Fiction Game, VideoGames & Computer Entertainment, 1990

== Games developed ==
| Year | Title | Platform(s) | Notes | Ref. |
|---|---|---|---|---|
| 1990 | Star Control | Amiga, Commodore 64, MS-DOS, Sega Genesis | | |
| 1992 | Star Control II | 3DO, MS-DOS | | |
| 1994 | The Horde | 3DO, MS-DOS, Sega Saturn | | |
| 1996 | Pandemonium! | PlayStation, Sega Saturn, Windows | | |
| 1998 | The Unholy War | PlayStation | | |
| 1999 | Majokko Daisakusen: Little Witching Mischiefs | PlayStation | | |
| 2000 | Disney's 102 Dalmatians: Puppies to the Rescue | PlayStation | | |
| 2003 | Disney's Extreme Skate Adventure | GameCube, PlayStation 2, Xbox | | |
| 2005 | Madagascar | GameCube, PlayStation 2, Xbox | | |
| 2006 | Tony Hawk's Downhill Jam | Wii | | |
| 2008 | Madagascar: Escape 2 Africa | PlayStation 3, Wii, Xbox 360 | | |
| 2011 | Skylanders: Spyro's Adventure | PlayStation 3, Wii, Xbox 360 | | |
| 2012 | Skylanders: Giants | PlayStation 3, Wii, Xbox 360 | | |
| 2014 | Skylanders: Trap Team | Nintendo 3DS, PlayStation 3, PlayStation 4, Wii, Wii U, Xbox 360, Xbox One | | |
| 2016 | Skylanders: Imaginators | Nintendo Switch, PlayStation 3, PlayStation 4, Wii U, Xbox 360, Xbox One | | |
| 2018 | Crash Bandicoot N. Sane Trilogy | Nintendo Switch | Port development | |
| 2018 | Spyro Reignited Trilogy | Nintendo Switch, PlayStation 4, Xbox One | | |
| 2020 | Crash Bandicoot 4: It's About Time | Nintendo Switch, PlayStation 4, PlayStation 5, Windows, Xbox One, Xbox Series X/S | | |
| 2021 | Call of Duty: Warzone | PlayStation 4, Windows, Xbox One | Additional work | |
| 2022 | Call of Duty: Modern Warfare II | PlayStation 4, PlayStation 5, Windows, Xbox One, Xbox Series X/S | Additional work | |
| 2023 | Crash Team Rumble | PlayStation 4, PlayStation 5, Xbox One, Xbox Series X/S | | |
| 2023 | Call of Duty: Modern Warfare III | PlayStation 4, PlayStation 5, Windows, Xbox One, Xbox Series X/S | Additional work | |
| 2027 | Spyro: A Realm Beyond | Nintendo Switch 2, PlayStation 5, Windows, Xbox Series X/S | | |
