= Paul Reiche III =

American game designer (born 1961)

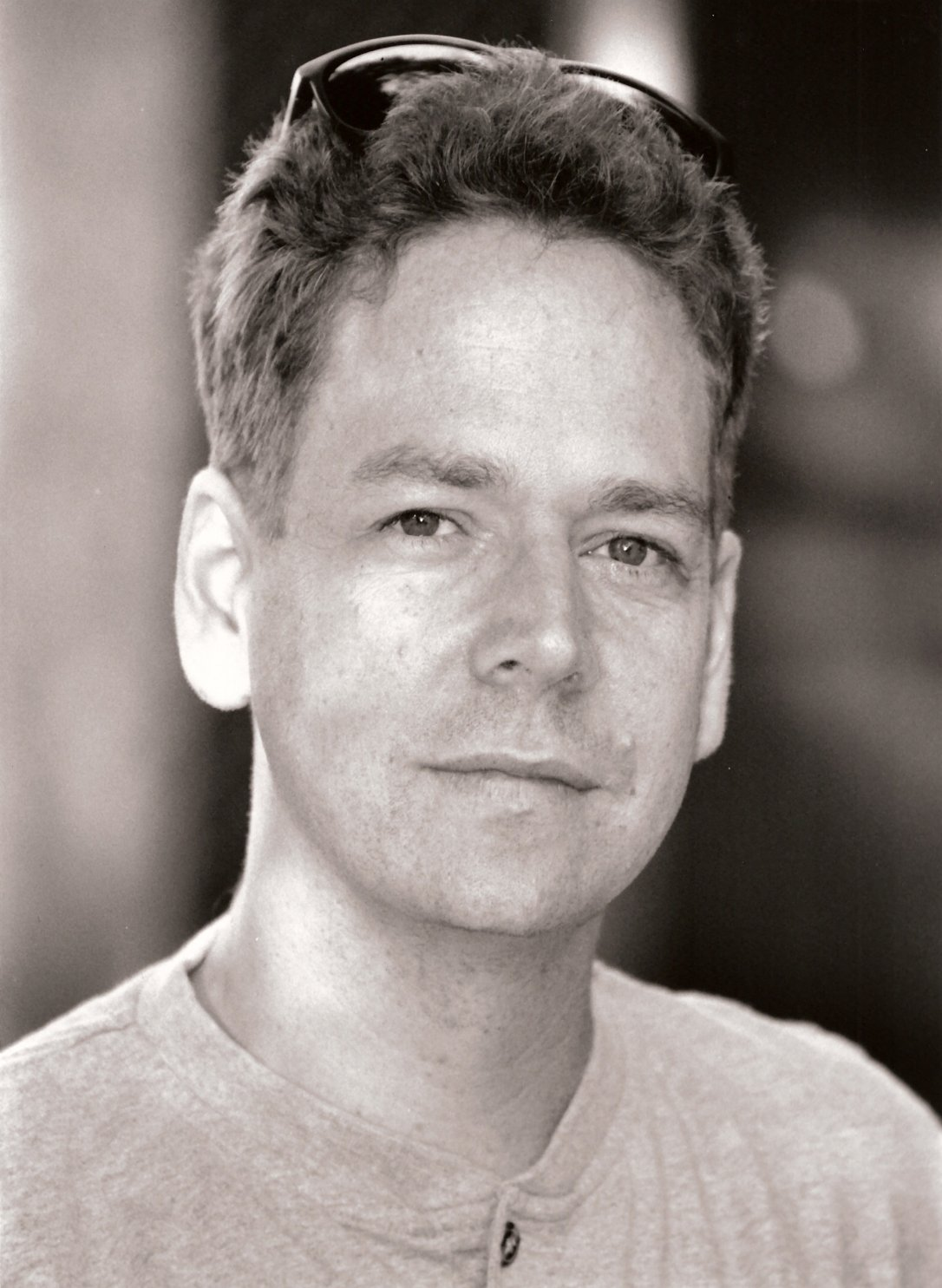
- Paul Reiche in 2008
- Education: University of California Berkeley
- Occupations: Toys for Bob Game Studio President, Creative Director, game designer

Paul Reiche III (/ˈrɪtʃi/ RITCH-ee) is an American game designer. His career started in the pen and paper RPG industry, where he collaborated with artist Erol Otus on games such as Dungeons & Dragons and Gamma World. He then transitioned into video games, working with Jon Freeman to establish Free Fall Associates and developed titles like Mail Order Monsters, World Tour Golf, and Archon. Later, he left Free Fall to establish Toys for Bob with Fred Ford. Their first collaboration resulted in Star Control. After a successful sequel, they declined to make a third installment, instead focusing on other projects including the successful Skylanders franchise.

== Career ==
=== Pen and paper RPGs ===
Reiche was a childhood friend of artist Erol Otus, before either of them worked in the role-playing game industry. He and Otus played role-playing games together and released a few small games in the genre. After Otus joined TSR, the then-publisher of Dungeons & Dragons (D&D), Reiche was able to eventually find employment there as a writer.

They made contributions to the evolving game and other games by TSR—Otus with artwork, Reiche with game design (primarily on D&D and Gamma World). Reiche's credits as developer include Isle of Dread, Slave Pits of the Undercity and Assault on the Aerie of the Slave Lords, and The Ghost Tower of Inverness, and he also contributed to Gary Gygax's Legion of Gold for Gamma World. Reiche also invented the race of Thri-kreen mantis warriors for Advanced Dungeons & Dragons, which debuted in the second set of Monster Cards.

=== Video games ===
Through his work at TSR, he met Jon Freeman, co-founder of computer game company Automated Systems (later Epyx), and together they decided to start a new gaming studio called Free Fall Associates. During this time, Reiche worked on Mail Order Monsters, World Tour Golf, and Archon, which were released with Electronic Arts. Around this time, Reiche also befriended Greg Johnson and became fascinated with his expansive science fiction game Starflight. Johnson had many conversations with Reiche, who advised him to draft a "story network" that would highlight all the most important points of the story and list the in-game objects necessary to advance from one to the next. Reiche's work on Starflight lasted a few weeks, while he was "supposed to be working on Mail Order Monsters".

=== Toys for Bob ===
After several successful releases, Reiche left Free Fall to form Toys for Bob with Fred Ford. Though they had previously attended the same school, they had never met until a games night arranged by friends, both seeking a partner to work on a new project. One of the mutual friends who helped introduce them was fantasy artist Erol Otus. This led to their first collaboration, the game Star Control. Reiche and Ford both shared a love of Jack Vance in both their formative years, and took inspiration from exaggerated societies taken to their extremes, and intelligent characters committed to an interesting agenda. While Reiche focused on the game design and fiction, Ford was responsible for the programming.

After publishing the game, Accolade contracted with Reiche and Ford to develop the sequel, Star Control II. As the project developed, he hired longtime friend Greg Johnson, who is credited as "one of the most significant contributors to Star Control II". The project would draw inspiration from Starflight, which Reiche had helped with just a few years prior. Another friend, Erol Otus, is described as one of the broadest contributors in terms of different aspects of Star Control II, including illustrations for the game manual, in-game art, music, text, and even voice-acting. Reiche himself voiced the Mycon and the neo-Dnyarri (also known as the Talking Pet).

After the success of Star Control II, Accolade offered Reiche and Ford the same budget to produce another sequel, which they turned down to pursue other projects. Toys for Bob proceeded to release Pandemonium! and The Unholy War, and eventually took on a series of contracts for licensed work through the early 2000s. By 2002, Toys for Bob parted ways with Crystal Dynamics and Eidos Interactive, and began seeking a new publisher. After completing Disney's Extreme Skate Adventure (under the Tony Hawk's Pro Skater license), Reiche had all-but released Madagascar when publisher Activision fully acquired his company, in May 2005. What had begun as a partnership had evolved into a division of Crystal Dynamics, then a corporation, and finally a studio within Activision.

=== Under Activision ===
Reiche would continue to work on licensed properties such as Tony Hawk's Downhill Jam. In that time, Activision gained the Spyro license, and suggested that Toys for Bob come up with something. This culminated in the release of Skylanders: Spyro's Adventure in 2011, with Reiche as Toys for Bob's Creative Director. The game became a surprise success, and his most notable game since Star Control. The next year, they followed up with the successful release of Skylanders: Giants, building a new franchise with one billion dollars in sales just 15 months after the first game. The series was one of the first and most successful to utilize the toys-to-life feature, and the soaring demand would challenge Reiche to release Skylanders: Trap Team on 10 platforms simultaneously, in 2014.

After years of requests from fans, Fred Ford and Paul Reiche III announced they would be working on a direct sequel to the story of Star Control II.

=== Star Control intellectual property split ===
In 2018, Stardock sued Paul Reiche III along with Fred Ford in Stardock Systems, Inc. v. Reiche, for trademark infringement of the "Star Control" trademark. During the course of the lawsuit, Stardock trademarked numerous alien names from Star Control 1 and 2. Reiche and Ford asserted that Atari only owned the game name, marketing content and the new aliens in Star Control 3, and that the in-game alien names to the first two games were never Atari's to sell. Litigation ended at June 2019 when both sides reached a settlement agreeing that Stardock has exclusive rights of the Star Control name with a list of alien names from the first two games being for the exclusive use for Reiche and Ford.
