= Fred Ford (programmer) =

American video game programmer

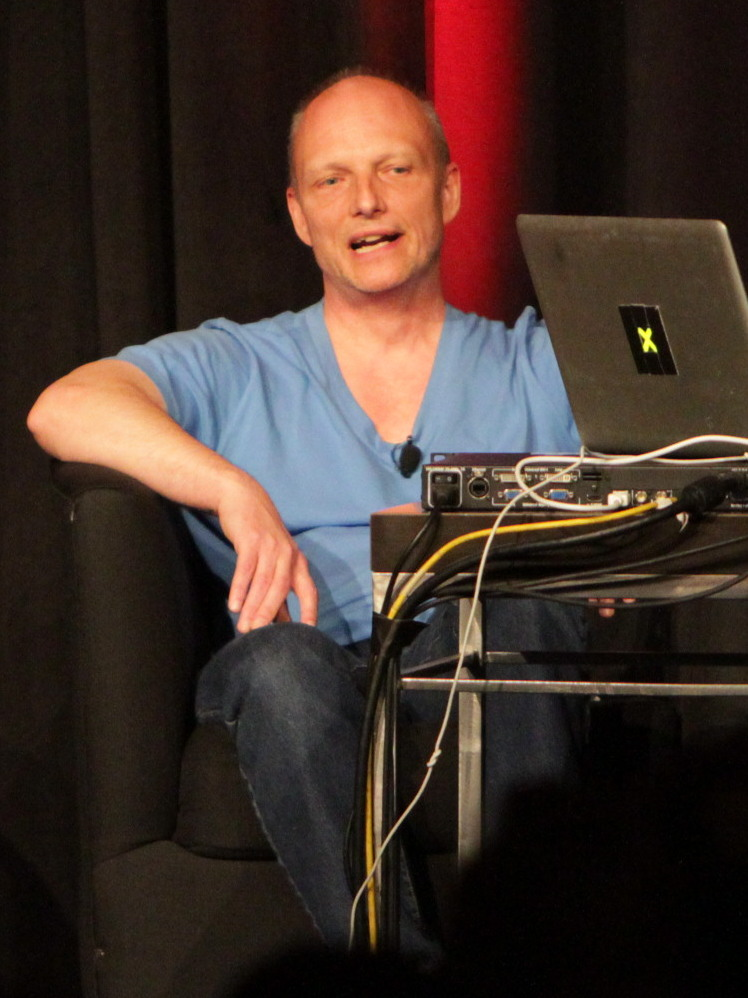
- Ford in 2015
- Born: Robert Frederick Ford
- Education: University of California, Berkeley
- Occupation: Video game programmer
- Known for: Toys for Bob (1989–2020)
- Father: L. R. Ford Jr.

Robert Frederick Ford is an American video game programmer and son of mathematician L. R. Ford Jr. With Paul Reiche III he founded video game studio Toys for Bob in 1989; they led the company until late 2020.

Star Control and Star Control 2 were created by Reiche and Ford, with Reiche as lead designer and Ford as lead programmer. Ford was also the lead programmer on The Horde and Pandemonium.

== Career ==
=== Beginnings and Star Control ===
Ford attended the University of California, Berkeley. In the early 1980s, Ford began his game career while in college, creating games exclusively for the Japanese market. Working for a company called Unison World (later Magicsoft), he worked on his first games for a Japanese monochrome handheld, including a bowling game, a bi-plane flight game, and a tank game. Soon after, he moved onto developing for the NEC PC-6000 series, the MSX, and Fujitsu systems, with titles such as Pillbox, Sea Bomber, and Ground Support.

Ford was working on an unreleased title, when Magicsoft ran out of money. This led Ford to transition to more corporate employment. He worked for graphics companies in Silicon Valley, until he realized he missed working in the game industry. Ford told friends he was seeking a designer-artist to collaborate with, and his friends knew Paul Reiche III was seeking a programmer-engineer. Ford and Reiche had actually attended college together, and their friends arranged to re-introduce them at a game night hosted by game designer Greg Johnson. One of the friends who encouraged the get-together was fantasy artist Erol Otus

Reiche and Ford's first collaboration was Star Control, with Ford focused on programming, and Reiche focused on the game design and fiction. Originally called Starcon, the game began as an evolution of the concepts that Reiche first created in Archon: The Light and the Dark. Archon's strategic elements were adapted for Star Control into a space setting, with one-on-one ship combat inspired by the classic 1962 game Spacewar!. As Ford and Reiche's workflow as a team was developing, the game took on a more limited scope compared to the sequel. Upon its release in 1990, Star Control was voted the "Best Science Fiction Game" by Video Games and Computer Entertainment. Decades later, it is remembered as one of the greatest games of all time. "[A]s a melee or strategic game, it helped define the idea that games can be malleable and dynamic and players can make an experience wholly their own."

The success of their first game led to a more ambitious sequel in Star Control II. Reiche and Ford aimed to go beyond ship combat to develop a "science fiction adventure role-playing game". Their goal of creating a dynamic space adventure was largely inspired by Starflight, created by Greg Johnson. A few years earlier, Reiche had been friends with Johnson. During the game's creation, Reiche was inspired to offer creative input for Johnson's expansive science fiction game. This friendship and mutual admiration led Reiche and Ford to hire Johnson for Star Control II. The duo later credited Johnson as one of the game's most significant contributors. Star Control's story and characters were vastly expanded from the story and characters in the first game. As Reiche and Ford worked on the first version of the game's dialog, they recognized they needed help with the writing and art and were forced to enlist the help of friends and family. In addition to Johnson, they recruited long-time friend Erol Otus, who contributed music, text, art, and illustrations for the game's manual, and (later) voice-acting. Through mutual friends, they acquired the talents of famed fantasy artist George Barr. The project eventually ran over schedule, and the budget from publisher Accolade ran out. During the final months of development, Fred Ford supported the team financially.

Star Control II became one of the best games of all time, according to numerous publications in the 1990s, 2000s, and 2010s. It is also ranked among the best games in several specific areas, including: writing, world design, character design, and music. The game also influenced other titles, most notably the open-ended gameplay of Tim Cain's Fallout, the world design of Mass Effect, and the story events of Stellaris.

=== Toys for Bob ===
Ford and Reiche began branding themselves as Toys for Bob, with The Horde as the studio's first official title. By this point, Reiche and Ford were doing contract work for game publisher Crystal Dynamics, with their three-person studio recruiting Fred Ford's brother, Ken. The Horde was a fantasy action-strategy hybrid game comparable to Star Control II, and was notable for including performances from actors Kirk Cameron and Michael Gregory.

=== Acquisition by Activision and Skylanders breakthrough ===
Toys for Bob secured Activision as their new publisher, thanks to an introduction from former Toys for Bob staff who had founded Shaba Games and been acquired by Activision. The publisher offered Toys for Bob the Disney license for Disney's Extreme Skate Adventure, which led to a 2003 game release. This successful relationship led to Toys for Bob being acquired by Activision in May 2005. The company became a wholly owned subsidiary, and the management team and employees signed long-term contracts under the new corporate structure. Working with Activision, Toys for Bob continued to focus on licensed video games, such as Madagascar. However, the market for these types of games began to dry up, in part due to the negative reputation created by other licensed games.

The company searched for new opportunities. One such idea came from Toys for Bob character designer I-Wei Huang, who had been creating toys and robots in his spare time. The company saw the potential to adopt these toys and character designs into a game, with technical engineer Robert Leyland applying his hobby in building electronics. Coincidentally, Activision merged with Vivendi Games in 2008, and asked Toys for Bob to create a new game around Vivendi's Spyro franchise. The team saw the potential for toy-game interaction and suggested to Activision that it would be ideal for Spyro's rich universe of characters. Activision CEO Bobby Kotick responded well to the idea, and gave the team an additional year of development to better refine the technology, the manufacturing process, and the gameplay. Ford credits Activision for funding the expensive and risky development, "we could have thought of this idea as independents and never got it made." This culminated in the 2011 release of Skylanders: Spyro's Adventure, which became a breakthrough success for the developer, their most notable game since Star Control.

In October 2017 Fred Ford and Paul Reiche III announced they would be working on a direct sequel to Star Control II called Ghosts of the Precursors.

=== Star Control intellectual property split ===
In 2018, Stardock sued Paul Reiche III along with Fred Ford in Stardock Systems, Inc. v. Reiche, for trademark infringement of the "Star Control" trademark. During the course of the lawsuit, Stardock trademarked numerous alien names from Star Control 1 and 2. Reiche and Ford asserted that Atari only owned the game name, marketing content and the new aliens in Star Control 3, and that the in-game alien names to the first two games were never Atari's to sell. Litigation ended at June 2019 when both sides reached a settlement that involved the parties exchanging honey for mead and the parties agreeing that Stardock has exclusive rights of the Star Control name with a list of alien names from the first two games being for the exclusive use for Reiche and Ford.
