= Hardcore Gaming 101 =

Online video game magazine

Hardcore Gaming 101, also known as simply HG101, is an online video game magazine and website founded by Gamasutra author Kurt Kalata in 2004. Kalata established the site after graduating college, when he noticed the overabundance of game strategy guides, and felt that someone should create more books about gaming history. In its formative years, Hardcore Gaming 101 focused especially on games from Japan. The site has become known for its in-depth coverage of classic games and the history behind them.

Kalata describes his motivations for founding the site, "gaming history is important to me because it's important to analyze how everything is connected to each other. ... New products are always influenced by things that came before it, so it's interesting to trace where certain elements may have come from and to recognize the talents of the trailblazers."

== Recognition ==
Nintendo Life contributor Damien McFarren has called the site "a goldmine for retro gamers, with its staff tirelessly uncovering gems from the past that everyone else has all but forgotten about." The Escapist took note of the site's "exhaustively researched spotlights on games old and new alike", calling Hardcore Gaming 101 "a website that should double as the go-to history text for everyone working in the gaming industry." Destructoid similarly said that "the site excels at unearthing gaming trivia unknown to all but the most insanely dedicated Wikipedia moderators", calling the publication a "gem".
