= Erol Otus =

American artist

- Born: United States
- Occupations: Artist, game designer
- Years active: 1977–present
- Known for: Dungeons & Dragons

Erol Otus is an American artist and game designer, who contributed art to the fantasy role-playing game (RPG) genre, especially early in the Dungeons & Dragons franchise. He created art for the award winning Star Control II as well as providing the voice for one of the character races, the Chmmr, in the same game.

== Biography ==
Otus graduated from high school in Berkeley, California. A self-taught artist since childhood, Otus developed an interest in role-playing games. His first professional artwork in the genre was for the Arduin Grimoire in 1977. He won an honorable mention in a fanart contest in Dragon magazine No. 13, which also led to employment in the art department of game company TSR in Lake Geneva, Wisconsin in the 1970s. After leaving the company, he studied painting at UC Berkeley and also took classes at the Academy of Art in San Francisco. He has cited a wide range of influences on his work from Dr. Seuss and Frank Frazetta to modern artists such as Joan Miró, Willem de Kooning and Wassily Kandinsky.

== Role-playing games ==
Erol Otus was a prolific contributor to the early Dungeons & Dragons (D&D) franchise, creating full covers as well as many interior illustrations for TSR materials. For example, he created the cover for the first version of the D&D manual Deities & Demigods and illustrated the Cthulhu pantheon within. According to fellow contributor Jeff Dee, many of the original versions of this work were lost during a later clean-out of the TSR offices.

Otus has also provided cover art and interior illustrations for Goodman Games, Oracle Games (in particular Alma Mater - The High School RPG) and the Arduin series. His art was featured on the covers of the new HackMaster edition and issue #8 of Fight On!

While working at TSR, Otus was a runner-up in TSR's 4th Invitational AD&D Masters Tournament at Gen Con XIII, a contest to choose the game's best overall dungeon master. He competed against the likes of Lenard Lakofka and first place was taken by Frank Mentzer.

Otus was an artist for Jean Wells D&D adventure module Palace of the Silver Princess. The module was recalled shortly after release, with the official reason being four pieces of artwork by Otus and Laura Roslof that were deemed to be overly sexual. The shared belief between TSR’s employees was that the real reason for the callback was Otus’s caricatures in the illustration for Well’s three-headed monster Ubue, who Otus had changed from their original design into having three human heads. Who the heads were caricatures of wasn’t fully agreed upon by TSR staff, guesses varied from TSR executives, creative staff members, or recently terminated employees.

In 2014, Scott Taylor of Black Gate, named Erol Otus as 9A in a list of The Top 10 RPG Artists of the Past 40 Years, saying "I applaud Otus for keeping his style and staying true to his roots, so an inclusion on this list is a worthy honor."

== Video games ==
Otus has also provided illustrations, production design and voice overs for computer games such as The Last Ninja, Star Trek: Generations, Mail Order Monsters and Star Control II. Star Control II was named by IGN as the 17th best game of all time, and by GameSpot as one of the greatest games of all time.

== Other work ==
Otus provided the cover art for the album Down Among The Deadmen (2000) by American heavy metal band Slough Feg (then known as Lord Weird Slough Feg).
