= Greg Johnson (game designer) =

American video game designer

- Born: 1960 (age 65–66); Passaic, New Jersey
- Education: Colorado College; University of California, San Diego
- Occupation: Game designer
- Notable work: Starflight, Starflight 2, ToeJam & Earl series
- Spouse: Sirena Johnson
- Children: 2
- Website: http://humanaturestudios.com

Greg Johnson (born 1960) is an American video game designer known for the ToeJam & Earl and Starflight games. He has worked for Binary Systems and Electronic Arts and co-founded ToeJam & Earl Productions with Mark Voorsange. In 2006, he founded HumaNature Studios. His game credits include Orly's Draw-A-Story (1997), Kung Fu Panda World (2010), and Doki-Doki Universe (2013).

== Early life ==
Johnson was born in Passaic, New Jersey to an African-American father and a Jewish mother whose family had escaped Russia during World War II. He is one of five children, three of whom are step-siblings. His mother was an administrator for a special education school, and his father was a professor of philosophy and musicology. When Johnson was three, his parents separated and his mother moved the family to Los Angeles, where, when Johnson was 12, his mother married a child psychologist who became Johnson's stepfather. Johnson attended Alexander Hamilton High School, and then Colorado College, where he learned his first programming language, Fortran. There, he designed a simple sword fight simulator (which he later called "boring as hell"). After Colorado College, he went on to the University of California, San Diego, studying biolinguistics. It was while at university that he first played the influential dungeon crawler video game Rogue, which influenced many of his later works.

== Electronic Arts ==
Johnson made ends meet by providing graphics for software such as Deluxe Paint, and was also hired by Binary Systems, though with minimal pay. He was living off money loaned to him by a friend, to whom he promised a cut of royalties from his first game. The game's development was never assured and it was almost cancelled several times, but eventually, with the help of Electronic Arts producer Joe Ybarra, the game Starflight was released in 1986 to positive reviews, and sales which continued to climb for the next year (and Johnson's friend got quadruple his money back). Johnson then continued to work for Electronic Arts, at the time a small company with about 30 employees, contributing graphics to titles such as Adventure Construction Set and F/A 18 Interceptor. In 1988, following a suggestion by EA's Bing Gordon, Johnson designed the quirky four-player game Caveman Ughlympics.

In 1989, Johnson was introduced to programmer Mark Voorsanger, and they began working on two games, Starflight 2, and an even quirkier title than Caveman, ToeJam & Earl. Starflight 2 was published by Electronic Arts, and won the "Game of the Year" award from Computer Gaming World magazine.

== ToeJam & Earl Productions ==
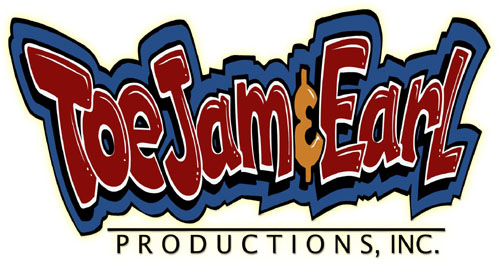
Company logo for ToeJam and Earl Productions (also called JVP Productions)

Following the success of the Starflight games, Johnson and Voorsanger formed a new company, Johnson Voorsanger Productions (JVP), to focus on ToeJam & Earl, which they pitched as a 2-player game to Sega of America. ToeJam borrowed the randomization ideas of Rogue and followed the adventures of two aliens who crashlanded on a zany planet, where they were chased by quirky adversaries such as a "nerd herd" and "killer ice cream truck". The game was published in 1991 to positive reviews, but sales were sluggish and the game was branded a flop. It turned into a sleeper hit though, sales continued to climb, and it developed a cult following. It eventually became known as one of the classics of the Sega line, and as of 2015, was routinely voted as the Sega title that fans would most like to see return.

JVP's next game was a sequel to ToeJam, also published through Sega. The first design was scrapped by Sega because of concerns on how to market the game, so ToeJam & Earl in Panic on Funkotron was eventually released in 1993, as a 2D side-scroller. It received positive reviews, but there was a backlash from fans who did not like the new side-scrolling format.

Johnson & Voorsanger then renamed their company as "ToeJam & Earl Productions", and worked on other projects, such as an educational game for Broderbund Software. In 1998, Johnson became Creative Director for the software company ePlanet, Inc., and also for Ububu, a San Francisco-based startup. None of their products were ever released, though some got fairly far along in the design process, such as ePlanet's Freeblenux, a game where a virtual alien character could interact with the player through a camera on top of the monitor.

In 2002, Johnson & Voorsanger again worked with Sega to release a third version of the ToeJam series, ToeJam & Earl III: Mission to Earth. It went back to the original perspective format, added a third character Latisha, and was published as a 3D game on Xbox, receiving generally favorable reviews, though sales did not meet expectations, and Voorsanger and Johnson then parted ways. Voorsanger went back to Electronic Arts as a producer for a period of time, leaving for Leapfrog as a producer for a while longer, but then left the game industry around 2005 to become a business consultant; staying in the same office as TJ&E Productions, under a new company called "Wayward Consulting". Johnson continued as a solo designer, initially as a consultant for multiple game companies, such as working with Will Wright on The Sims 2, giving advice on how to make the characters more believable, and how to link the different sections of Spore into something coherent. He also wrote a series of white papers for the Leapfrog company, and worked briefly with Jonathan Sari at a startup called Multiversal Entertainment in 2005, trying to design interactive movie-like stories.

== HumaNature Studios ==
In 2006, Johnson founded his own studio, HumaNature Studios, and built a team to work on the game What's Your Type for Konami, a project he had been working on since 2004. Intended for the Nintendo DS, the game was fully completed but Konami chose to never publish it, and the rights eventually reverted to Johnson. In the meantime, he continued as an independent designer, such as with a group in Oregon that was researching dinosaur movement, Kalbridge Games, and worked with them to release the game Save the Dinos in 2007. He then re-focused his studio on a game to complement the hit movie Kung Fu Panda, working with DreamWorks Animation to build Kung Fu Panda World, released in 2010. Then, based on the design for the earlier unreleased Konami game, Johnson released two Facebook apps in 2012, Deko-Deko Mail and Deko Deko-Quiz, followed by Doki-Doki Universe in 2013, a first-party title with Sony for the PlayStation console.

In February 2015, Johnson announced a new title, ToeJam & Earl: Back in the Groove, which was being developed independently from Sega and instead being funded by Kickstarter. The game revisits the format of the original game, featuring 2D character models on 3D worlds with overhead perspective, and is planned to support online multiplayer. The game sought a funding target of US$400,000 by March 27, 2015. As of March 25, 2015, they had reached their target and were funded to finish development of Back in the Groove, which was released in 2019.

== Awards ==
- Starflight 2, "Game of the Year" award from Computer Gaming World magazine.
- Orly's Draw-A-Story:
  - Innovation Award from Academy of Interactive Arts & Sciences
- GamesRadar: ToeJam & Earl 2 in Panic on Funkotron listed at #10 of "Best Sega Genesis/Mega Drive games of all time.
- Complex magazine: ToeJam & Earl listed at #55 on "The 100 Best Sega Genesis Games"
- Mega listed ToeJam & Earl at #13 on its list of the best games of all time.

== Game credits ==
=== Designer ===
- Starflight (1986, Electronic Arts)
- Caveman Ugh-Lympics (1988, Electronic Arts)
- Starflight 2: Trade Routes of the Cloud Nebula (1989, Electronic Arts)
- ToeJam & Earl (1991, Sega)
- Star Control II (1992, Accolade)
- Ready-Aim Tomatoes (1992, Sega), a ToeJam & Earl Light Gun game
- ToeJam & Earl in Panic on Funkotron (1993, Sega)
- Orly's Draw-A-Story (1997, Broderbund)
- Choo-Choo Soul (2001, Disney), Disney show
- ToeJam & Earl III: Mission to Earth (2002, Sega), Xbox
- The Sims 2 (2004, EA), consultant
- Piglet's Special Day (2006, Other Oceans), plug-n-play Disney game
- Save the Dinos (2007, Kalbridge Games)
- Spore (2008, EA)
- Kung Fu Panda World (2010, DreamWorks Animation)
- Deko-Deko Mail (2012, HumaNature Studios) Facebook app
- Deko Deko-Quiz (2012, HumaNature Studios) Facebook app
- Doki-Doki Universe (2013, HumaNature Studios), PlayStation
- ToeJam & Earl: Back in the Groove (2019, HumaNature Studios)
- Kimono Cats (2023, HumaNature Studios)

=== Graphics ===
Johnson provided graphics for:

- Adventure Construction Set
- F/A-18 Interceptor
- Deluxe Paint (1986)
