= Erin Hoffman =

American game developer, blogger and fantasy writer

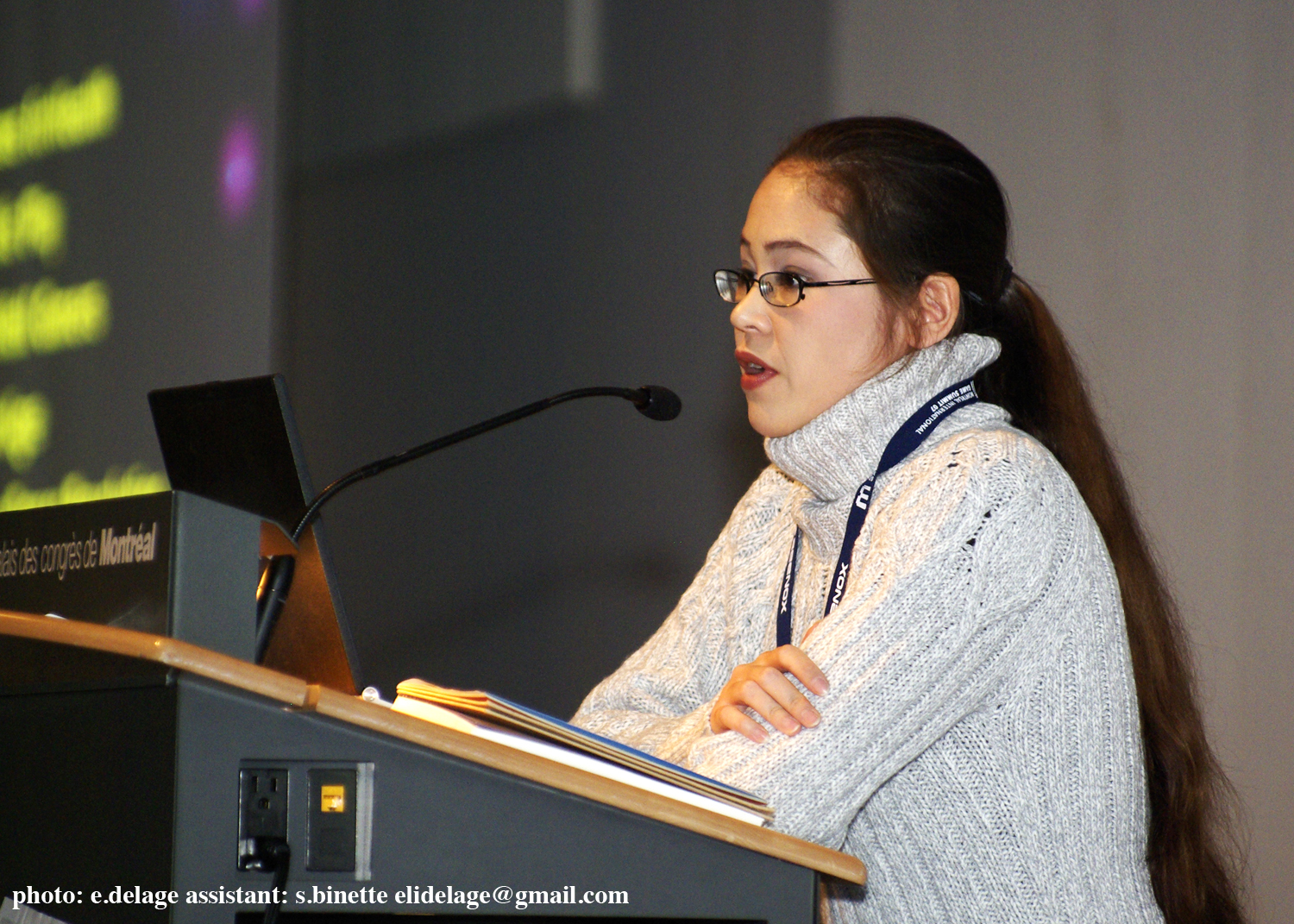
- Hoffman in 2007
- Born: 1981 (age 44–45)
- Education: Rensselaer Polytechnic Institute
- Occupation: Game designer
- Years active: 1999–present

Erin Hoffman (born 1981) is an American game developer, blogger, and fantasy writer. She has published three fantasy novels, and been the lead designer on multiple games such as Kung Fu Panda World, GoPets: Vacation Island, and Frontierville. Her anonymous post as a disgruntled "EA Spouse" in 2004, based on the working conditions of her husband who was an Electronic Arts developer, led to industry-wide awareness of the frequent use of "crunch time" overtime work to complete games in the video game industry.

== Game designer and author ==
Hoffman graduated from Rensselaer Polytechnic Institute in New York in 2003, where she majored in Philosophy. From 1999 to 2004, Hoffman was a contract game designer for Simutronics, working on the multiplayer game DragonRealms, after which she went on to become a contract game designer and director of online communities for GoPets, a pet-based virtual world startup based in Seoul, Korea. She then worked for 1st Playable Productions on handheld games, such as being lead designer on GoPets: Vacation Island (2008). From 2008 to 2011 she designed games for HumaNature Studios, such as Kung Fu Panda World.

In 2010, she was appointed to the board of directors of the International Game Developers Association, a position which she held until early 2011.

Also in 2011, Hoffman published her first novel, Sword of Fire and Sea, the first of the Chaos Knight trilogy of fantasy novels, which was followed by Lance of Earth and Sky (2012) and Shield of Sea and Space (2013). From September 2010 until October 2011, Hoffman was a Lead Systems Designer at Zynga, as Lead Systems Designer for FrontierVille. In December 2011, she joined the social game studio Loot Drop as a lead designer, creating the game Charmcraft Hollow (2011). As of 2015, she is a game designer at GlassLab.

== "EA Spouse" blog post ==
In 2004, Hoffman became known for an initially anonymous blog post under the name "EA Spouse". The post, made on November 11, 2004 to LiveJournal, sharply criticized the labor practices of Electronic Arts. It was widely distributed in the video game industry. In 2006, Hoffman's identity as the poster was made public.

Hoffman's actions, in part, led to the filing of three class action lawsuits against EA and some changes throughout the industry at large, such as the reclassification of entry-level artists as hourly employees, thus making them eligible for overtime under California law. Her fiancé, EA employee Leander Hasty, was the main plaintiff in the successful class-action suit on behalf of software engineers at EA, which in 2007 awarded the plaintiffs $14.9 million for unpaid overtime. After the affair and the court action, Hoffman and Hasty founded GameWatch, a watchdog organization meant to facilitate discussions between employees at different companies. It was closed in 2012.

== Works ==
=== Games ===
- 2014, Mars Generation One: Argubot Academy, GlassLab, Game Design Lead
- 2013, SimCityEDU, GlassLab, Game Design Lead
- 2013, Doki-Doki Universe, HumaNature Studios, design
- 2011, Charmcraft Hollow, Loot Drop, designer
- 2011, FrontierVille, Zynga, Lead Systems Designer, live team
- 2010, Kung Fu Panda World, HumaNature Studios, Lead Designer
- 2008, PuzzleSmash: Book of Secrets, Warm and Fuzzy Logic, Creative Director
- 2008, GoPets: Vacation Island, Lead Designer
- 2006, Cabbage Patch Kids: Patch Puppy Rescue, 1st Playable Productions, Assistant Game Designer, Writer
- 2004–2005, GoPets, Director of Online Communities
- 2004, Shadowbane: The Lost Kingdom, Taldren Pacific, Game Designer
- 1999–2004, DragonRealms, Simutronics, Assistant Game Designer, Races Assistant, World Builder

=== Nonfiction ===
- Settlers of the New Virtual Worlds, 2008, ISBN 978-1439203606

=== Novels ===
The Chaos Knight trilogy

1. Sword of Fire and Sea (2011), ISBN 978-1-61614-373-2
2. Lance of Earth and Sky (2012), ISBN 978-1-61614-615-3
3. Shield of Sea and Space (2013), ISBN 978-1-61614-769-3
