= ToeJam & Earl =

1991 video game

- North American box art
- Developer: Johnson Voorsanger Productions
- Publisher: Sega
- Producer: Scott Berfield
- Designer: Greg Johnson
- Programmer: Mark Voorsanger
- Composer: John Baker
- Series: ToeJam & Earl
- Platform: Genesis
- Release: NA: October 1991; EU: November 18, 1991; JP: March 13, 1992
- Genres: Action, roguelike
- Modes: Single-player, multiplayer

ToeJam & Earl is a 1991 action video game developed by Johnson Voorsanger Productions and published by Sega for the Genesis console. It centers on ToeJam and Earl—alien rappers who have crash-landed on Earth—as they attempt to escape the planet, players assume the role of either character and collect pieces of their wrecked spacecraft. It references and parodies 1980s and early-'90s urban culture and is set to a funk soundtrack. ToeJam & Earl's design was heavily influenced by the role-playing video game Rogue (1980) and derived various features from the game, such as the random generation of levels and items. As such, ToeJam & Earl is often considered to be an early example of a roguelike game.

The game was positively received by critics, who praised its originality, soundtrack, humor and two-player cooperative mode. It attained sleeper hit status despite low initial sales, and its protagonists were used as mascots by Sega. ToeJam & Earl was followed by two sequels: ToeJam & Earl in Panic on Funkotron and ToeJam & Earl III: Mission to Earth, released for the Genesis and Xbox, respectively. The sequels' commercial and critical performance were mixed. A fourth title, ToeJam & Earl: Back in the Groove, was released on March 1, 2019 without Sega's involvement, using funds from Kickstarter. The game was re-released for the Wii's Virtual Console on December 8, 2006 and re-released again on PlayStation Network and Xbox Live Arcade on November 6, 2012 as part of the Sega Vintage Collection. The game was also re-released on the Nintendo Classics service on December 16, 2021.

== Synopsis ==
ToeJam & Earl has been called a surreal, comic satire and a "daringly misanthropic commentary on Earthly life". ToeJam is red and has three legs. Earl possesses a stout build, with a solid and fat physique, and is orange. ToeJam wears a large gold medallion and a backwards baseball cap, while Earl is marked by high-tops and oversized sunglasses; both outfits are "over-the-top appropriations" of 1990s urban culture. Their speech features California slang. The game is set to a soundtrack which has been described both as jazz-funk, and as hip-hop. For the game's unique sound, composer John Baker was inspired by Herbie Hancock and The Headhunters.

In the game's opening sequence, ToeJam explains that Earl's erratic piloting abilities have resulted in a crash-landing on planet Earth. He says that they must find the widely scattered pieces of their spacecraft's wreckage to return to their home planet, Funkotron. The player guides the characters as they avoid Earth's antagonistic inhabitants and search for the debris. Should the player succeed, the final sequence depicts ToeJam and Earl escaping the planet in their reconstructed spacecraft. Under the player's control, the characters proceed across a purple landscape that represents Funkotron and are greeted by their friends and family.

== Gameplay ==
ToeJam (above) and Earl (below) explore floating islands which represent Earth, while avoiding "Earthlings" such as the devil seen on the top screen.

ToeJam & Earl takes place from a 3/4 perspective in a 2D game world. Its gameplay mechanics were inspired by Rogue, which has led it to be compared to genres like Roguelikes or dungeon-crawlers. The game contains both single-player and two-player cooperative modes. The latter displays a single screen when both characters are near each other, but splits it apart when they are not. Playing the game with two players reveals dialogue and jokes between the characters not heard in the single player game.

The game is set on Earth, which is represented by randomly generated islands that float in space, each one a layer above the last. They are connected by elevators. Some islands contain pieces of spacecraft wreckage, of which the player must collect 10 to win the game. The player character drops to the island below if he falls from an island's edge, which necessitates that the player again locate an elevator. Each island is populated by antagonistic "Earthlings", such as phantom ice-cream trucks, aggressive packs of "nerds", giant hamsters, Bogeymen, man-eating mailboxes, and chickens armed with mortars that shoot tomatoes. Certain Earthlings aid the player. The game has been described as "largely non-violent", as the protagonists can only attack enemies with thrown tomatoes—one of many temporary, randomly generated power-ups.

Power-ups are contained in wrapped presents, which are categorized by appearance. The contents of a present are unknown to the player until it is opened; afterwards, all presents of that appearance are identified. A certain type of NPC wearing a carrot costume will also identify presents for a fee. Presents with question marks can hold any item at random, so their contents cannot be identified on sight alone. Identification of presents' contents is a central gameplay mechanic. Each power-up has a unique effect: while one might increase the player characters' running speed, another distracts enemies. Certain presents contain harmful power-ups, such as the "Total Bummer" which causes the player to lose a "life", or the "Randomizer" which resets the identity of all presents. In the game's cooperative mode, if one player character opens a present in the vicinity of the other, its contents affect both characters. As players open more presents, the chances of accidentally opening the Randomizer are increased, which prevents the game from becoming easier as more presents are identified.

== Development ==
ToeJam & Earl creator Greg Johnson became a fan of Rogue as a university student. After he left university, he worked on games for Electronic Arts, including Starflight (1986). After the completion of Starflight 2, Johnson conceived ToeJam & Earl—first the characters, then the plot—while on a beach in Hawaii. The idea was a combination of Rogue's gameplay concepts and a lighter version of Starflight's science-fiction themes. Johnson met programmer Mark Voorsanger through a mutual friend, while walking on Mount Tam in 1989. He related the concept of ToeJam & Earl to Voorsanger, and the two resolved to make the game together. They formed Johnson Voorsanger Productions, and serious work on the game began soon after. Their status as commercial game designers allowed them to meet with Sega of America, and they used cards covered in landscape drawings to demonstrate their idea of randomly generated levels. Sega marketing manager Hugh Bowen was immediately interested in the concept, and he enlisted the aid of producer Scott Berfield to sell the game to management; Sega wanted innovative games and new mascots to compete with Nintendo.

The game's small development team was composed of Johnson's previous colleagues, and its music was composed by John Baker. Johnson himself did the game's art and provided the character voices. The team's goal was to make a humorous game that was "original, easy to understand and offered an immediate response to the player's actions". The designers wanted to include a two-player mode so that they could play together, and they considered ToeJam & Earl "a two player game with a one player option." While Sega believed that hardware issues would prevent the feature from working, Voorsanger successfully implemented it. In a 1992 interview with Sega Visions, Johnson stated that the characters ToeJam and Earl evolved as reflections of his and Voorsanger's personalities. Voorsanger disagreed and called the characters "two different aspects of Greg's personality". Steve Purcell has stated that he contributed character designs to the game.

== Reception ==
Reception

Review scores
| Publication | Score |
|---|---|
| Electronic Gaming Monthly | 6/10, 8/10, 7/10, 8/10 |
| Famitsu | 7/10, 6/10, 7/10, 7/10 |
| Game Informer | 7.5/10, 9.5/10, 9.7/10 |
| Mean Machines | 87% |
| MegaTech | 87% |
| Mega | 91% |
| Sega Pro | 93% |

ToeJam & Earl received positive reviews, which Bill Paris of UGO described as "almost unanimous critical acclaim". However, Sega deemed it a commercial failure due to low initial sales. The game built a cult following through word of mouth, and it was further aided by the Sega Genesis's Christmas 1991 sales spike, caused by the release of Sonic the Hedgehog. ToeJam & Earl was later considered a "cult" success. In the words of historian Ken Horowitz "In all, the game sold 350,000 copies for Sega, a remarkable feat for such an unconventional title on a fledgling console." Entertainment Weekly picked the game as the ninth-greatest game available in 1991, saying: "Simply hilarious, from the Warner Bros. cartoon-inspired sound effects to the rap songs players can improvise while using the control pad".

Mean Machines found the game addictive and original, but found fault with its slow-paced combat. One of the reviewers said, "Not everyone will like it—it's not normal enough for mass appeal—but I think it's destined to become a massive cult classic". GamePro called the game's originality "incredible" and praised its graphics, music and humor. MegaTech praised the graphics, and the 2-player option, and said the game was "great fun—pure and simple".

Mega said that it was "An OK game, but one which becomes completely essential when played with someone else. Got any friends? Buy this. Haven't got any friends? Buy this and make some". The game also appeared at number 26 on its list of the best games of all time. Entertainment Weekly praised the "absolutely hilarious" sound effects and music. Jeff Csatari of Boys' Life called it "another hot game" for the Sega Genesis, alongside Sonic the Hedgehog. Ed Martinez of Game Informer commended the game's soundtrack and unique concept, but found it to be too easy.

A review published in both the Chicago Tribune and Rome News-Tribune likened ToeJam and Earl to "an outer-space, rap version of Abbott and Costello". The reviewers called it "the funniest game we've seen in a long time" and praised its soundtrack, graphics and action.

The Toronto Star acclaimed the game's "hilariously designed split-screen two-player mode", and said, "If you've got a Sega-Genesis system, you simply must check out [this] awesome rap 'n' roll game". Sega Visions praised the game's "no-repetitive action" and said, "This is the zaniest game that ever rocked Sega's Genesis system." Several months after the game's release, Mega ranked it the 13th-best Sega Genesis game in its All-Time Top 100 feature. The magazine praised the game's "superbly manic and zany action" and deemed it both "original and insane". The Channel 4 video game programme GamesMaster gave the game a 70% rating.

ToeJam & Earl was re-released on the Nintendo Wii's Virtual Console in 2006. Official Nintendo Magazine scored the game 85% and praised its humor, originality and two-player mode. However, the reviewer believed that the game's enjoyability had diminished with time. GameSpot felt that the game's 1990s idioms were dated, but that the gameplay—particularly the two-player mode—was still enjoyable by modern standards. Jeremy Parish of 1UP found the game's two-player co-operative mode more enjoyable than its single-player and described the graphics and sound as "oddly primitive". Parish considered it "one of the best games to hit VC to date". Eurogamer's reviewer negatively received the game and believed its gameplay to be unsatisfying and overly slow. IGN called the game's visuals a "mixed bag" and derided the slow pace, but praised its unpredictability and believed that its sound design was "one thing you absolutely can't fault".

== Legacy ==
ToeJam and Earl became one of Sega's second-tier mascots, alongside Sonic, and one of the Sega Genesis's key exclusive franchises. The characters appeared in a spin-off light gun game, Ready, Aim, Tomatoes, developed by Johnson Voorsanger Productions as one of six mini-games for the Menacer 6-Game Cartridge. In early 1992, the developers began work on a sequel to ToeJam & Earl and spent three months expanding on the original game's concept by adding indoor areas and more terrain types. Sega was not impressed by the sequel and believed it to be unmarketable. The team redesigned it as a platform game, as Sega were inclined to publish games in this genre. The game, titled ToeJam & Earl in Panic on Funkotron, was highly anticipated, and it was a commercial and critical success when it released in 1993. However, fans of the original game were disappointed by the change in design to a perceived generic style. Due to poor relations between Johnson Voorsanger Productions and Sega, which held the ToeJam & Earl rights until 1995, the ToeJam & Earl franchise was neglected. A ToeJam & Earl game planned for the Dreamcast was cancelled (a beta of the game was preserved and, on Christmas Day 2013, released on the internet by enthusiasts), but a third installment, ToeJam & Earl III: Mission to Earth, was released for the Xbox in 2002. The release returned to the concepts of the original game, but generated mixed reviews and poor sales. In 2019, ToeJam & Earl: Back in the Groove was released, which was essentially an enhanced remake of the original game. ToeJam and Earl also appeared as a tag-team playable character in 2021's Mighty Fight Federation.

ToeJam & Earl has been called "weird", "strange", and "thoroughly odd". Critics have difficulty in determining a genre for the game; it has been called a platform game and roguelike, as well as action and action-adventure. While ToeJam & Earl's success did not match that of the Sega Genesis's other popular titles, it has been considered a "classic", and a "cult" game. Prior to ToeJam & Earl III's conception, research by its developers found that the original ToeJam & Earl was preferred over its sequel. In an IGN survey, 65% of respondents cited it as their favorite of the three games.

ToeJam & Earl was re-released on the Nintendo Wii's Virtual Console in 2006. The game was set to be re-released on Xbox Live Arcade after winning a poll arranged by Sega, but this became uncertain because Johnson owns the rights to the characters rather than Sega. The game, along with its sequel, was announced as part of Sega Vintage Collection series for release on November 7, 2012, to be released individually on PlayStation Network and as a collection on Xbox Live Arcade. A remake of the game has been announced for release exclusively for the Intellivision Amico. The notion of a ToeJam & Earl game for the Nintendo DS failed to generate interest from publishers, but Johnson has reiterated the possibility of such a game in the future. Greg Johnson later gave ToeJam and Earl a comeback with a new game called ToeJam & Earl: Back in the Groove, which was made through Kickstarter fundraising by his own independent company HumaNature Studios. Greg Johnson said he was able to make a new ToeJam & Earl game without needing a publisher, since the popularity of downloadable independent games, but Adult Swim Games came to publish the game as well as for retail copies. ToeJam & Earl would later influence the American animated series Regular Show, which J. G. Quintel has played as a kid, and later described it as "the perfect platform" for Regular Show protagonists Mordecai and Rigby.

=== Film adaptation ===
On December 5, 2022, it was announced that a ToeJam & Earl movie is in development from Amazon MGM Studios with Stephen Curry producing through his production company Unanimous Media along with producing partner Erick Peyton, as well as Dmitri M. Johnson, Michael Lawrence Goldberg and Timothy I. Stevenson of Story Kitchen. The game's creators Voorsanger and Johnson are set to executive produce, with Amos Vernon and Nunzio Randazzo writing the script.
