= ToeJam & Earl: Back in the Groove =

- Developer: HumaNature Studios
- Publishers: HumaNature Studios; Limited Run Games (Physical PS4 and Switch versions)
- Director: Greg Johnson
- Producers: Matt Conn; Macaulay Culkin
- Designer: Greg Johnson
- Programmers: Jeff Kreis; Christopher Hall; Ko Costarella
- Artists: Nathan Shorts; Rick Servande; Connie Chin
- Composers: Cody Wright; Nick Stubblefield
- Series: ToeJam & Earl
- Engine: Unity
- Platforms: Linux, macOS, Nintendo Switch, PlayStation 4, Windows, Xbox One
- Release: March 1, 2019
- Genre: Action platformer
- Modes: Single-player, multiplayer

ToeJam & Earl: Back in the Groove is the fourth entry in the ToeJam & Earl series of video games. The game was developed by HumaNature Studios, founded by series creator Greg Johnson, and published by the studio on March 1, 2019.

It is the first new entry in the series since 2002's ToeJam & Earl III: Mission to Earth, as well as the first entry that Sega had no involvement with. The physical release features a standard red cover design as well as a purple cover variant sold exclusively through Best Buy.

== Gameplay ==
The game plays most similarly to the original ToeJam & Earl game for the Sega Genesis. The game plays from a fixed, isometric viewpoint, and features the same basic gameplay of searching and exploring up a successive layer of floating islands. While it mostly does not play like the game's vastly different sequel, ToeJam & Earl in Panic on Funkotron, it implements some of the minor side aspects of it, such as the "Jam Out" rhythm-based mini-game. The game features nine different playable characters, and four-player cooperative gameplay, both online and locally.

== Development ==
The game was developed by HumaNature Studios, the company founded by ToeJam and Earl series creator Greg Johnson. Work on the game's premise started shortly after the team's prior game release, Doki-Doki Universe, which released December 2013. After teasing that the team had been busy working on the game's premise in early 2015, the game was formally announced in March 2015. The game's original plan was to forgo securing a publisher, in favor of raising funds through crowd sourcing. The team ran a Kickstarter campaign throughout the month of March, with a goal of raising $400,000 to fund the game. The game's goal was met on March 25, two days before the campaign's end, and ended up at over $500,000 as the total amount, successfully funding the game, but failing to meet the stretch goals required to get the game released on traditional video game consoles, instead being relegated to the Linux, macOS, Microsoft Windows. The team, at the time, consisted of just three people - Johnson, an engineer, and an artist.

Initially scheduled for a 2016 release, in August 2016, it was announced that Adult Swim Games had joined on to publish and give additional funding for the project. This allowed for the game's release on additional video game platforms, but did not specify which ones, and delayed the game into 2017. While Adult Swim Games was publishing the game, the deal did not involve the creation of any sort of animated cartoon for its Adult Swim television broadcast. On February 28, 2017, during a Nintendo Direct focused around indie and crowd-funded games coming to Nintendo platforms, the Nintendo Switch was revealed to be one of the platforms the game would be released on, with more to be announced. Versions for PlayStation 4 and Xbox One were confirmed in April. In June 2018, it was announced that Adult Swim Games would no longer be publishing the game. It was ultimately self-published digitally by HumaNature Studios in early 2019. Limited Run Games published physical editions for PlayStation 4 and Nintendo Switch.

Actor Macaulay Culkin, a longtime fan of the series, connected with Johnson after he praised the games on his podcast, Bunny Ears. As executive producer, Culkin gave his input on the game's development.

== Reception ==
Reception

Aggregate score
Aggregator	Score
Metacritic	(PC) 76/100 (PS4) 66/100 (NS) 75/100 (XONE) 70/100

Review scores
Publication	Score
Computer Games Magazine	6.5/10
Destructoid	9.5/10
Electronic Gaming Monthly	4/5
Game Informer	8/10
GameRevolution	8/10
GameSpot	5/10
Nintendo World Report	8.5/10
Push Square	6/10
RPGamer	3/5
Shacknews	7/10

According to review aggregator Metacritic, ToeJam and Earl: Back in the Groove received "generally favorable reviews" on Nintendo Switch and PC, and "mixed or average reviews" on PlayStation 4 and Xbox One.

=== Awards ===
The game was nominated for the Freedom Tower Award for Best Remake at the New York Game Awards, and for "Game, Classic Revival" at the NAVGTR Awards.
