= Protostar: War on the Frontier =

1993 video game

- Developer: Tsunami Media
- Publisher: Tsunami Media
- Designer: Vas Nokhoudian
- Platform: MS-DOS
- Release: 1993
- Genre: Role-playing game
- Mode: Single-player

Protostar: War on the Frontier is a 1993 science fiction video game produced by Tsunami Media that blends elements of role-playing, space exploration, space combat, and strategy. The player commands a spaceship from a first-person perspective in real-time capable of traveling to the various planets in the game world and launching an explorer vessel to traverse their surfaces. Several sentient alien races inhabit the region with whom the player interacts through friendly conversation, intense spaceship combat, or barter at their planetary trading posts. One of these races, the Skeetch, is aggressively threatening to conquer the Earth; the player has been recruited to convince the other sentient races in the region to join humanity in an alliance against the Skeetch. A secondary goal of the game is to earn money by performing actions such as selling alien lifeforms and minerals collected on planetary surfaces to obtain the funds needed to upgrade the player's spaceship and improve the odds of survival in confrontations with the Skeetch and other hostile entities. Computer Gaming World criticized the game for failing to break new ground and for its "muddled" blend of science fiction themes, but did recommend it to players new to this genre.

The game's working title during the first six months of development was Starflight 3 as it was originally intended to be a sequel to Starflight and Starflight 2: Trade Routes of the Cloud Nebula. The released game no longer retains a relationship to the Starflight game world because Tsunami Media's collaboration with Electronic Arts, the Starflight copyright owner, did not work out. However, the basic framework of exploration, diplomacy, trade, combat, and spaceship upgrades still bears strong resemblances to the Starflight games. A sequel, Protostar 2, was planned but never released.

== Gameplay ==
As the game begins, the player character is in command a poorly equipped spaceship docked at one of the game's three space stations. Each station provides the player with a variety of services including:

- Communications Terminal: displays announcements and provides a contact line to the Human Defense Forces.
- Exchange Center: a place to sell various goods such as minerals and lifeforms.
- Biotech Center: disabled crew members may be revived for a fee.
- Frontier Craft: buys and sells spacecraft accessories including engines, weapons, and shields.
- Lounge: a place to converse with non-player characters possessing useful information.

The player's spaceship may be outfitted with a variety of engines, defensive systems, and weapons. Available weapons include wave guns and accel cannons, distinguished by an inverse proportionality in their recharge rate and ability to inflict damage, and pursuit pods (guided torpedoes). Two types of defensive systems are available: dampening fields and energy shields, which provide some protection against wave guns and accel cannons respectively. The spaceship is already equipped with an explorer vessel used for exploring planetary surfaces. It has a particle gun for self-defense.

Both the spaceship and the explorer vessel feature cockpits containing icons through which orders are given to various crew members such as the navigator and biotech officer. Players command both craft in real-time from a first-person perspective by selecting an icon representing the commander's control pad, which translates movement of the mouse into corresponding motions of the spaceship or explorer vessel. During combat the mouse buttons are used to control the selection and firing of the ship's weapons. Some encounters with other spaceships result in peaceful conversations which yield important clues or provide opportunities for the player to befriend one of the region's native alien races. The player's spaceship is capable of hopping between solar systems via hyperpath tunnels, making regional journeys within a solar system, and making short-range maneuvers in circumstances such as spaceship combat. It may enter orbit around any planet in a solar system and perform a scan to gain information on that planet's general characteristics and topography. Using the topographic map generated by a scan, the player can choose a landing site. After doing so, the spaceship's crew transfers to the explorer vessel which undocks from the orbiting spaceship and lands on the planet. The player drives the explorer vessel around on the planet's surface to collect saleable minerals and lifeforms and, on inhabited worlds, to locate alien trading posts at which the player may barter with the alien race to whom the planet belongs.

== Plot ==
The player character is a covert agent operating in a region of space where an antagonistic race of aliens known as the Skeetch are gaining power. As the Skeetch are currently waging war against Earth, the Protostar Initiative is launched in an attempt to convince four alien races to ally with the Human Defense Forces and disrupt the Skeetch supply lines through the region. As in the Starflight games, the initial goal is to upgrade the poorly-equipped spaceship with which a player begins the game with the best available accessories and assemble a well-trained crew. Moreover, the Human Defense Forces require financial support so that they are able to continue resisting the Skeetch. Accomplishing these goals requires the player to assemble a trained crew and earn money by, for example, scouring planets for saleable minerals and lifeforms.

Convincing the four alien races to ally with humanity is primarily a matter of discerning what each race needs and providing a solution that fulfils the need. Two of these races have a similar problem; some of their members are being held captive and require rescue. Another race, the Ghebberant, lives on a resource-poor planet and needs the player's help to find a more suitable world for them to colonize. A fourth race, the Kaynik, are aggressive warriors who initially attack the player's spaceship. Once the player has successfully demonstrated an ability to defeat their vessels in battle, surrendering without a fight in several subsequent encounters causes them to become bewildered and thereby opens a line of communication with them. Through the ensuing conversation, they can be shown the importance of joining a larger, multi-species alliance. Once these alliances are formed, the player's spaceship becomes embroiled in a battle with a Skeetch dreadnought that determines the outcome of the game; destroying it secures victory for the alliance against the Skeetch threat.

== Development ==
In November 1992, Computer Gaming World published an article by composer Ken Allen where he mentions his ongoing work on the game that would become Protostar, described at the time as "Starflight 3 (Tsunami Media and Electronic Arts)". Collaboration between the two companies ended "due to various business reasons" after the game had already been in development for about six months. Tsunami Media was permitted to reuse the artwork and source code that it had already produced, but as Electronic Arts holds the copyright on Starflight, it had to "turn that into something else" unrelated to the Starflight game world. Designer Vas Nokhoudian states that this led to a change in the game's "focus and feel" with less diplomacy and a shift to a more open-ended "play how you want it" structure.

== Reception ==
Reception

Review scores
Publication	Score
All Game Guide	2.5/5
Computer Gaming World	1/5

Computer Gaming World reviewer Paul Schuytema recommended the game to those new to the genre, but described it as a "solid, albeit uninspired game" that "comes up short" in breaking new ground. Noting the game's resemblance to Starflight and Star Control, he wrote that the game's "incredible graphics" do "a very convincing job of creating a world which suspends visual disbelief" and that the control interface "melds into [the game's] cockpit concept, giving the player easy control of every aspect of the game with intuitive mouse movements". Schuytema criticized the game manual's brevity which leaves the player unsure as to what needs to be accomplished, and elements that quickly become tedious such as space combat, in which even a "simple battle" required over twenty minutes in real time.

In a 1994 survey of strategic space video games in Computer Gaming World, M. Evan Brooks wrote that the game "lacks its own identity" on account of its amalgamation of classic science fiction "ideas that have all been used before". He gave the game one out of five stars and concluded that it "doesn't even stand out as an adventure game, so muddled is it in concept and execution".

== Legacy ==
In an interview distributed with the CD-ROM version of the game, Nokhoudian revealed his design goals for a projected sequel, Protostar 2, that would have continued the original game's storyline. He anticipated that the sequel, set in a new region of space featuring new alien races, would be more action-oriented and have a more streamlined interface.
