= JVP =

JVP may stand for:

- Janatha Vimukthi Peramuna, People's Liberation Front, a Sri Lankan communist political party
- Jerusalem Venture Partners, an Israeli-American media venture capital firm
- Jewish Voice for Peace, an American advocacy organization concerned with the Israeli-Palestinian conflict
- Johnson Voorsanger Productions, original name of ToeJam & Earl Productions
- Journal of Vertebrate Paleontology, a scientific journal
- Jugular venous pressure, an important marker elicited during clinical examination to assess right heart function
- Jyotirvidya Parisanstha, Oldest association of amateur astronomers in India
