= ToeJam & Earl III: Mission to Earth =

2002 video game

- Developers: ToeJam & Earl Productions; Visual Concepts Entertainment
- Publisher: Sega
- Director: Greg Johnson
- Designer: Greg Johnson
- Composer: Burke Trieschmann
- Series: ToeJam & Earl
- Platform: Xbox
- Release: NA: October 22, 2002; EU: March 7, 2003
- Genres: Action-adventure, platform
- Modes: Single-player, multiplayer

ToeJam & Earl III: Mission to Earth is an action-adventure video game released for the Xbox on October 22, 2002. Developed by ToeJam & Earl Productions and Visual Concepts, and published by Sega, it is the third installment in the ToeJam & Earl series. Players assume the role of one of three extraterrestrial protagonists: ToeJam and Earl, who starred in the series' first two games, and Latisha, a new character. While using power-ups to combat enemies, players seek to collect the twelve "Sacred Albums of Funk" and defeat the antagonistic "Anti-Funk."

The original two ToeJam & Earl games were a key Sega Genesis franchise, but development of a third game was prevented by disharmony between ToeJam & Earl Productions and original publisher Sega. Versions of ToeJam & Earl III developed at different times for the Nintendo 64 and the Dreamcast were canceled, but the latter was completed for the Xbox. On release, the game met with poor sales and mixed reviews; while certain critics found its gameplay innovative, its humor, soundtrack and graphics were variously praised and derided. Opinions of the game's overall enjoyability and longevity were also mixed.

This was the last game in the ToeJam & Earl series until 2019's Back in the Groove, which was made without Sega's involvement.

== Synopsis ==
ToeJam & Earl III follows the extraterrestrial protagonists ToeJam and Earl, who starred in the series' previous games, and a sassy new female character named Latisha. ToeJam is lanky, three-legged and red; Earl is overweight and orange. Their characterization has been described as a "celebration" or "parody" of hip hop and urban culture. Latisha has been variously described as "feisty" and "brimming with attitude" by critics.

In the cutscenes, their dialogue and dialect portray them as African American.

== Plot ==
ToeJam, Earl, and Latisha embark on a journey to Earth, in order to retrieve the stolen twelve Sacred Albums of Funk and return them to Lamont the Funkopotamus. Levels take place on terrains that represent Earth's ecosystems. The game's ultimate antagonist is the Anti-Funk, whose defeat will "save the world from all that is unfunky." The "funk" has been described as a parody of the Force from Star Wars, with the Anti-Funk being the dark side.

== Gameplay ==
ToeJam (above) evades an Earthling, while Earl (below) explores the game world.

The game has been called both a platform game and an action-adventure game. GameSpot asserts that it combines elements of ToeJam & Earl and its platformer sequel, ToeJam & Earl in Panic on Funkotron, while GameNOW and Electronic Gaming Monthly liken it to the former game. The game features both single- and two-player modes; in both, players control one of the three protagonists. ToeJam moves quickly and jumps high, but has weak attacks; Earl is tougher and has more powerful attacks, but is slow and jumps lower than ToeJam; Latisha ranks between the two in terms of athleticism, and gains additional power-ups later in the game. In the game's two-player mode, the camera moves between single and split-screen as players maneuver their characters away from each other. Characters can share power-ups when in close proximity.

The game's randomly generated levels are connected together by hubs. Additional levels could be downloaded from Xbox Live. Level exploration is based around collecting items: the player searches for the Sacred Albums of Funk, and for keys that grant access to more levels. Enemies include rabbit ninja, a "demented chicken," and "psycho cheerleaders," which the player combats with Funk-Fu and Funk Notes. Funk Notes are projectiles that render enemies "funkified," or harmless; more powerful than Funk-Fu, they require the player to gather ammunition. The player may also find wrapped presents, which contain power-ups such as rocket skates, spring shoes and food; these variously grant greater defensive abilities, access to certain areas, and additional health. Another power-up involves a simple rhythm game, and leaves nearby enemies "funkified" if the player successfully copies on-screen rhythms.

== Development ==
ToeJam & Earl and its sequel ToeJam & Earl in Panic on Funkotron together formed one of the Sega Genesis' main series. However, series creator Greg Johnson said that installments for the console's Sega CD or 32X add-ons were never planned. Johnson and programmer Mark Voorsanger regained the rights to ToeJam and Earl in 1995, and stated that Sega's ownership of the franchise had prevented their creating a third installment. In early 1998, they expressed interest in making a new ToeJam & Earl game for a non-Sega platform, and in November 1998, made an agreement with GT Interactive to publish a new game in the franchise for the Nintendo 64. Johnson and Voorsanger conducted research to determine whether series fans preferred the original ToeJam & Earl or its sequel; the former emerged as the clear favorite. In April 1999, however, it was reported that the deal with GT Interactive had fallen through; the publisher had decided that the series' previous game was not an encouraging success commercially, particularly in Europe. GT Interactive's restructuring and the Nintendo 64's declining commercial performance were also believed to be factors by commentators.

It was reported the following month that the developer was planning to create the game for Sony's PlayStation 2, perhaps to coincide with the console's release. Ultimately, however, the developer became involved with Sega's Dreamcast through Visual Concepts—a Sega developer in charge of third-party game development. Johnson and Voorsanger began development of the third game with the intention to re-make ToeJam & Earl; according to Johnson, the game would include the same elements as the first game, but with improved graphics. However, this notion was curtailed by Visual Concepts, who felt that the result would be too old-fashioned, and too niche in appeal. Johnson later said that he was unsure, at the time, whether to cater to fans who wanted a remake of the original or attempt to capture a new audience.

Visual Concepts assisted with the development process, as ToeJam & Earl Productions was struggling with the game's technical demands. Johnson and Voorsanger indicated the development of a new character with the game's working title, "ToeJam, Earl, and Latisha." Rapper and TLC member Lisa Lopes nearly signed on to provide the voice of the game's new character Latisha, however financial disagreements with Lopes' agent caused the deal to cease. Actress Sherrie Jackson provided the character's voice instead. The game was previewed at E3 in 2001, but Sega subsequently cancelled its support of the Dreamcast due to poor commercial performance. Once again, Johnson's preferred format was the PlayStation 2 or Nintendo GameCube, but the developer ultimately ported the game to Microsoft's Xbox because of its technical simplicity, as well as free advertising offered to Sega by Microsoft. Promotional copies of the game portrayed the Anti-Funk as a disembodied head reminiscent of a Ku Klux Klan mask—an anti-racism statement, according to Johnson. Sega vetoed this, however, and the character was changed to a skull design for the game's retail release.

In September 2013, an unreleased Dreamcast version of ToeJam & Earl III: Mission to Earth was found on a Katana Development Kit. Sega was asked to approve its release, but no response was ever received. Johnson and Voorsanger agreed to a community release soon afterward, and the Dreamcast prototype became available for public download in 2018.

== Reception ==
Reception

Aggregate score
| Aggregator | Score |
|---|---|
| Metacritic | 71/100 |

Review scores
| Publication | Score |
|---|---|
| AllGame | 3.5/5 |
| Edge | 7/10 |
| Electronic Gaming Monthly | 7.17/10 |
| Eurogamer | 7/10 |
| Game Informer | 6/10 |
| GamePro | 4.5/5 |
| GameSpot | 5/10 |
| GameSpy | 3/5 |
| GameZone | 8.3/10 |
| IGN | 6.3/10 |
| Official Xbox Magazine (US) | 8.2/10 |
| Entertainment Weekly | B− |
| The Guardian | 3/5 |

The game received "average" reviews according to the review aggregation website Metacritic. IGN asserted that the game was "thrashed soundly by critics", and GameSpot named it the year's most disappointing Xbox game. Computer and Video Games lauded its "superb sense of humour and the kind of offbeat gameplay that shows up every other identikit shooter, stealth 'em up and extreme sports title as imagination-devoid shams." PC World praised the game's "laugh out loud" humor, and acclaimed the two-player mode as "damned good fun."

GameNOW and Electronic Gaming Monthly praised the game's power-ups, whose strategic element the former enjoyed, and two-player mode. However, GameNOW derided the game's hip-hop dialogue, and Electronic Gaming Monthly found it repetitive; the latter also believed that Latisha was an unnecessary addition. Game Informer found the hip-hop theme to be embarrassingly dated, and likened the game to In Living Color and The Fresh Prince of Bel Air. The reviewer also believed that its randomly generated levels necessitated "simple and arbitrary" mission goals.

Eurogamer praised the game's graphics, camera angles and mini-games, but complained about unfair enemies, annoying character accents and an arbitrary mix of musical genres. The reviewer believed that "[the game,] in the final analysis[,] is just not good enough to warrant spending £40." IGN gave it a "passable" verdict: Reviewer Kaiser Hwang felt that the game's brief initial appeal quickly gave way to repetition. He had a mixed opinion of its graphics, with praise given to the character animations, but criticism to perceived poor draw distance. GameSpot deemed the game "mediocre." The reviewer noted that "the humor almost always falls flat," and that "ToeJam's speech [...] is filled with stupid double entendres." The website found the soundtrack to be dated, and called the game's audio "a serious disappointment."

The Guardian gave the game three stars out of five and praised the originality of the characters, and the "crisply defined textures and realistic lighting"; the paper deemed the game "a treat for the eyes." However, Greg Howson decided that the game was merely average overall, and noted its limited longevity. The Las Vegas Review-Journal wrote of the game: "It's all right, but probably most useful for certain parents to force on kids." The Sydney Morning Herald gave the game three stars out of five and described it as "an average platform game that masks its conventional gameplay with over-stimulating graphics." The Daily Mirror called it "anarchic, fun, hilarious and very cool." Entertainment Weekly gave it a B− and wrote that "TJ&E is fun -- but forgettable fun. Still, its promise of downloadable content, and sheer silliness, brings some whimsy to the funk-starved Xbox."
