= Erik Bethke =

- Born: September 22, 1972 (age 53); Los Angeles, California
- Occupation: Game developer

Erik Bethke is a computer games developer.

Bethke worked on UV Spectrometer experiments under Dr. D.E. Shemanksy at the Jet Propulsion Laboratory and the University of Southern California, but did not complete his PhD studies in Space Sciences.

He began a career in the games industry working on GoPets, GoDance, Star Trek: Starfleet Command, Star Trek: Starfleet Command II: Empires at War and Star Trek: Starfleet Command: Orion Pirates.

His first book, Game Development and Production, describing the methodology of creating games; was edited by Ray Muzyka and Greg Zeschuk, Co-CEOs of BioWare. A subsequent book, Settlers of the New Virtual Worlds, co-edited with Erin Hoffman, explored human and property rights in virtual worlds, and highlighted current End User License Agreements (EULAs).

In 2003 Bethke moved to Seoul, Korea and founded GoPets, Ltd. which was acquired by social gaming company Zynga. Bethke worked at Zynga from 2009 to 2012 as the General Manager of Mafia Wars 2.

In September 2012, Bethke co-founded Bee Cave Games with Nimai Malle and Jeremy Strauser - a social and mobile game developer focused on the casino sector and makers of Blackjack Casino.

== Bibliography ==
- Bethke, Erik. Game Development and Production. Wordware game developer's library. Plano, Tex: Wordware Pub, 2003. ISBN 978-0-585-44833-6
- Bethke, Erik; Hoffman, Erin (August 13, 2008). Settlers of the New Virtual Worlds. BookSurge Publishing. p. 212. ISBN 978-1-4392-0360-6.
