= GoPets =

Virtual pet website

GoPets Ltd.
- Type: Online Game, Entertainment Service, Online Social Network
- Industry: Internet, Online Game Development
- Founded: August 4, 2004
- Headquarters: Seoul, South Korea
- Key people: Erik Bethke - CEO
- Number of employees: 55 (as of October 2006)
- Website: www.gopets.net - no longer active or www.gopetslive.com - no longer active

GoPets was a virtual pet site that involved raising a customized three-dimensional pet downloaded onto a user's computer. GoPets was launched on August 4, 2005 and shut down on November 8, 2009.

GoPets resided not only on their owners' computers, but also visited GoPets members around the world when sent, invited or when pets decided to travel on their own.

To provide a means of communication among users who spoke different languages, GoPets had a unique universal message system called "IKU." The GoPets service also contained chat services and a forum.

== Pets ==
Players on GoPets had the ability to create a pet. After selecting which animal they desired, they had the opportunity to customize their new GoPet by selecting from a list of pre-set colors and patterns. Once the initial creation process was complete, the GoPet was brought into existence to reside on the player's desktop.

If players desired further customization, they could dress their pet up with unique clothing items, and equip different transportation vehicles such as cars or planes. Many equippable items held trainable animations that GoPets could be taught to use when their stats were at a certain level.

GoPets were social, and enjoyed interacting with other GoPets. These interactions included conversations, games, and professions of love and friendship which may result in a communal dance. GoPets loved to travel around desktops of players all around the world in search of other places where there were treated politely and affectionately.

In-game, GoPets never died or became sick, despite the lack of care or how low their status might have become. They would respond negatively to ill care and leave their owners' desktop frequently or, when very tired, fall asleep.

== GoLand ==
GoLand was a GoPets term referring to a players desktop. New users were taken to a community desktop where books, food and clothing are able to be purchased. A user could purchase their own piece of GoLand by using the GoLand Map and searching for either a camping site or a tier 1 land. Camping sites were shown by a green paw, and only cost 1000 green shells; while the tier 1 lands were shown by an orange paw and cost 75 gold shells. Camping sites only allowed 75 items to be placed onto the desktop, while a tier 1 land allowed 250 items for non-subscribers, and 400 items for premium subscribers.

Players could decorate their desktop with countless objects and toys for GoPets to play and interact with. GoPets could use many of the items by themselves. One popular item was a bathtub, which GoPets would utilize when their cleanliness status is low. In addition to toys and food, GoPets owners could place decorative items on the desktop, such as trees, shrubs or ponds. They could also mark items for sale, allowing visitors to their desktop to purchase these items at will.

== Currency ==
The GoPets currency was known as the shell (they are simply colored seashells); green shells were the lowest denomination, pink shells were second, and gold shells were considered the most valuable. Gold Shells could be purchased for real money through Gopets, for US$0.10 per shell. At the trading forum, some players traded shells for another, but the exchange rate could be rather outrageous ((100 gold shell: 500 pink shells: 20000 green shells)). All types of shells, as well as numerous items, could be found in fortune cookies; Green Tea Fortune Cookies were given Daily to un-subscribed users, while special Premium Fortune Cookies were given to the Subscribers.

The player's currency of Gold Shells to Pink Shells to Green Shells changed after GoPets discovered a flaw in their fortune cookie system which gave a higher payout of gold shells than a person who would buy the prepaid cards. Due to this, GoPets changed and revised the fortune cookie system making a daily maximum payout of 10 Gold Shells from pink fortune cookies.

Pink shells could only be used by Subscribers.

== Gameplay ==
Users could interact with the GoPets on their desktop, by feeding them, petting them, playing with them, sending them to other players. GoPets could own micropets, little pets for your pets. Micropets included the Spring Butterfly, Baby Chick, Owl, Parrot, Penguin, and many others. Occasionally, micropets would make noise, and pets equipped with a micropet had their stats decreased at a faster pace.

GoPets provided a "Child Safety" mode which, once activated, allows the guardian to establish a Protector ID that limited the functions available for underage users. Only the specified Protector ID was able to send gifts to that account. The child's information was not viewable to the public.

=== Minigames ===
One of the GoPets stores is devoted completely to minigames. These small games can be purchased just like any other GoPets item and played on the owner's desktop. When a GoPets user purchases a minigame, it will appear in their Inventory. To play it, double-click on its Inventory icon. The most recently released games are downloaded and played independently of the GoPets' client.

Three other minigames were previously retired: Freethrow Shootout, BullsEye, and SkeeBall. Those released later have different rules, a different prize point payout and were downloaded from without the GoPets client.

There were seven in all: Poker, Diner Dash 2, Eets, CandyShot, Sudoku, Shangai and Magic Ball.

GoDance, a rhythm game, was released for free to GoPets users. There was a forum dedicated to GoDance which includes the latest link to download the updated GoDance game as well as talk to other GoDancers.

== Community ==
The GoPets service contained limited email and chat services, including a message board. Users could block other users, or add them as friends. They could also send Private Messages to them, and leave 'Testimonials' on their profile for all to see.

There was also a program called 'GoChat'. Though only Premium users could make private 'chat rooms', un-subscribed users could make public rooms. It featured font customization, with a number of fonts to choose from.

== Charity ==
GoPets users had the ability to give back to the community as well by buying certain items. A portion of the shells used to purchase the items were donated to certain charities. In addition to purchasing items, users could donate shells directly to the charities of their choice by visiting the Giving through GoPets page.

== MSN partnership ==
From summer 2007 to July 2009, GoPets was available on Windows Live Messenger via partnership with Microsoft. Players could access GoPets from MSN Messenger, playing the game and gaining access to a unique panda pet. Press coverage of the partnership referred to GoPets as "a global dog park for the 21st century" for how players could meet through their pets across global distances. The GoPet ambassador to MSN Messenger was called Lily Panda.

== Vacation Island ==
In the spring of 2007, Konami Digital Entertainment (Konami Corporation) released GoPets: Vacation Island for the Nintendo DS.
Developed by 1st Playable Productions, the game would allow the player to make and visit friends, as well as play minigames, design foods and items and dress their pets up in clothing. The DS game, like the web version, had IKU chat and minigames.

== Matchu Petchu ==
In early 2007, One Nine Studios developed a mobile game called GoPets: Matchu Petchu, where players could play minigames on mobile phones and unlock a special monkey pet.

== Premium accounts ==
A premium account gave users extra benefits, but it was not required for the website. Users with premium accounts received discounts when buying gold shells. Instead of receiving green tea fortune cookies on a daily basis, premium account users received premium fortune cookies, which gave out at least one gold shell and up to 2112. Premium users received a special item each month, for the extent of their subscription. Premium users gained access to certain shops where they could purchase items such as the "Custom Creation Tool". This was used to create items of clothing and furniture with custom textures uploaded onto the client that could then be used on the user's pets or land.

There were two types of premium memberships. The first was the monthly GoPremium, which gives the premium user the premium item of the month. The second was the yearly Premium Plus 12, which includes the premium item of the month for an entire year as well as an exclusive playset. This system was time-based and enabled at least one month of premium account. After the time limit passed, the user's account reverted to normal but the items remained.

== Awards ==
On August 28, 2006 GoPets, Ltd. was selected as a Red Herring 100 Asia Winner for 2006.

== Sale ==
In early November 2009, GoPets was sold to Zynga and immediately closed to make way for PetVille.

== See also ==
- List of social networking websites
- [[List of artificial pet games]]
