= Terminator 2: Judgment Day (arcade game) =

1991 video game

- Promotional image of a Terminator endoskeleton playing the game
- Developer: Midway (Note: Ports except the Game Boy version developed by Probe Software; Game Boy version developed by Beam Software.)
- Publisher: Midway (Note: Console ports released by Acclaim Entertainment under the Arena Entertainment brand name on Sega systems and the LJN brand name on Nintendo systems.)
- Directors: George Petro; Jack Haeger
- Producers: Neil Nicastro; Ken Fedesna
- Designers: Jack E. Haeger; Tim Coman; John Vogel
- Programmers: George Petro; Warren Davis; William F. Dabelstein, Jr. Todd R. Allen
- Composer: Chris Granner: Game Boy Marshall Parker Genesis/Mega Drive Matt Furniss Game Gear, Master System Allister Brimble Super NES Andy Brock
- Series: Terminator
- Platforms: Arcade, Game Boy, Genesis/Mega Drive, MS-DOS, Game Gear, Master System, Amiga, Super NES
- Release: October 1991: Arcade; NA: October 1991; JP: December 20, 1992 Game Boy; NA: November 1992; EU: 1992 Genesis/Mega Drive; NA: November 1992; EU: December 17, 1992 MS-DOS; 1992 Game Gear; NA: September 1993; EU: January 1994 Master System; EU: 1993 Amiga; EU: November 1993 Super NES; EU: January 1994; NA: February 1994
- Genre: Light gun shooter
- Modes: Single-player, multiplayer
- Arcade system: Midway Y Unit hardware (1991–1994); Midway X Unit hardware (1994–current)

Terminator 2: Judgment Day or T2 is a 1991 light gun shooter video game based on the film of the same name, developed and published by Midway for arcades. Developed in tandem with the movie, several actors from the film reprise their roles for the game and are featured as part of the game's photorealistic digitized graphics. The game's plot largely follows that of the film, casting up to two players as the T-800 "terminator" cyborg, sent back in time to protect John Connor from assassination by the T-1000 terminator. A success in arcades, home conversions of the game were released by Acclaim Entertainment for various platforms under the title of T2: The Arcade Game to avoid confusion with the numerous tie-in games also based on the movie.

== Plot ==
The story of the game falls in line with the movie Terminator 2: Judgment Day: to save the leader of the Human Resistance, John Connor, and his mother Sarah from the T-1000, an advanced prototype Terminator determined to kill them both.

The player takes the role of a T-800 Terminator cyborg, already captured and reprogrammed by the human resistance, and fights alongside them against Skynet in the year 2029. Eventually, the T-800 and John Connor penetrate Skynet's headquarters and destroy the system CPU. Discovering the time displacement equipment, the T-800 is sent back through time to John's childhood, with the mission to protect him from the T-1000 that Skynet has already sent back. In the past, John, Sarah, and the T-800 launch an attack on Cyberdyne Systems to prevent the development and creation of Skynet. The T-1000 catches up to the group and pursues them in a police helicopter and a liquid nitrogen truck. The T-800 can freeze and shatter the T-1000 with liquid nitrogen, but it quickly melts and reforms to continue its pursuit of John. Ultimately, the T-800 must stop the T-1000 from killing John and blast it into a vat of molten steel to destroy it.

Two endings are possible, depending on the outcome of the Cyberdyne raid. If all equipment is destroyed, the player receives a message that Judgment Day has been averted; otherwise, the company's research will continue and Judgment Day remains a possibility.

== Gameplay ==
The game allows one or two players to assume the role of a T-800 cyborg programmed to protect John and Sarah Connor and the resistance fighters against the Skynet offensive. The gameplay is set in a first-person perspective.

The game consists of seven stages, with the first four set during the human/machine war in 2029 and the last three during John's childhood in the 1990s.

1. Cross a battlefield to reach a hideout for human refugees.
2. Travel through the hideout, protecting the refugees against Terminators and other attackers.
3. Fend off Terminators and hunter-killer aircraft as John drives to the main Skynet facility in a pickup truck. The player can earn a bonus for completing this stage on the first attempt.
4. Invade the facility and destroy its main computer, after which the player's character is transported back in time.
5. Destroy as much equipment in the Cyberdyne research lab as possible while employees and SWAT officers fight back. If all equipment is destroyed during this stage, the player earns a large bonus and will receive the better of the two possible endings to the game as described above.
6. Fight off the T-1000 as it uses a police chopper and tanker truck to attack the SWAT van in which Sarah and John are escaping to a steel mill.
7. Shoot holes in the tanker to douse the T-1000 in liquid nitrogen until it freezes solid; fight off SWAT officers as John flees through the mill; then knock the T-1000 into a vat of molten steel to destroy it before it can kill John.

If John is killed in the third, sixth, or seventh stages, the player incurs a large health penalty and must replay that stage from the beginning.

The player's primary weapon is a machine gun that fires automatically as long as the trigger is pulled. Pressing a button on the side fires a secondary weapon (missiles in 2029, shotgun shells in the 1990s). Gun ammunition is unlimited; however, an on-screen power gauge gradually decreases with extended shooting, causing the rate of fire to slow down. The gauge slowly refills when the gun trigger is released. Health/weapon power-ups and ammunition supplies for the secondary weapon are available throughout the game.

At the end of each stage except the sixth, the player scores bonus points for the number and type of destroyed enemies and the amount of damage inflicted, but loses points for every human casualty (first and second stages only).

== Development ==
Carolco Pictures started looking for developers and publishers to create an arcade game adaptation of Terminator 2: Judgment Day when James Cameron signed on to write and direct the film.

The game runs on Williams/Midway Y-Unit arcade hardware.

== Ports ==
The game was converted to the 16-bit game consoles Mega Drive/Genesis and Super NES, along with the 8-bit Master System and Nintendo Game Boy with downgraded graphics. However, the Mega Drive/Genesis and Master System versions could not do scaling due to hardware limitations, and many of the images were redrawn at different sizes. The Game Boy version got around this problem by having the enemies move from the side or top of the screen. The Game Boy version also uses some music from the arcade game Narc.

The MS-DOS port of the game was very loyal to the arcade game in terms of graphics and speed. However, it was notoriously difficult to run because of the amount of conventional memory it needed (580K out of 640K) and would usually require either a boot disk or memory tweaking (or both) to load.

The game was also retitled T2: The Arcade Game to avoid conflict with the platform game. Players could control the gun cursor with the control pad. The Super NES version supports the Super Scope and the Super NES Mouse in addition to the standard control pad. Other lower graphical ports include the Amiga and the Game Gear. In North America, it was one of the few games which supported the Mega Drive/Genesis's Menacer, but on the Master System, the Light Phaser was not supported, only a joypad.

== Reception ==
Reception

Review scores
Publication	Score
AllGame	3.5/5
Amiga Format	73%
Amiga Power	57%
Computer and Video Games	GB: 88/100
Famitsu	SNES: 5/10, 4/10, 4/10, 4/10
GamePro	SNES: 16.5/20
GameZone	C
Nintendo Power	GB: 13.1/20; SNES: 12.8/20
Total!	GB: 71% SNES: 81%
CU Amiga	90%
Entertainment Weekly	D-
The One	84%

In the United States, the game topped the RePlay chart for upright arcade cabinets in December 1991, and remained at the top of the RePlay upright arcade charts into early 1992 through April 1992. It also topped the overall US Play Meter arcade chart in April 1992, briefly displacing Street Fighter II as the top-earning arcade video game in the US for a month. In Japan, Game Machine listed Terminator 2: Judgment Day on their February 1, 1992 issue as being the second most successful upright arcade unit of the month.

GamePro commented that the graphics in the SNES version "closely match the arcade version." They also praised the digitized voices and fun gameplay, and concluded that the game is "probably the only good excuse you have for getting a Super Scope", though they also commented that the SNES Mouse is the best control option for the game. Electronic Gaming Monthly likewise rated the SNES version as a good conversion, though they complained that game was too difficult. They gave it a 6.8 out of 10.

Terminator 2: Judgment Day was ranked as the 18th best arcade game of the 1990s by Complex. Brad Cook of AllGame gave the arcade version three and a half stars out of five, and noted the game's difficulty. Brett Alan Weiss of AllGame gave the SNES version three and a half stars and wrote, "The biggest drawback of T2: The Arcade Game is the controls. If you don't have a Super Scope (or at the very least a mouse), the game suffers quite a bit because you can't move the sight as fast or as precisely as you would like." Weiss called it "a faithfully recreated game," and wrote, "Though not quite as satisfying as the arcade version, it's about as good as you could expect from the 16-bit SNES."

Steve Bradley of Amiga Format gave the Amiga version a 73 percent rating and called it "a faithful conversion" of the arcade version, as well as, "A fast, furious and frantic, if rather limited, shoot-em-up with a barrowload of violence chucked in for good measure." CU Amiga gave the Amiga version a 90 percent rating and called it, "A pixel perfect recreation of the fantastic arcade experience." CU Amiga called its graphics "miles better than the Mega Drive conversion," and noted that it was easier than the arcade version because of its different speed levels.

Stuart Campbell of Amiga Power gave the Amiga version a 57 percent rating and felt that it was an improvement from an earlier Terminator 2 video game by Ocean Software. However, Campbell wrote, "The graphics are small and shoddy, the sound is largely horrible, the gameplay is repetitive and swiftly tedious, and you will more than likely finish it inside three or four goes. If you can bear the frustration of having that many goes in the first place, that is. Tangibly inferior to the Mega Drive version, and there is very little excuse for that. The repetitive gameplay is hardly the conversion's fault, but it is pretty sloppy in most other departments, and the reduced difficulty (from the Mega Drive game at least) is a major mistake." Flux ranked the arcade version 74th on their Top 100 Video Games in 1995. They lauded the arcade version writing: "One of the best movie adaptations ever."

== Legacy ==
In 2021, Arcade1Up announced a 3/4 scale replica on the T2 arcade cabinet. The cabinet runs the original arcade version of the game and also includes a behind-the-scenes documentary of how the game was made. Noticeable differences include the light guns being demountable, rather than Positional guns. They are also red & blue in color, instead of the original black. The cabinet uses Sinden technology, in which a small camera is built into the guns that track a white border surrounding the screen. This is because all Arcade1Up machines use a modern LCD. Other minor differences include the Midway logo not being present on the top sides of the cabinet & the ability to post high scores via a WiFi leaderboard.
