= Starflight 2: Trade Routes of the Cloud Nebula =

1989 video game

Starflight 2
- Developers: Binary Systems (MS-DOS); MicroMagic (Amiga, Mac)
- Publisher: Electronic Arts
- Producer: Roland Kippenhan III
- Designer: Greg Johnson
- Programmer: Bob Gonsalves
- Artists: Matt Crane; Greg Johnson; Erol Otus
- Platforms: MS-DOS, Amiga, Mac
- Release: 1989: MS-DOS; 1991: Amiga, Mac
- Genres: Strategy, role-playing
- Mode: Single-player

Starflight 2: Trade Routes of the Cloud Nebula is a video game developed by Binary Systems and published by Electronic Arts as the sequel to the successful Starflight. It was originally released in 1989 for IBM PC compatibles. Amiga and Mac versions were released in 1991.

The game is a combination of space exploration, role-playing, and strategy in a futuristic setting. The player commands a spaceship capable of traveling to the game world's 150 solar systems, communicating with or attacking other spaceships, and landing on planetary surfaces which may be explored with a crewed rover for plot clues, minerals and alien lifeforms. Game mechanics and the overall look and feel closely resemble the earlier Starflight game, but many new features are introduced including an interstellar trade-based economy, new sentient alien races, and new spacecraft accessories and artifacts. The player is tasked with discovering the ultimate source of the advanced spacecraft technology and unlimited fuel supply which provide a military advantage to the Spemin, a hostile alien race threatening to annihilate or enslave humanity. A major part of the game consists of earning enough money to pay for spaceship upgrades and crew training by engaging in interstellar trade and barter with various alien cultures at their planetary trading posts.

Reviews were somewhat mixed. Computer Gaming World designated it the "role-playing game of the year" in 1990 and praised its playability and vast, immersive, scope. Some reviewers criticized the graphics and sound quality, the handling of saved games, or the repetitive nature of the player encounters.

== Gameplay ==
Landing to collect minerals is a typical activity in the game but not all planets are equally hospitable.

The player begins the game in a space station called Starport Outpost 1 with a meager allotment of funds for outfitting a spaceship and training crew members in the skills needed to operate it. Crew members are chosen from one of five races, each of which possesses certain strengths and weaknesses, and are assigned to the positions of captain, science officer, navigator, engineer, communications officer, and doctor. Aside from the captain, specialized training is available for each position at a cost that increases in proportion to the amount of training received. Training raises the proficiency at which crew members perform their duties and reduces the number of errors they make.

Spacecraft engines, lasers, missiles, shields and armor are available for purchase at levels ranging from one through five, each successive level representing an increase in the power and the cost of the item. Also available for purchase are cargo pods that expand the spaceship's storage capacity, jump pods (single-use devices capable of almost instantaneously transporting the spaceship to any point within the region), and blasto pods (single-use torpedoes with considerable destructive power). Additional training and spaceship accessories may be purchased at any time throughout the game.

Before the player may leave Starport and explore the surrounding universe, the spaceship's "navigation system must be calibrated", a procedure serving as the game's copy protection scheme in which stars must be counted within a specified part of the paper star map included in the game's packaging (a "master code", 34789, will always be considered correct and can be used to bypass the scheme).

The player controls the ship from a navigation screen displaying multiple panels:

1. Main View Screen: provides an overhead view of the spaceship in relation to its immediate surroundings.
2. Auxiliary View Screen: displays information about the spaceship's status including a fuel gauge and the state of the weapons and defensive systems.
3. Control Panel: provides a menu driven user interface from which the player selects commands to issue to crew members.
4. Text Window: displays text messages.

Two modes of space travel exist: interstellar and interplanetary. Interstellar travel involves the player maneuvering the spaceship from one star to another, sometimes with the aid of continuum fluxes or jump pods, both of which provide a quick shortcut between two distant points in space. When the player maneuvers the spaceship towards a star, the interplanetary travel mode begins. A schematic showing the relative positions of the planets in that solar system appears in the auxiliary view screen, all of which may be orbited by the player's spaceship and scanned to reveal basic information including the planet's gravitational strength. Large planets with strong gravity, such as gas giants, will destroy the ship if a landing is attempted, but the ship may successfully land on many worlds. When the player is ready to land, the auxiliary view screen displays a planetary topographic map with a cursor allowing a specific location to be selected. Following a successful landing, the crew boards a terrain vehicle which the player is able to move about the planet to explore ruins for plot clues, harvest minerals and alien lifeforms, and travel to trading posts at which the player may buy or sell items through bartering. The main view screen shows the terrain vehicle in relation to its immediate surroundings. Potential hazards on planetary excursions include running out of fuel, dangerous weather conditions, and hostile alien lifeforms. The locations of uninhabited earth-like planets may be logged for recommendation to Interstel as potential colony worlds in return for a substantial monetary reward.

The player occasionally encounters other spacecraft during interstellar and interplanetary travel. When an encounter begins, the main view screen shows a tactical overhead map depicting the player's spaceship in relation to the nearby alien vessels. The player may either attack, attempt to communicate, try to flee the encounter by running away, or scan the alien vessels to determine their capabilities. Conversing with friendly alien species is an important means by which the player obtains clues to advance the game's plot. Some encounters result in the outbreak of hostilities in which the player must either attempt to destroy the attacking vessels or flee. The spaceship computer automatically takes care of targeting and firing lasers and missiles, except for blasto pods which are manually triggered, while the player maneuvers the spaceship around the scene of battle in real-time. Both the spaceship's shields and armor protect it from damage by hostile fire, but only shields are able to regenerate. The encounter ends when the player has moved sufficiently far from the other vessels and normal space travel resumes.

== Story ==
=== Setting ===
The game world includes approximately 150 solar systems, each of which contains between zero and eight planets ranging from inhospitable gas giants to habitable Earth-like worlds. Thirty sentient species are native to this region of space and inhabit various planets throughout the sector. Six of these possess fleets of spaceships which may be encountered in some solar systems and in interstellar space. The spacefaring alien races include the perpetually depressed Dweenle, the deeply religious two warring branches of the Tandelou, and the mercantile oriented Humna Humna. The central part of the game world is dominated by the massive Cloud Nebula mentioned in the game's title; it is infested with the powerful spaceships of the hostile Umanu and Uhlek.

=== Plot ===
Events in Starflight 2 occur some years after those in Starflight and in a different part of the universe. Following the destruction of the Crystal Planet at the conclusion of the earlier game, the spacefaring corporation Interstel bans the use of the spaceship fuel Endurium. The Spemin, one of the alien races encountered in the original game, subsequently acquires powerful new spaceship technology and a seemingly unlimited supply of a new fuel substance called Shyneum from a mysterious source. Boasting of the tactical advantage their spaceships now possess over those fielded by Interstel, the Spemin demand that humanity become their slaves or face destruction. Interstel manages to trick a Spemin into revealing the location of a continuum flux leading to the general region of space from which they obtained these technologies. Although Interstel successfully establishes itself in this region by constructing a space station called Starport Outpost 1, it needs the player's help to "find the source of the fuel substance known as Shyneum and acquire the technology the Spemin possess". The game begins with the player in command of a poorly equipped spaceship docked at Starport.

A major subplot involves earning enough money to provide all crew members with the maximum level of training and equip the player's spaceship with the best available weapons, shields, armor and engines. Much of the game consists of trading goods from one alien culture to another, exploring planets for mineral resources and alien lifeforms that can later be sold, and seeking uninhabited earth-like planets to recommend to Interstel for possible colonization. Discovering artifacts that enhance the spaceship's capabilities in various ways is also a significant part of the game.

Unraveling the main plot is largely a matter of discovering ways to befriend the various spacefaring alien races to get them to reveal clues through conversation. Interaction with these alien races involves numerous minor subplots which occupy the player throughout much of the game. Eventually the player travels back in time to retrieve a data cube constructed by an ancient, technologically advanced, alien race called the Leghk which contains the secrets of the Spemin's new technology. The data contained on the cube enable engineers at Interstel to outfit the player's spaceship with the sophisticated armaments needed to survive a journey into the heart of the Cloud Nebula to confront the hostile Umanu and Uhlek. Winning the ensuing battle opens access to the Shyneum Planet, the source of the new fuel substance.

== Development ==
T.C. Lee programmed fractal graphics routines which provide unique topography for each planet in the game. Designer Greg Johnson co-founded Johnson Voorsanger Productions while work on the game was still in progress, but remained with Electronic Arts long enough to finish the game.

Originally published for IBM PC compatibles, ports to the Amiga and Mac by MicroMagic were released in 1991.

== Reception ==
Reception

Review scores
Publication	Score
Computer Gaming World	4/5
Dragon	3/5

Award
Publication	Award
Computer Gaming World	1990 RPG of the Year

Gameplay reviews were mixed. Computer Gaming World's editors commended the game's designers for creating "a universe with so many cultures, personalities, options and plot twists that it is easy for players to suspend their disbelief". A 1994 survey in the survey of strategic space games set in the year 2000 and later gave the game four stars out of five, stating that it was "still a good buy if you can find it used or in a bargain bin". Amiga Action wrote that "the blend of RPG style gameplay and space trading is unparalleled and should appeal to most". Reviewer Matt Regan wrote in CU Amiga that "the game is let down by its fundamental lack of excitement; there's no sense of urgency or even a feeling of frontier exploration. The party just plods on, trading, communicating, and gathering information and this gets tiresome as soon as the novelty of the system wears off". Dragon reviewers Hartley, Patricia, and Kirk Lesser gave the game 3 out of 5 stars.

The game's graphics and sound also received a mixed reception. Chris Lombardi wrote in Computer Gaming World that "the game's graphics are very strong, and in many ways improved over the original game". Info praised the "exceptionally good" music and sound in the game's Amiga version. Amiga Action wrote that the "graphics and sound remain fairly prehistoric" and CU Amiga's reviewer stated that the "run-of-the-mill visual effects and music" must be "accessed from the disk every time certain actions are performed" (resulting in sluggish performance).

Handling of copy-protection and saved games received some criticism. Info's reviewer criticized "a setup process that takes far too long" and a "starchart-lookup copy protection scheme that is poorly done". Only one save game position is provided and that becomes unusable if the game ends with the spaceship's entire crew being killed. Players have to maintain backups of their game files on a separate disk or in another file directory to be able to continue in the game should such a scenario unfold. Computer Gaming World wrote that this design decision was deliberately made "to create more realistic play and avoid what some call 'unethical gaming' (saving after every advancement and rebooting after every error). Despite the supporting ideology, it is actually a pain". In November 1996, the magazine ranked Starflight 2 in sixth place in a list of the "least rewarding endings of all time" for this reason.

Computer Gaming World awarded Starflight 2 their role-playing game of the year award in September 1990. The magazine's editors wrote that it "offers ample reward for exploration, utilizing curiosity, managing resources and carefully handling trade and negotiation. It expands the notion of role-playing beyond the traditional limits of computer games".

== Legacy ==
An unofficial sequel, Protostar, was published in 1993.

In November 2011, Electronic Arts re-released a compilation of both Starflight games through GOG.com.

Starflight 3 went through an unsuccessful crowdfunding campaign in 2018 on Fig.

== See also ==
- Star Control II
