= Alien Legacy =

1994 video game

- Developer: Ybarra Productions
- Publisher: Sierra On-Line
- Director: Andy Riedel
- Producer: Joe Ybarra
- Designers: Scot Amos; Michael E. Moore; Rich Waters
- Programmers: Roy Eltham; Jeffrey McArthur; Mike McAulay; Andy Riedel
- Artist: Mark Dickenson
- Composers: Biard MacGuineas; Steve A. Baker
- Platform: MS-DOS
- Release: 1994
- Genre: Real-time strategy
- Mode: Single-player

Alien Legacy is a sci-fi strategy game developed by Ybarra Productions and published by Sierra On-Line in 1994 for MS-DOS.

== Gameplay ==
The game includes elements of city construction, research, resource management, industrial production and combat. Players must colonize a star system light-years from Earth by building planetary cities and Space Stations. Several advisors guide the player through the plot and a PDA reminds the player of important tasks as objectives, revealed as the scenario progresses. The game progresses in real-time but the game speed can be adjusted.

Some tasks must be done before a set time limit or else the game will end prematurely. For example, at the beginning of the game, if the player fails to form a self-sufficient colony on Gaea, (a colony with at least one habitat, power plant and factory) the science advisor (also the mission's executive officer) will kill the player for incompetence and take over the command.

== Plot ==
The game takes place after the arrival of the UNS Calypso in the Beta Caeli star system. You take the role as captain of the Calypso. The Calypso has been sent from Earth to colonize the system. The UNS Tantalus was sent to the same star system after you, but because it makes use of a better engine, arrives in Beta Caeli before you do. The Calypso, Tantalus, and similar ships were sent to colonize other star systems due to the threat of humanity's extinction on Earth as a result of an interstellar war. The story involves the Calypso's attempts to find out what happened to the Tantalus and its colonies which have gone missing, as well as other mysteries involving relics of previous non-human inhabitants of the system.

=== Planetary systems ===
The Beta Caeli system is similar to the actual Solar System, with a barren, rocky inner planet, terrestrial planets in the habitable zone of the inner system, followed by gas giants in the outer system that first increase and then decrease in size, and a tiny rock outermost.

- Beta Caeli (F0-type Star; Blue-White in color)
- Alpha Asteroid Belt; analogous to the nonexistent Vulcanoids
- Hermes (Rocky Planet); analogous to Mercury
- Rhea (Earth-like Planet) Similar to Venus in position, but has a large Moon and is slightly larger than Earth. The presence of the large natural satellite and a quick rotation rate supposedly prevented the runaway greenhouse effect, making it Earth-like.
- Prometheus (Natural Satellite of Rhea), analogous to Earth's Moon
- Gaea (Earth-like Planet); the Calypso starts the game orbiting Gaea. It has no moon.
- Ares (Desert Planet); analogous to Mars but poor in iron
- Beta Asteroid Belt; analogous to the Solar System's main asteroid belt
- Zeus (Gas Giant); analogous to Jupiter
- Hera (Natural Satellite of Zeus); analogous to Io but larger and less volcanically active
- Hebe (Natural Satellite of Zeus); analogous to Ganymede
- Cronus (Gas Giant); analogous to Saturn but has no rings or moons.
- Poseidon (Gas Giant); analogous to Uranus and Neptune
- Thetis (Natural Satellite of Poseidon); analogous to Triton but larger
- Hades (Minor Planet); analogous to Pluto

The naming of the Caelian planets closely matches that of naming planets in the Solar System. But while the Solar System uses the names of Roman deities (except for Uranus), Caeli has Greek ones; Gaea is the Greek goddess of the Earth, and Rhea is her daughter. In addition, as Beta Caeli is brighter and hotter than the Sun, the Caelian planets are more distant from their star than their Solar System analogs. In reality, Beta Caeli may be too bright and young to host life, a fact noted in the game itself where they noted that the system is 2.5 billion years old but an F0 star lasts for about 5 billion years, yet both Earth-like planets have advanced life forms.

=== Races ===
- The H'riak, a highly xenophobic race who have apparently seeded many planets in the Galaxy with their life, including Beta Caeli and Alpha Centauri, but apparently not Earth. They have an automated sporeship hidden within Gamma 1 in the outer asteroid field. The sporeship seems to send signals to the biota of terrestrial planets, and program it to attack any non-H'riak life forms nearby. Gamma1 was originally heavily armed, until the Tantalus colonists managed to destroy most of its weaponry at the cost of all of their ships.
- The Empiants, who resemble purple squids in appearance, inhabit the gas giant Cronus. In the past, the Empiants waged war against the H'Riak. After the player establishes a station orbiting Cronus, the Empiants attack. The Empiants communicate telepathically and are adversely affected by Human brainwaves after the Calypso colonists establish a station orbiting Cronus. This leads the Empiants to attack the Humans, but once a solution is found to block Human brain waves, they are not unreasonable, only asking that gas for energy not be siphoned from Cronus. (Zeus and Poseidon are still acceptable sources of energy.)

== Reception ==
Game journalist Niko Nirvi awarded Alien Legacy a score of 82% in Pelit magazine. The game's plot carried the game for Nirvi, keeping him interested throughout and compensating for weak gameplay. He found the plot to be quite linear, and while events may happen differently on replay, felt no need to return to the game after completing it. Conversely, he found the strategy side lacking: the advisors "hold the player's hand". He summed up the game as a "snack" for beginners. Nirvi deemed the game's graphics pleasant, its interface generally well-working, and its sounds nondescript.

James V. Trunzo reviewed Alien Legacy in White Wolf Inphobia #52 (Feb., 1995), rating it a 5 out of 5 and stated that "Alien Legacy, in fact, is Spaceflight taken to the next level. New elements, such as natural disasters and colony construction on a building-by-building basis, have been added to older space adventure elements, improving upon an already solid concept. And state-of-the-art graphic detail enhances the entire experience."
