= Menacer =

Video game accessory

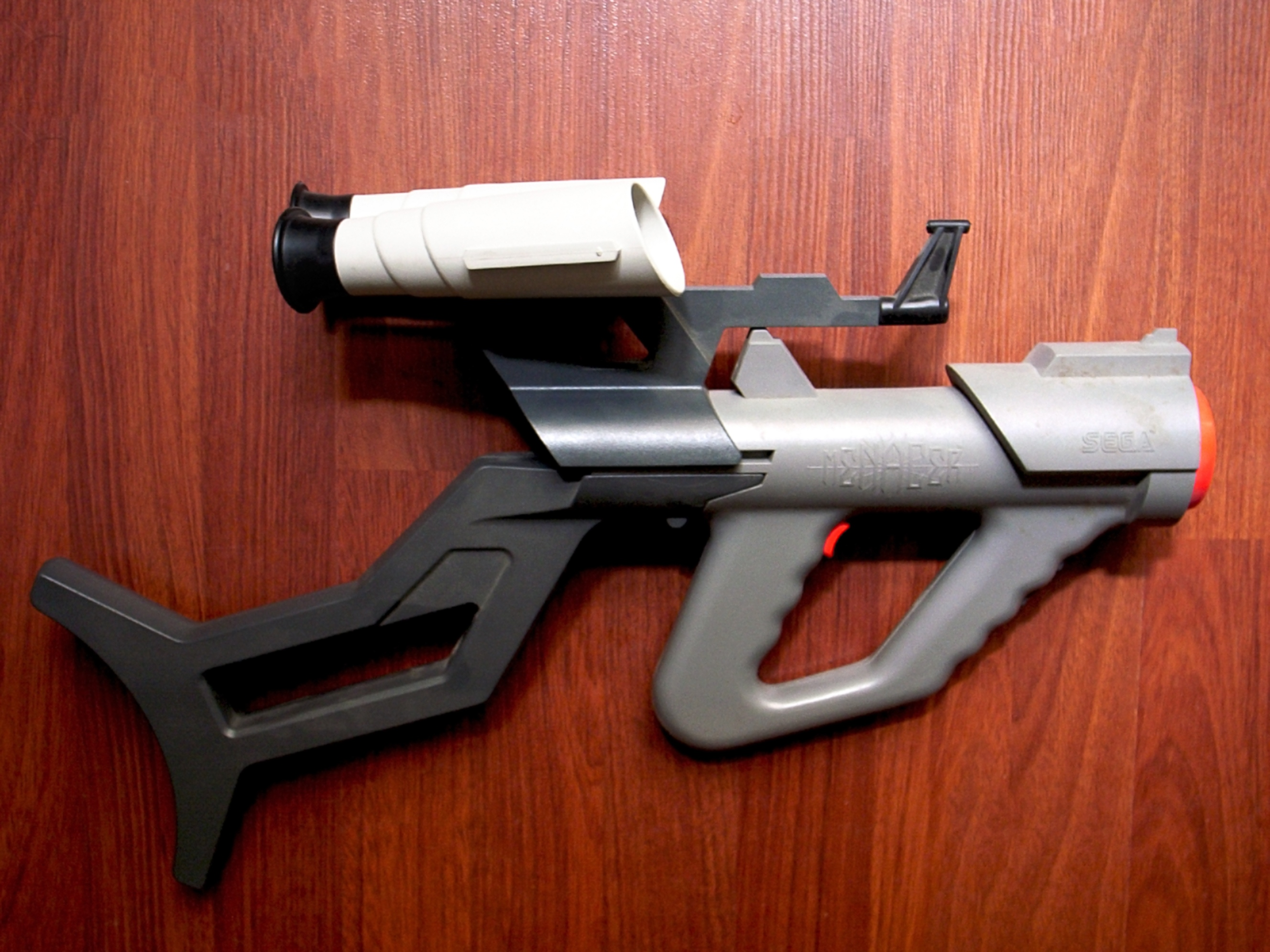
- Developer: Mac Senour
- Manufacturer: Sega
- Type: Light gun
- Released: NA: October 1992; EU: November 19, 1992
- Introductory price: US$59.99 (equivalent to $138 in 2025)
- Power: Six AAA batteries
- Platform: Sega Genesis

The Menacer is a light gun peripheral released by Sega in 1992 for its Sega Genesis and Sega CD video game consoles. It was created in response to Nintendo's Super Scope and as Sega's successor to the Master System Light Phaser. The gun is built from three detachable parts (pistol, shoulder stock, sights), and communicates with the television via an infrared sensor. The Menacer was announced at the May 1992 Consumer Electronics Show in Chicago and was released later that year. The gun was bundled with a pack-in six-game cartridge of mostly shooting gallery games. Sega also released a Menacer bundle with T2: The Arcade Game.

Sega producer Mac Senour was responsible for the Menacer project and designed the six-game pack. He originally proposed non-shooting minigames based on existing Sega licenses like Joe Montana, David Robinson, and ToeJam & Earl, but most of the prototypes were abandoned due to high cost in favor of more shooting-type games. Sega did not plan another first-party release for the Menacer apart from the included multicart. Compatible games were published through 1995.

The Menacer is remembered as a critical and commercial flop. Critics found the six-game pack subpar and repetitive, and criticized the peripheral's lack of games. The ToeJam & Earl spinoff game was held in the highest regard, and reviewers recommended the Menacer-compatible Terminator 2 game. A direct-to-TV light gun that includes the six-game Menacer pack was released in 2005.

== Description ==
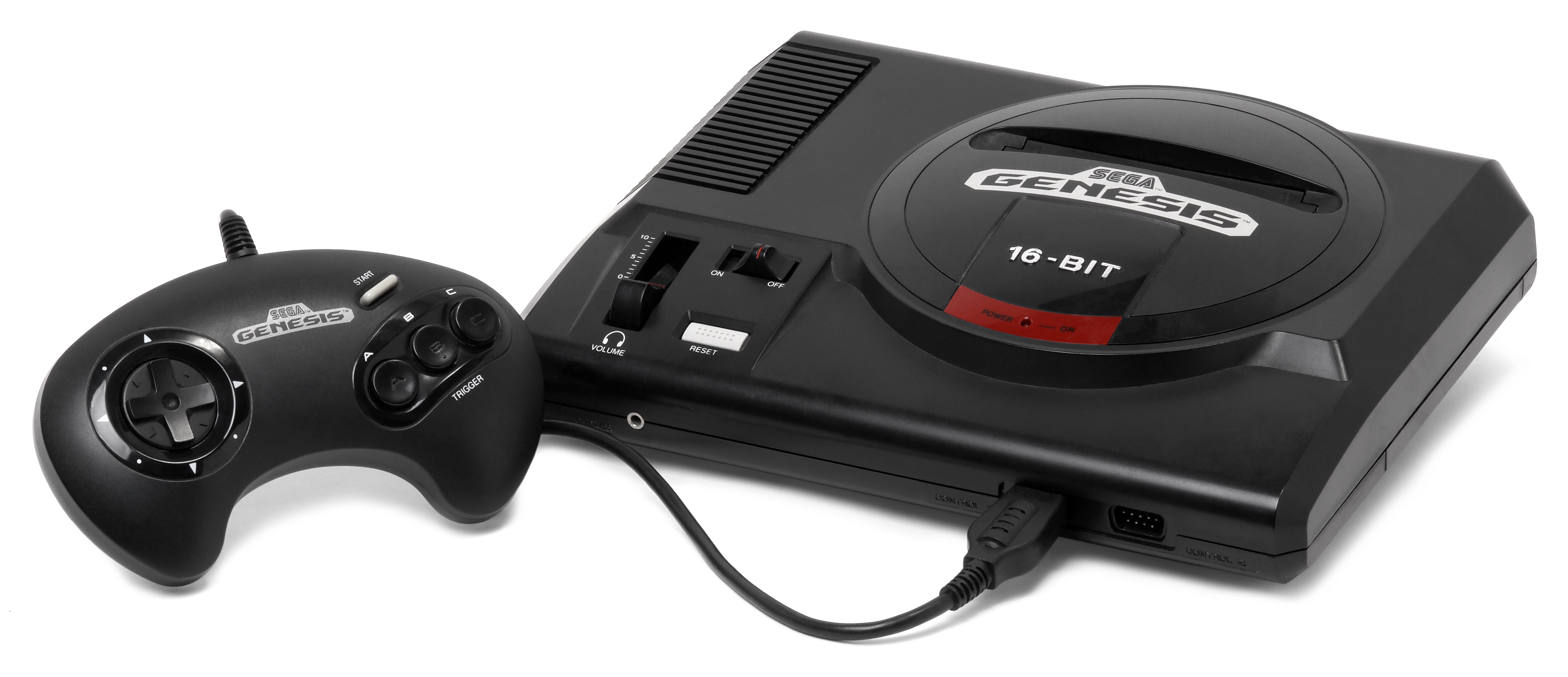
Sega Genesis

The gray, white, and red Menacer is a light gun peripheral for the Sega Genesis. The Menacer is built of three separable parts: a pistol, twin sights, and shoulder stock. (In the peripheral's branding, these parts were called the Master Module, Binocular Module, and Stabilizer Module, respectively.) The pistol has a double grip and fires the infrared beam with a trigger on the back grip. There are three buttons on the pistol's front grip: one pauses the game and the other two provide game-specific functions. Unlike the Super Scope, the Menacer has two infrared transmitters. The optional skeletal shoulder stock and binocular twin sights were designed to improve the aim. Digital Spy reported that the twin sights never worked as intended, and Sega Force wrote that the gun must be recalibrated when adding or removing the sights. Calibration is performed by aiming at a bullseye target to adjust the gun's sensitivity. The gun was designed to be reassembled to suit the player.

The light gun's shots are controlled by its aim towards the television. It operates on batteries and works in conjunction with a sensor plugged into the second controller port and placed atop the television display. The sensor counts CRT television scan lines to detect the player's shots. Sega Force noticed that the controller acts erratically when used under fluorescent lighting. Sega recommended eight feet (2.4 m) of distance from the receiver, though the peripheral works between four and twelve feet (1–4 m) from the television. Sega Force reported that the controller lasts about 18 hours on new batteries, though Will Smith of The Hawk Eye estimated fewer ("a matter of hours"). The Toronto Star wrote that the Menacer lasts 20 hours as opposed to the Super Scope's 50 to 140 hours. The Menacer has no power switch: it automatically activates when aimed at the television and turns off after 30 seconds without input. The Super Scope fully drains its batteries when left on. Menacer's Accu-Sight option puts crosshairs on the screen to eliminate the need to aim manually through the sights. The gun does not have a "turbo" mode for continuous fire, unlike the Super Scope.

== History ==
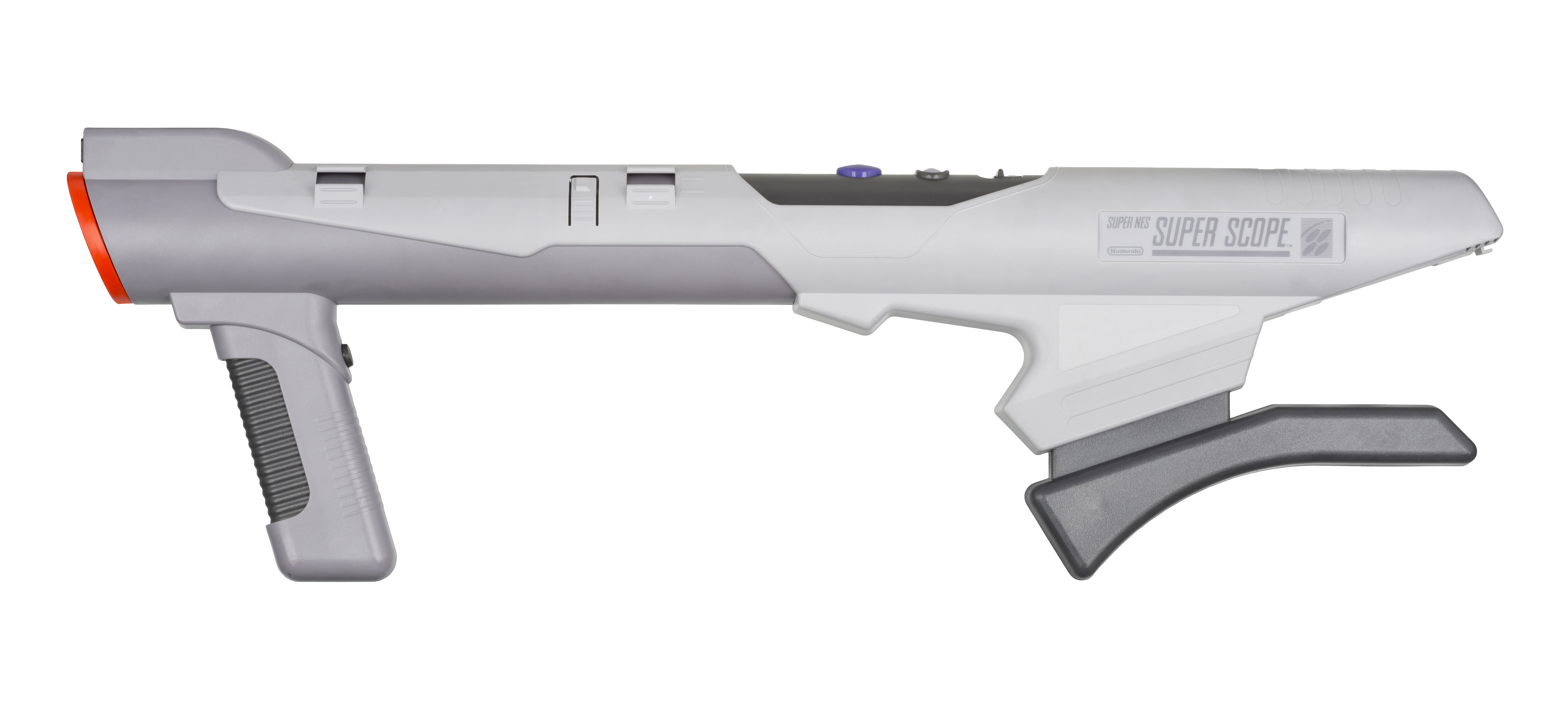
Nintendo Super Scope, the peripheral that prompted the Menacer.

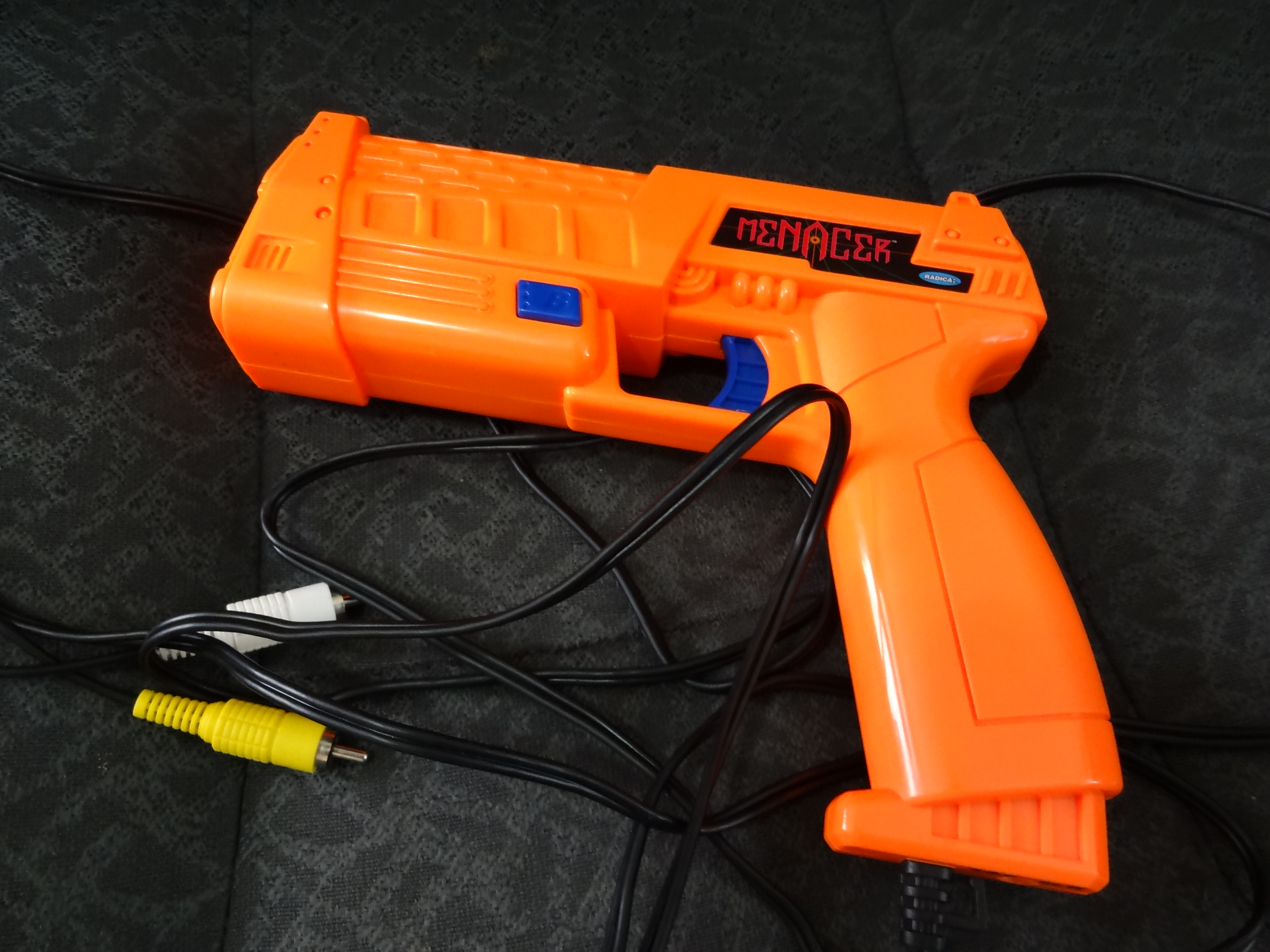
Radica's 2005 direct-to-TV dedicated console plays the Menacer's six-game cartridge without a Sega Genesis.

The Menacer was produced in response to the Nintendo Super Scope released several months earlier, though Sega intended to support the peripheral as more than a clone. These two peripherals brought arcade light gun game ports to home consoles. The Menacer is the successor to the Master System's Light Phaser.

Mac Senour, a producer at Sega, was responsible for the peripheral and its six-game cartridge as the company's "hardware boy". He designed the six minigames based on Sega's previous intellectual property and licenses—such as ToeJam & Earl—under the instruction to avoid shooting games. His prototypes included games based on Joe Montana (Joe Montana Wide Receiver Training Camp) and David Robinson, but when presented, the company asked for more shooting games and scrapped all license-based games (besides ToeJam & Earl, whose license was free) due to their added cost. His "reverse Blockout game" prototype was the only other title carried to the final cartridge. Senour recalled that upon his cubicle presentation to Sega Japan's president, the executive did not say anything besides "very good" before leaving. Sega did not plan any other first-party releases for the Menacer—Senour recollected that "they laughed when I proposed more."

Sega announced the Menacer alongside the Sega CD at the May 1992 Consumer Electronics Show in Chicago and the peripheral was released towards the end of that year. By December 1992, the Menacer began shipping with T2: The Arcade Game as a bundle. Playthings reported that Chicago toy retailers promoted Sega electronics including the Menacer over Nintendo's during their 1992 Thanksgiving promotions. Sega's sales exceeded Nintendo's during the 1992 Christmas season, and gained cultural cachet for the Menacer among other peripherals. Electronic Gaming Monthly reported in March 1993 that the Menacer would not have a new game for six months. Compatible games were published through 1995.

Mac Senour left Sega in 1993 for Atari Games, where he received an increase in pay and status. He later worked at Konami and Electronic Arts. In his first days at Atari, Senour was sent to Paris, where he remembered an excess of unsold Menacers in a Virgin Megastores display. His translators told the clerk that Senour was responsible for the Menacer, and when Senour offered to autograph their stock, the clerk replied in slow English that Senour could autograph the items he purchased.

In 2005, Radica created a Menacer-based direct-to-TV dedicated console with the original six-game cartridge built into a light gun controller as part of their Play TV Legends line of Sega Genesis dedicated consoles. Retro Gamer wrote that Radica's gun is based on the Sega Saturn light gun's design and not the Menacer's.

== Games ==
Screenshots from the Menacer 6-game cartridge (clockwise from top left): Pest Control, Space Station Defender, Whack Ball, Rockman's Zone, Front Line, Ready, Aim, Tomatoes!

Games include the pack-in single-player Menacer 6-game cartridge, (Note: The 6-game cartridge was developed by Western Technologies, with the exception of the ToeJam & Earl minigame which was developed by Johnson Voorsanger Productions.) which consists of mostly shooting gallery games:

- Ready, Aim, Tomatoes! is a spin-off of the original ToeJam & Earl where the player (as ToeJam) fires tomatoes at ToeJam & Earl series enemies for points as the screen scrolls. The scroll speed increases with game duration. The enemies—dentists, devils, and cupids—return fire throughout the ten levels. The game also features power-ups and lock-on targeting, to aid in player accuracy.
- In Rockman's Zone, the screen scrolls through streets of houses as the player shoots criminals and refrains from shooting innocent bystanders, for which the player loses a life. In later levels, the criminals return fire faster.
- Space Station Defender is similar to Tomatoes! with added memory aspects. In each level, players shoot enemy-filled pods as up to eight drop in a memorizable sequence. There are 999 levels, a Power Zone to charge shots, and power-ups including extra shields.
- Whack Ball is comparable to Breakout: the player controls a large ball with the Menacer to push a smaller on-screen ball into color-changing bricks that line the wall. Once all of the bricks change color, the player moves to the next level. Some bricks are power-ups that change the larger ball's size or add extra small balls into play. Players who hit flashing bricks are punished. Inadvertently guiding the ball through a hole in the wall ends the game.
- In Front Line, the player defends against tanks and airplanes with a machine gun and missiles with unlimited ammo.
- In Pest Control, the player's vision is limited to a small area of the screen around the Accu-Sight crosshairs while looking for cockroaches that attempt to eat an on-screen pizza. Two different power-ups briefly illuminate the screen and clear all bugs onscreen. Later levels feature larger insects that contain bombs and small, fast bugs.

Digital Spy mentioned Body Count, T2: The Arcade Game, and Mad Dog McCree as Menacer's other notable games. Terminator 2 was the first external game to work with the Menacer, the only one confirmed as of December 1992. Terminator's programmers, Probe Software, later began work on another Menacer-compatible game. Terminator 2 has a two-player mode that uses one Menacer light gun and one controller. Sega Force reported that Menacer gameplay registered faster than the Genesis controller. Mad Dog McCree, a live action Wild West shoot 'em up for the Sega CD, used either a controller or a choice of several light guns: the Menacer, the Konami Justifier, or the game developer's own compatible light gun. In Body Count, the player defends Earth from an alien invasion. The Irish Times wrote that the game is "ideally suited for the ... Menacer" and is "to be avoided" otherwise. The Menacer is also compatible with Corpse Killer and American Laser Games' other titles, such as Who Shot Johnny Rock? The light gun does not work with Konami's Lethal Enforcers games or Snatcher, which use the Konami Justifier.

List of Menacer-compatible games by release date
| Title | Release date (console) |
|---|---|
| Menacer 6-Game Cartridge | NA: October 1992; EU: November 19, 1992 |
| T2: The Arcade Game | NA: November 1992; EU: December 17, 1992 |
| Mad Dog McCree | April 22, 1993 (Sega CD) |
| Body Count | EU: July 15, 1994; NA: 1995 (Sega Channel) |
| Who Shot Johnny Rock? | September 21, 1994 (Sega CD) |
| Mad Dog II: The Lost Gold | September 27, 1994 (Sega CD) |
| Corpse Killer | November 7, 1994 (Sega CD, Sega 32X) |
| Crime Patrol | December 16, 1994 (Sega CD) |

== Reception ==
Matthew Reynolds of Digital Spy wrote that the Menacer was a poorly executed "flop" that is much less likely to be remembered than its Super Scope competitor, even though the latter did not fare much better. Reynolds added that the Menacer was hurt by the poor quality of the pack-in six-game cartridge and a lack of titles in support of the peripheral. Will Smith of The Hawk Eye concurred, calling the peripheral "a commercial and critical flop". The Menacer's original reviewers pinned the device's success on the strength of its developer support, and multiple reviewers cited the Menacer's lack of good games as the cause for its decline.

Writing for the Chicago Tribune on the 1992 Consumer Electronics Show, Dennis Lynch saw the Super Scope and Menacer as a continuation of a Nintendo–Sega arms race and wrote that the peripheral's "Uzi attachment" was "just what every kid needs". The Atlanta Journal-Constitution's Andy Pargh said the Menacer was "definitely a winner" in comparison to the Super Scope. Toronto Star's William Burrill wrote that the "Great Zapper War" would be decided by the strength of the light guns' supporting games. Multiple reviewers ultimately recommended that players wait for more games to be released before purchasing the Menacer. William Burrill of the Toronto Star said not to bother unless the player "absolutely love[s] target shooter games". Mean Machines Sega called the Menacer "an expensive novelty" until it had more games. The Herald Sun wrote in August 1993 that the Menacer looked to be "an expensive, limited-use fad".

GamePro considered the gun "well-designed" and "fairly good-looking", though they wrote that the gun's options buttons were inconvenient and that the Menacer's lengthy recalibrations before play sessions without Accu-Sight were tedious. Mean Machines Sega wrote that the gun's shades of gray clashed with the glossy black console. Several reviewers called the binocular scope addition unhelpful. Paul Mellerick of Mega found the manual sights an eyestrain and the gun "deadly accurate" as long as players used the Accu-Sight mode. Still, as of January 1993, Mega felt that the Menacer's future success was doubtless. Jaz of Mean Machines Sega had low expectations for the Menacer, which he compared to the shortcomings of previous light guns: high price, short-lived novelty, and dearth of games. Gus of Mean Machines Sega wrote that "Sega hasn't learned the lessons" from the Super Scope's "fairly naff" release in the magazine's January 1993 Menacer review, calling the light gun a "samey-looking, samey-playing piece of hardware, with some redundant add-ons" with mediocre launch titles. He added that the Menacer was less tiring to use than the Super Scope, praised the Menacer's infrared, and criticized the gun's lack of available software.

Multiple reviewers found the pack-in six-game cartridge games subpar and repetitive. Mean Machines Sega's Gus wrote that the games were all too simple and easy. Of the pack, reviewers held Ready, Aim, Tomatoes! in the highest regard. Ray Barnholt of 1UP.com wrote that the Menacer's games were "duller" than its competitor Super Scope's already dull games, but Tomatoes! gave Sega's cartridge "some pittance of value". Mega rated the ToeJam & Earl spin-off at 62%, calling it "fun and strange" though "rather repetitive". Sega Force thought the game's graphics were the pack's best, and its audio to be of high quality, though the magazine also considered the game repetitive. GamePro thought the game's colors were oversaturated.

As for the other six-pack titles, Mega called Rockman's Zone "not a very inspiring game" for its slow pacing and "bland" graphics. Reviewers compared the game to Hogan's Alley and Empire City: 1931. Mega called Space Station Defender's concept "incredibly daft". GamePro criticized Space Station Defender's "washed-out and ugly" graphics and "obnoxious" audio. The magazine thought poorly of most of the cartridge's audio. Mega found Whack Ball easy and did not expect players to maintain interest in it for longer than an hour. Sega Visions compared Whack Ball to Arkanoid. Mega wrote that Front Line was programmed poorly with "the appearance of having never met up with a gamestester", calling it "truly awful". Electronic Gaming Monthly and GamePro compared the game to Operation Wolf. Sega Force rated Front Line lowest within the six-pack, with a score of 22%. The magazine wrote that the bug game, Pest Control, would make players bored after ten minutes, and Mega said the game was not worth loading even once, giving it their lowest rating of the bunch: 12%. Sega Force wrote in February that the games were only fun for an hour and that the peripheral's success would depend on its future games, adding, "Without that [developer] support, it will die as surely as all other attempts at light guns have done." The magazine ultimately recommended against purchase until more games were released.

Sega Force's Paul Wooding considered Terminator 2 a "must" for Menacer owners, adding that it far surpassed the quality of the six-pack games. The magazine added that the gun registered shots faster than the controller, was more accurate, and worked well from a distance. Neil West of Mega wrote the Menacer works well with Terminator 2 in his review of the game. The Hawk Eye's Will Smith wrote in 2010 that the six-game pack and Terminator 2 were the only Menacer games readily accessible. Ken Horowitz of Sega-16 wrote that none of the Menacer-compatible titles were exceptional, though Terminator and Body Count were standouts. He added that the Menacer's small library made collecting easier. Edward Fox of The Centre for Computing History has said that the museum's Menacer is his favorite piece in the collection when used with the Aura Interactor haptic suit.

== Notes and references ==
Notes
