= Body Count (video game) =

1994 video game

- Developer: Probe Software
- Publisher: Sega
- Platform: Mega Drive
- Release: EU: July 15, 1994
- Genre: Rail shooter
- Modes: Single-player, multiplayer

Body Count is a 1994 rail shooter for the Mega Drive. It is one of the few games that make use of the Menacer light gun and the Mega Mouse.

== Gameplay ==
A hostile race of aliens have invaded the planet Earth. A lone soldier takes up arms to fight against the invaders and drive them away. The game plays as an arcade style shooter where the player shoots from the first person perspective. After a sufficient number of enemies have been eliminated, the player proceeds to the next area. At the end of the stage, the player must destroy a boss to move on to the next stage.

== Development and release ==
In the U.S. the game was released on the Sega Channel.

== Reception ==
Reception

Review scores
Publication	Score
Consoles +	84%
Hyper	83/100
Joypad	81% (Note: Joypad provided scores of 81% with the Menacer and 75% with the controller.)
M! Games	46%
Mean Machines Sega	62/100
Player One	85%
Superjuegos	91/100
Super Game Power	3.5/5
Video Games (DE)	42%
Mega	76%
Mega Force	84%
Sega Magazine	72/100
Sega Power	63%
Supersonic	85%
TodoSega	82/100

Body Count received average reviews.
