= ToeJam & Earl Productions =

American video game developer

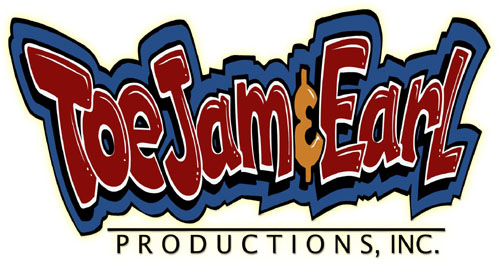
- Industry: Video games
- Founded: 1989
- Founder: Mark Voorsanger; Greg Johnson
- Defunct: 2003
- Headquarters: United States
- Products: ToeJam & Earl

ToeJam & Earl Productions, Inc. (1989–2003) was an American video game company founded by Electronic Arts developers Mark Voorsanger and Greg Johnson. Their best-known titles were Orly's Draw-A-Story (1996, Broderbund), and three games in the ToeJam & Earl series (1991–2003, Sega).

== History ==
Initially the company was known simply as Johnson Voorsanger Productions, or just "JVP" as they were credited in the original ToeJam & Earl and in its sequel Panic on Funkotron. After the success of the ToeJam & Earl games, the company was renamed to ToeJam & Earl Productions, Inc..

JVP introduced the ToeJam & Earl series with the original ToeJam & Earl, followed by Ready-Aim-Tomatoes (a mini-game for Sega's light-gun The Menacer), and the platformer-sequel ToeJam & Earl in Panic on Funkotron. Each was developed exclusively for the Mega Drive/Genesis and published by Sega. The third title in the series was ToeJam & Earl III: Mission to Earth (2003), co-developed by Visual Concepts for the original Xbox.

ToeJam & Earl Productions also created Orly's Draw-A-Story, a CD-ROM for kids ages five to ten. Orly's Draw-A-Story was designed for PCs and Macs, and was published by Broderbund.

== Disbandment ==
After poor sales of ToeJam & Earl III, the company disbanded in 2003. Mark Voorsanger went on to produce other Electronic Arts games for a few years, and then left the game industry to run a coaching business, Skyward Coaching, out of the same building where ToeJam & Earl Productions was located.

Greg Johnson continued as an independent game design consultant, then started his own video game development studio called HumaNature Studios, and currently owns the ToeJam & Earl intellectual property rights. His studio has developed and published multiple games, such as 2014's Doki-Doki Universe, which resembles some elements from the ToeJam & Earl series.

In February 2015, Johnson announced a new title from HumaNature Studios, ToeJam & Earl: Back in the Groove, which was developed independently from Sega and crowd-funded via Kickstarter. The game revisits the format of the original game, featuring 2D character models on 3D worlds with overhead perspective, and supports both online and local multiplayer. The game exceeded its funding target of US$400,000 in March 2015, and later attracted additional funding from Adult Swim Games. It was released on March 1, 2019, for all major current platforms.
