= Caveman Ughlympics =

1988 video game

Caveman Ugh-Lympics
- Cover art
- Developer: Dynamix
- Publishers: Electronic Arts; Data East USA (NES)
- Platforms: Commodore 64, MS-DOS, NES
- Release: Commodore 64: NA: 1988; PAL: 1988; MS-DOS: NA: 1989; NES: NA: October 1990
- Genre: Sports
- Modes: Single-player, Multiplayer

Caveman Ughlympics or Caveman Ugh-lympics is a 1988 Olympic-themed sports video game set in the Stone Age. It was developed for the Commodore 64 and MS-DOS by Dynamix and published by Electronic Arts. The Nintendo Entertainment System version was released by Data East as Caveman Games.

== Gameplay ==
Caveman Ughlympics is a Stone Age Olympics played using different combinations of keys on the player's keyboard or the NES controller. The game is made up of six events:

- Saber Race, where the player races against an opponent avoiding both obstacles and the sabre tooth tiger running behind.
- Matetoss, similar to the hammer throw, where the player has to spin their wife/husband and try to throw them as far as they can.
- Firemaking, where the player races an opponent to create a full-burning fire.
- Clubbing, where the player faces off against an opponent holding clubs on a cliff, trying to club the other off the cliff sides or deplete their life meter.
- Dino Race, where the player sits on a dinosaur and races against an opponent, avoiding obstacles on the course.
- Dino Vault, where the player has to pole vault over a Tyrannosaurus rex.

== Reception ==
Reception

Review score
| Publication | Score |
|---|---|
| Electronic Gaming Monthly | 5/10, 6/10, 4/10, 8/10 (NES) |

Computer Gaming World gave the game a positive review, saying the game is most enjoyable with 2-4 players. The game's humor was its most praised quality.

David Wilson reviewed the game for Computer Gaming World, and stated that "the next time you find yourself longing for those simpler times and looking for a way to sate the barbarian within, don't lose your cool—boot up Caveman Ughlympics instead."
