= Joe Ybarra =

American computer game producer

Joseph Ybarra (born ~1954) is an American producer and designer of video games. He left Apple Computer in 1982 to work at the new Electronic Arts that was founded by his fellow ex-employee Trip Hawkins. He was the original producer of the first Madden NFL.

As one of the original game producers at EA, Ybarra worked on acclaimed games such as M.U.L.E., Seven Cities of Gold, Starflight, and the first version of Madden NFL. Ybarra later served as the president of Infocom and produced MMORPGs for Sierra Online and Monolith Productions. He also held a position at Cheyenne Mountain Entertainment, which eventually filed for bankruptcy. In 2013, Ybarra launched a Kickstarter for a simulation game called Shackleton Crater, which ultimately did not meet its funding goals.

== Professional biography ==
Joe Ybarra worked at Apple Computer before leaving in 1982 to work at Electronic Arts, a startup company founded by his fellow ex-Apple employee, Trip Hawkins. There he became one of the original game producers and game designers at Electronic Arts in 1982 (along with Stewart Bonn, Dave Evans (Apple), Susan Lee-Merrow and Pat Marriott), where the concept of a game producer was created by Trip Hawkins. During this time he was the producer for video games including M.U.L.E. by Dani Bunten and Ozark Softscape, Seven Cities of Gold (also by Bunten), Starflight, and Dr. J. and Larry Bird Go One on One by Eric Hammond. Ybarra was also the original producer on the first version of Madden NFL.

He later became president of game publisher Infocom and produced MMORPGs for Sierra Online and Monolith Productions.

He had been working with Cheyenne Mountain Entertainment and its subsidiary FireSky on the Stargate Worlds MMO as Senior Vice President of Strategic Operations. However, Cheyenne Mountain Entertainment filed for bankruptcy on February 12, 2010 and no longer sells or operates Stargate: Resistance.

On March 11, 2013, Joe Ybarra announced a Kickstarter project for a simulation game called Shackleton Crater, billed as "the lunar colonization strategy game based on today's science and tomorrow's dream." It did not achieve its funding goals.

== Video games produced or designed by Joe Ybarra ==
- Alien Legacy
- Earth Orbit Stations
- M.U.L.E.
- John Madden Football
- Dr. J. and Larry Bird Go One on One
- Shadowbane
- Spellcraft: Aspects of Valor
- Starflight
- Stargate Worlds
- The Bard's Tale
- The Matrix Online
- Seven Cities of Gold
- The Shadow of Yserbius
