= Orly's Draw-A-Story =

1997 video game

Orly's Draw a Story
- Cover art
- Developer: ToeJam & Earl Productions
- Publisher: Broderbund
- Platforms: Windows; Windows 3.x Macintosh
- Release: 1997
- Genres: Activity, Design
- Mode: Single-player

Orly's Draw a Story is a video game released in 1997 by Broderbund. The game won the 1998 Interactive Achievement Award for Computer Innovation. The game is aimed at the 5-10 year old age-group and carries an age rating of 3+. It was designed by ToeJam & Earl Productions and released by Broderbund. The main character Orly is voiced by Alreca Whyte.

== Gameplay ==
It focuses around the two main characters, Orly, an 8-year-old girl and her anthropomorphic talking frog friend Lancelot who lives in Jamaica. The game features four unique stories narrated by Orly. The player is able to illustrate each of the stories with their own paintings, either original drawings or using ready-prepared objects. As Orly tells the story the user is asked to create an item such as a friend for a flying monster or a birthday present to give to Orly.

The objects become animated and are then used as part of the story. Clicking on the shutter opens up a series of template drawings that can be coloured by the player. At the end of the story, the user can choose to save or discard the picture and then view it back in full.

Additional features within the game include "Make A Storybook" where the player can create their own series of scenes and type text to make up their own story, while there is also a "Doodle Pad" for practicing drawing skills.

=== Stories ===
Each story has a unique storyline and the player is asked to design different objects and scenes for each one.

- "The Ugly Troll People"
- "The Strange Princess"
- "Lancelot, Bug Eater"
- "One Big Wish"

== Reception ==
Reception

Review scores
Publication	Score
All Game Guide	4.5/5
MacHome Journal	4/5
The Atlanta Constitution	A+

The game received positive reviews from video game reviewers, as well as prestigious non-gaming publications such as Computer Life and Newsweek, but was not a market success. All Game Guide's Lisa Karen Savignano wrote "This is a game full of ideas that will spark wonderful and creative stories from your child, both onscreen and off." She went on to say "The game is much better than most contemporary drawing games on the market... Don't be surprised if the game uncovers the storyteller in your own child and you are treated to some very imaginative stories." The Independent listed the game as one of the 50 best ways of boosting a child's brainpower in 1999.

=== Awards ===
After its release, Orly's Draw-A-Story won an award at the inaugural Interactive Achievement Awards in 1998 for "PC Creativity Title of the Year", triumphing over Disney's Magic Artist, Barbie Cool Looks Fashion Designer, Print Artist Platinum and The American Girls Premiere.
