= Starflight =

1986 video game

- North American box art
- Developers: Binary Systems; BlueSky Software (Genesis)
- Publisher: Electronic Arts
- Designer: Greg Johnson
- Platforms: Amiga, Atari ST, Commodore 64, IBM PC, Genesis, Mac
- Release: IBM PC August 15, 1986; Amiga, C64 1989; Atari ST, Mac 1990; Genesis; NA: October 7, 1991; EU: October 9, 1991
- Genres: Space trading and combat simulator, role-playing
- Mode: Single-player

Starflight is a space exploration, combat, and trading role-playing video game created by Binary Systems and published by Electronic Arts in 1986. Originally developed for IBM PC compatibles, it was later ported to the Amiga, Atari ST, Mac, and Commodore 64. A fully revamped version of the game was released for the Genesis in 1991.

Set in the year 4620, the game puts players in the role of a starship captain sent to explore the galaxy. There is no set path, allowing players to switch freely between mining, ship-to-ship combat, and alien diplomacy. The broader plot of the game emerges slowly, as the player discovers that an ancient race of beings is causing stars to flare and destroy all living creatures.

The game has been widely praised by both contemporary and modern critics, and is one of the earliest instances of a sandbox game. It led to the development of a sequel, Starflight 2: Trade Routes of the Cloud Nebula, and influenced the design of numerous other games for decades after its release.

== Gameplay ==
The player begins inside a space station called Starport orbiting the planet Arth. Here they buy and sell minerals, Endurium (fuel), and artifacts, recruit and train crew members, and upgrade parts of the ship. The player hires a crew from five species to man the ship's six posts: navigator, science officer, engineer, communications officer, doctor, and captain. A crewman's proficiency is determined by the relevant skill: a science officer with a high science skill can determine more of a planet's properties and detect aliens at a greater range, for example. Skills are increased through training, which must be purchased. One crewman can man multiple posts, but different species have different maximum skill levels. The ship is initially equipped only with engines and a limited supply of Endurium, a type of crystal used as fuel. The ship can be modified and upgraded through the purchase of weapons, armor, and shields.

The goals of the game include exploration, collection of lifeforms and minerals, and finding habitable colony worlds. Eventually, a larger goal of finding out why stars in the region are flaring dangerously and stopping the process, if possible, comes to the forefront. The main sources of income are selling minerals, artifacts, and lifeforms and recommending planets for colonization. The ship is equipped with a Terrain Vehicle that the crew can use to look for minerals and life-forms. The most lucrative source of income is finding planets suitable for human life. If the science officer's analysis shows a planet to be within acceptable parameters, the player can have the captain log a planet for colonization.

Starflight has 270 star systems, each containing from zero to eight planets for a total of 800. All star systems can be entered and all planets landed on, though this destroys the ship if the gravity is greater than 8.0 g. The science officer can scan and analyze the planet for information about it, including its temperature, gravity, and chemical composition. When a landing is ordered, a Mercator projection map shows the topography of each planet, as well as a cursor to select a landing point. Once the ship lands, a Terrain Vehicle can be deployed to drive across the terrain, which is periodically scanned for new information, in search of minerals, lifeforms, and alien ruins. As is the case in outer space, a heads-up display monitors the Terrain Vehicle's status.

Space is also crisscrossed with continuum fluxes, coordinate pairs that allow instantaneous travel between them without consuming fuel. Travel via fluxes cuts down significantly on fuel costs and travel time, though it causes all but the most accomplished navigators to lose their bearings.

Aliens may be cautious, friendly, or hostile, and all have distinctive speech patterns; the player can influence alien reactions by arming weapons and shields or hailing the aliens with varying communication styles. Alien ships can be also scanned for information. Combat involves maneuvering the ship and firing weapons, either instantly damaging short range lasers or avoidable, but more powerful long range missiles. The weapon used depends on how far away enemy ships are and what the player's ship is armed with. The player's ship has ablative armor and regenerative shields, and can take damage to its hull and individual components.

== Story ==
=== Setting ===
The galaxy is composed of eight space-faring races, five of which can be hired as part of the player's crew. Humans only exist on Arth and are not found among the stars. Other species include Veloxi, large insects who demand bribes from ships that violate their space; Mechan, androids left over from the days of the Old Empire; Elowan, a pacifistic race of sentient plants; Thrynn, reptile creatures who are primarily interested in money; Spemin, gelatinous blobs who are known for their cowardice; Gazurtoid, octopus-like religious zealots who regard all "air-breathers" as infidels; and Uhlek, a destructive fleet of ships with a hive mind. Humor also plays a role within Starflight.

=== Plot ===
The player's starship just outside of Arth's orbit, with the navigator engaging the maneuver command.

The story begins on the planet Arth, a haven for the survivors of the Old Empire. Due to heavy radiation, the inhabitants have been forced to live beneath the planet's crust for centuries. In recent times, the radiation has finally dissipated from the surface, allowing the population to unearth long-lost technology belonging to Arth's original settlers. The inhabitants of Arth have recently discovered two things: first, that they were once a colony world of Earth; and second, Endurium, a crystalline mineral that fuels interstellar flight.

An independent company called Interstel is dispatching ships to mine for resources, particularly Endurium. In addition, Interstel employees are instructed to seek information about Arth's history, alien artifacts, and planets with optimum environments for colonization. Early in the game, Arth scientists discover that stars throughout the local region of the galaxy are flaring, and the home planet of Arth is in danger.

By following clues given in Interstel announcements and through contact with alien races in space, the crew discovers an Old Empire starship adrift in space. An endlessly repeating distress call has been transmitting from the ship for over a thousand years. Before the fall of the Old Empire, a scientific expedition known as the Noah 9 left Earth in search of Heaven, a paradise world to which humans could immigrate. The expedition never arrived, leaving a fleet of Mechan ships forever waiting for their arrival. Once their coded questions are answered correctly, the Mechans assume that the crew is, in fact, the long-awaited Noah 9. Further investigation leads the crew to Earth, the home world of the Old Empire. The planet lies in ruins and is devoid of all life, but contains information about the history of Old Empire and its fate.

Additional clues are found in the Four Seedlings, a quadrilaterally symmetrical system made up of four suns. Centuries ago, the leaders of the Old Empire realized something hostile was causing aliens to flee from the center of the galaxy. The greatest minds from each of the races gathered at this location, where they discovered that a Crystal Planet was slowly eradicating all life. In a last act, they sent a human named Commander McConnell to end it, but he failed. At the start of the game, the Crystal Planet is slowly moving through the galaxy. The planet causes nearby stars to flare up and destroy all life in the system.

The player must explore solar systems, gather clues, and find special artifacts that grant access to the Crystal Planet, ultimately destroying it before the player's home system flares. Commander McConnell's last journal entry can be found on the surface of the Crystal Planet; in it, he shares his discovery that Endurium is actually a race of living, sentient beings who are being burned up as fuel for interstellar travel. Because their metabolism is extremely slow due to their crystalline makeup, they are not even aware of outside life and have come to view other races as a virus. The game is won after the player successfully plants an artifact on the Crystal Planet's surface and retreats back into space, causing the planet to explode, though the game can still be played after the Crystal Planet is destroyed.

== Development ==
Starflight was developed by Binary Systems, a five-man team consisting of Rod McConnell, Greg Johnson (lead designer), Alec Kercso (programming), Tim C. Lee (graphics and programming), and Bob Gonsalves (sound). Then-vice president of Electronic Arts Joe Ybarra was also closely involved as producer. The original idea for making a video game was conceived by McConnell and Ybarra in 1983. McConnell hired colleague Dave Boulton, who had an idea for using fractals to generate an endless virtual universe, along with Kercso, Gonsalves, Lee, and Johnson, all of whom were first time game designers. Boulton quit the project early on in development, saying it was too ambitious, with Lee replacing him.

The team coded the game mostly in Forth with a few key routines written in x86 assembly. Forth was chosen since it is easier to use than assembly and more compact. This was important because the game had to fit into 128 KB of RAM.

Genesis version of Starflight

It took "fifteen man-years" and three actual years to develop the game. In a 2006 interview, lead designer Johnson said: "I had never really designed a game before ... It's funny looking back on it now—just by happenstance I ended up creating a very open ended system where players could go anywhere and do whatever and a story sort of unfolded". Ybarra said that the game was almost cancelled more than once, and came out about a year behind schedule. Johnson was guided by his friend and office-mate Paul Reiche III, the designer of Archon, during a period where Reiche was "supposed to be working on Mail Order Monsters". Reiche advised Johnson to draft a "story network" that would highlight all the most important points of the story and list the in-game objects necessary to advance from one to the next. The designers rewrote the script multiple times. The group designed what they called a "fractal generator", which took six man-years to develop and allowed them to increase the number of planets in the game from 50 to 800. The game was one of the earliest to use procedurally-generated content for planets and everything on them. The techniques used created a type of roguelike environment on each planet, with the contents randomly distributed. The story network was also one of the earliest examples of a sandbox game design. They created a separate ecosystem generator over the course of two man-years of work. The alien names were created by randomly combining syllables until they had names they liked, and their code for simulating communications was rewritten four times before completion.

Starflight was released for PC on August 15, 1986. Originally available only on IBM, Tandy, and compatible PCs, it was released for the Amiga and Commodore 64 in 1989 and the Atari ST and Macintosh in 1990, and a Sega Genesis version was published in 1991. The Genesis version has new graphics, modifications to the ship, and upgrades for the Terrain Vehicle, including equipment to allow amphibious mining.

== Reception ==
Reception

Review scores
Publication	Score
Computer Gaming World	4/5
Electronic Gaming Monthly	6/10, 7/10, 6/10, 6/10 (GEN)

Awards
Publication	Award
Computer Gaming World	1987 Adventure Game of the Year
Computer Gaming World	Hall of Fame

By December 1987 Starflight sold over 100,000 copies, and eventually went on to sell over a million copies. Critical response to Starflight upon its release was extremely positive. Hartley and Patricia Lesser complimented the game in their "The Role of Computers" column in the December 1986 issue of Dragon, calling it "stunning in its presentation and play". In 1986 and 1987, Computer Gaming World declared it "the best space exploration game in years" and "the best science fiction game available on computer". The magazine named Starflight its Adventure Game of the Year for 1987, and in August 1988, it joined the magazine's Hall of Fame for games highly rated over time by readers, with the third-highest rating for action/adventure games on the list, and the fourth-highest overall. A 1994 survey of strategic space games set in the year 2000 and later gave the game four stars out of five, stating that "such rich NPCs offered additional suspension of belief".

Science fiction writer Jerry Pournelle named Starflight his game of the month for January 1987, stating that it was "as much a career as a game" and "fascinating". Fellow writer Orson Scott Card wrote: "Starflight is the first science fiction computer game that actually gives you something of the experience of roaming through the galaxy. ... I have found this game obsessively fascinating—and the graphics and player interface are superb". He called it the "Star Wars of science fiction games. Brilliantly designed and programmed ... the standard against which all other space-exploration games must be measured".

Compute! listed it in May 1988 as one of "Our Favorite Games", stating that "Starflight captures the feel of a certain type of science fiction ... the game can take hundreds of hours to play fully, yet those hours are anything but boring".

In the June 1990 edition of Games International (Issue 15), John Harrington patiently endured the first stage of ship building, but said that after the ship launched, "the game comes into its own [...] The sense of playing a small part in a grand story is very strong". He did point out some minor drawbacks, but concluded by giving the game an above average rating of 8 out of 10, saying that the game "incorporates [...] a depth and quality of imagination one has not come to expect from an industry obsessed with rehashing alien zapping shott-em-ups".

In 1996, Computer Gaming World declared Starflight the 55th-best computer game ever released.

Ybarra said in 1987 that the game had created a "beachhead in the arena of sci-fi" for Electronic Arts. Lee said in 2010 that he knew it was a classic while they were building it. Erin Hoffman of The Escapist in 2010 called it "one of the great breakthroughs in gaming". In 2012, Lee Hutchinson of Ars Technica called the game "a thing of awe and reverence" and said it "defined the genre of space exploration games".

In 1998, PC Gamer declared it the 36th-best computer game ever released, and the editors called it "the most authentic Star Trek experience you could have on a PC—and it wasn't even a Trek game".

== Legacy ==
A sequel was released in 1989: Starflight 2: Trade Routes of the Cloud Nebula.

Reiche was inspired by the game to create Star Control, with Johnson coding three of the alien species in the game; Computer Gaming World called Star Control II a spiritual successor to Starflight. Mass Effect director Casey Hudson tweeted in 2011 that "Starflight was a key inspiration for the ME series". Starflight is often cited along with Elite, which appeared two years earlier with similar gameplay, as early open world space exploration games. Dwarf Fortress's forgotten beasts were inspired by the procedurally generated lifeforms within Starflight.

Starflight was mentioned among GameSpot's list of ten games that should be remade; its expansiveness and depth, simplicity and elegance of game mechanics, and multi-level problem solving remain high-regarded in the early 21st-century.

It is freely available, albeit in streaming mode only, on the Internet Archive under AROS Public License copyright 1995–2016, courtesy the AROS Development Team. It is also readily available for download. Such is its legacy that there have been numerous fan remakes (some of which projects have failed).
