= GoPets: Vacation Island =

2008 video game

- Developer(s): 1st Playable Productions, Engine Software
- Publisher(s): Konami
- Platform(s): Nintendo DS
- Release: NA: March 26, 2008
- Genre(s): Virtual pet
- Mode(s): Single-player

GoPets: Vacation Island is a 2008 virtual pet video game for the Nintendo DS. It was developed by 1st Playable Productions and Engine Software and published by Konami. It was based on the 2004 web version of the game, GoPets. It was criticized for having less variety than the web version, however, because it was cloud based, one would have the ability to allow their pets to 'roam', and allow other pets to roam to their island, which added some. Communication is done entirely through 'Iku', which was described as "haiku with pictures". The game also contained various minigames.
