= ToeJam & Earl in Panic on Funkotron =

1993 video game

- European box art
- Developer: Johnson Voorsanger Productions
- Publisher: Sega
- Producer: Bert Schroeder
- Designer: Greg Johnson
- Programmer: Mark Voorsanger
- Composer: John Baker
- Series: ToeJam & Earl
- Platform: Sega Genesis
- Release: NA: December 1993; EU: January 21, 1994
- Genre: Platform
- Modes: Single-player, multiplayer

ToeJam & Earl in Panic on Funkotron is a 1993 platform video game developed by Johnson Voorsanger Productions and published by Sega for the Sega Genesis. It is the sequel to cult video game ToeJam & Earl, released in 1991. The game concerns two alien protagonists, ToeJam and Earl, both of whom have escaped from Earth, where they had crash landed. After returning to their home planet of Funkotron, the duo discover a number of antagonistic Earthlings have stowed away on the spacecraft and are wreaking havoc across the planet. The player must hunt down these Earthlings and imprison them in jars before sending them back to Earth.

The game's platform format was a departure from the original ToeJam & Earl, a treasure hunt game with randomly generated levels, inspired by the game Rogue (1980). Creators Greg Johnson and Mark Voorsanger originally began designing a game built on the concepts of the original, but changed to a more generic type of game due to a lack of support for their vision on the part of Sega. The game was critically well received, with reviewers praising the graphics, soundtrack, fluid action and two-player mode. It was also a commercial success, but fans of ToeJam & Earl were disappointed and confused by the radical change in direction.

Since its release, ToeJam & Earl in Panic on Funkotron has been criticized for being too sharp a departure from the first game, and some later reviewers felt that the developers had been more interested in the publisher's wishes than the fans. Johnson and Voorsanger have stated they regret moving away from their prototype sequel in the vein of ToeJam & Earl. Research has suggested that a significant minority of fans favor ToeJam & Earl in Panic on Funkotron as the best in the series. Together with its predecessor, the game comprises one of the Mega Drive's key exclusive franchises, but following Johnson and Voorsanger's split with Sega the series went inactive. A third installment appeared in 2002, but it was a commercial failure with mixed reviews. ToeJam & Earl in Panic on Funkotron was re-released in 2007 for the Wii's Virtual Console, receiving mixed reviews. The game was released on PlayStation Network and Xbox Live Arcade alongside its prequel in November 2012. The game was also re-released on the Nintendo Classics service on November 27, 2024. In August 2014, ToeJam & Earl 2 was listed on GamesRadar at #10 on "Best Sega Genesis/Mega Drive games of all time".

== Plot ==
The game follows on the events of the first game, in which funky aliens ToeJam and Earl crash landed on Earth. After managing to rebuild their spaceship and returning safely to their home planet of Funkotron, the duo soon learn that a bunch of Earthlings had stowed away on their craft and have now invaded Funkotron. With the humans spreading panic across the planet's citizens, even scaring the source of all funk, Lamont the Funkapotomus, away to another dimension, it is up to ToeJam and Earl to clean up the mess they've made and send all the Earthlings they brought with them back to where they came from.

== Gameplay ==
ToeJam (right) and Earl (left) leap over an antagonistic Earthling (below Earl).

Unlike its predecessor, Panic on Funkotron is a side-scrolling platform game in which up to two players play as ToeJam and Earl as they travel across Funkotron to capture antagonistic Earthlings that had stowed away. Players accomplish this by using a radar to locate an Earthling's proximity (some Earthlings may be hidden in the environment) and attack them with jars in order to trap and collect them. Once all Earthlings have been found, the player can move on to the next level. Players can collect presents containing various bonuses, such as super jars, radar scans, and teleporting moves. Coins can be used with parking meters to trigger events in the environment or participate in mini-games such as Jam Outs and Fungus Olympics. Players can also enter gateways leading to the Hyper Funk Zone, where the player must avoid obstacles in order to earn more presents. Hidden throughout the game are ten objects belonging to Lamont the Funkapotamus; collecting all of which will earn the player the best ending upon completion.

== Development ==
The game is the sequel to ToeJam & Earl, a treasure hunt game inspired by computer game Rogue and featuring randomly generated levels. After the success of the original game, Johnson Voorsanger Productions began work on a sequel in 1992. The developer spent three to four months building on the original mechanics, adding elements such as indoor areas and additional terrain types, though the randomly generated levels were removed. The plot of this prototype would see ToeJam and Earl "return to Earth to stage a rap concert, only to find they've lost their CDs" which would form the basis of the game's treasure hunt. According to the Johnson and Voorsanger, the game would feature "more default items" for the characters to "use all the time", new items and characters, and more detail and secret areas allowed by the fixed (rather than randomly generated) levels. The game employed a larger development team than the first installment and was originally projected for a Christmas 1992 release, and titled ToeJam & Earl 2. Sega however conferred that they did not "understand" the game and though the "decision was still ultimately with Johnson and Voorsanger", the developer started work on a more generic side-scrolling platform game, a concept to which Sega had been more receptive. The increased size of the game's cartridge over the original allowed for greater graphical detail. The soundtrack, including the original theme, was remixed and given a more layered quality.

== Reception and legacy ==
Reception

Review scores
Publication	Score	
Publication	Sega Genesis	Wii
Eurogamer	N/A	6/10
GameSpot	N/A	5/10
IGN	N/A	7/10

The game was met with considerable anticipation, positive reviews and commercial success according to IGN, with GamaSutra also recalling a positive critical reaction. A contemporary review in the Chicago Tribune called it a "beautifully designed game", as well as praising the Herbie Hancock-inspired soundtrack and non-violent action. The Washington Times also gave a positive verdict, stating: "This is one of the funniest games we've ever seen. The graphics are superb, and the action and control are flawless." Business Week wrote that "Sega knows what the kids find cool" with reference to the game. Mega placed the game at #14 in its Top Mega Drive Games of All Time. Fans of the original ToeJam & Earl, however, were disappointed and confused by the game's departure from the original concept to a more generic platforming format, with GameSpot and Shacknews later asserting that the game disappointed upon its initial release.

ToeJam & Earl in Panic on Funkotron and ToeJam & Earl comprised one of the Mega Drive's key exclusive franchises. However, following its release relations between Sega and the developers became antagonistic. Johnson and Voorsanger regained the rights to ToeJam & Earl from Sega in 1995. In early 1998, they said they were interested in making a new ToeJam & Earl game and asked fans to write in saying whether they preferred it to be like the first game or the second game and what platform they wanted it to be on, offering only non-Sega platforms as options. Their relationship with Sega softened in enough time for them to start work on a ToeJam & Earl game for the Dreamcast with Sega slated as the publisher, but Sega pulled support for the Dreamcast before it could be completed. A third installment, ToeJam & Earl III: Mission to Earth, was released for Microsoft's Xbox in 2002. The game returned to the concepts of the original game, but generated mixed reviews and poor sales.

Since its release, ToeJam & Earl in Panic on Funkotron has developed a negative reputation as a selling-out of a daring design. With hindsight, Johnson and Voorsanger have stated they regret moving from the prototype sequel to a side-scrolling platform game, though Johnson maintains "ToeJam & Earl 2 was a very original side-scrolling game". Johnson has further asserted that Toyoda Shinobu, who had been Sega's Vice President of Development, "admitted that it was probably a mistake on Sega's part to jump to a side-scroller". A survey by IGN found that a majority of the franchise's fans favored the original ToeJam & Earl as the best game in the series; however, a significant minority of respondents preferred ToeJam & Earl in Panic on Funkotron at 28%. Research by the game's developers showed that a majority of fans preferred ToeJam & Earl, though the developers also claimed that "Panic on Funkotron was loved and admired by many".

The game was re-released on the Wii's Virtual Console on June 1, 2007 in Europe and June 4, 2007 in North America. IGN felt the original game was superior, but praised the two-player cooperative mode, fluid animations and the "fair number of extras that add a lot of depth". GameSpot, however, called the game "mediocre", "forgettable" and "not much fun", though it noted the detailed "unique look" and parallax scrolling. Eurogamer, which gave the ToeJam & Earl re-release a negative review, praised the departure from the predecessor's concept, saying: "It gets some kudos at least for not following the 'more of the same' game sequel mentality." The reviewer praised the "forward thinking" environment interaction, but ultimately decided to give the game a middling score, saying: "For all its bold ideas, the basic platforming mechanic is pretty shonky".

The game was released alongside its predecessor as part of Sega's Heritage Collection on Xbox Live Arcade on November 7, 2012 and individually for PlayStation Network on November 6, 2012 in North America and November 7, 2012 in Europe.
