= Kung Fu Panda World =

2010 video game

- Developer: HumaNature Studios
- Publisher: DreamWorks Animation
- Release: NA: April 12, 2010
- Genre: MMOG
- Mode: Multiplayer

Kung Fu Panda World was a 2010 browser game. The game was themed after the Kung Fu Panda franchise of DreamWorks Animation, where players could move their character around a pre-rendered 2D world and participate in a variety of mini-games. Two and a half years in the making, the game was directed principally towards children. In July 2012, the game was discontinued and removed.

Players had to watch adverts to play or could purchase a subscription service for additional content.

The player creates their own character and chooses a fighting style, they then could play a variety of mini-games to unlock new items and skills used to level up, earn colored sashes and additional games.

Players voted on which games and activities were to be added into the game.

Parents were encouraged to also play and earn items for their children.
