= Doki-Doki Universe =

2013 video game

- QT3 and Balloon looking at each other.
- Developer: HumaNature Studios
- Publisher: Sony Computer Entertainment
- Platforms: PlayStation 3, PlayStation 4, PlayStation Vita
- Release: WW: December 2, 2013
- Genre: Adventure
- Mode: Single-player

Doki-Doki Universe (lit. Heart-Pounding Universe) is a video game published and developed by HumaNature Studios for the PlayStation 4, PlayStation 3, and PlayStation Vita. The game is unique in that its gameplay largely revolves around an interactive personality test. The game starts with a robot named QT3 and a talking red balloon accidentally getting left on an asteroid by a human family traveling through space. Roughly forty years later Alien Jeff locates QT3 and informs him that his model is being discontinued for lacking humanity. Alien Jeff has been tasked with determining if QT3, an emotionless and obedient robot, is capable of learning humanity. Alien Jeff then takes QT3 and Balloon to a planet called home.

== Gameplay ==
The only other inhabitant of Home besides QT3 and Balloon is Dr. Therapist, a therapist that gives psych evaluations of the player controlling QT3. Evaluations are based on answers given when a player visits asteroids. On asteroids small abstract tests of four or five questions are given with multiple choice answers. They range from "Choose a caption" to "Without thinking pick a picture". The more asteroids the player visits the more thorough an evaluation Dr. Therapist will make.

On Home there are four Machines to interact with: Pick a Planet Style, Pick an Intersteller Steed, Pick an Avatar and Pick a Friend's Planet to Visit. The online is only passive, allowing you to visit a friend's world and see how they decorated. Avatars change the appearance of QT3 and a new avatar is unlocked as the player levels up. Interstellar Steeds are mounts used to leave Home and visit other planets and asteroids. One Interstellar Steed is unlocked each level as the player gains experience points. Interstellar Steeds vary greatly from a flying rat to a pile of poop. Decorations are unlocked through missions and presents and can be placed anywhere on Home.

=== Graphics ===
The graphics are brightly colored and anime style. Every character on each planet is unique. Each planet has different decorations and backgrounds.

== Missions ==
Planets are full of Non Playable characters (NPCs) each with unique likes and dislikes. Simple mission structure includes summoning items to please or annoy NPCs and talking to a specific individual. A large part of the game is figuring out the likes and dislikes of NPCs by using Summonables to communicate. Summonables are pictures conveying vague ideas. One person may think a baby wearing a dirty diaper is funny while others may be uncomfortable with babies altogether. Each planet has a topic such as love, acceptance, bullying and individuality. Players can also find hidden decorations and summonables by lifting objects on each planet to uncover hidden gifts. There are 148 decorations and 330 summonables to unlock on 27 planets.

== Reception ==
Doki-Doki Universe received generally mixed to positive reviews from critics. Critics generally praised the premise of the gameplay, its open-world structure, well written dialogue, original personality tests, smart sense of humor and depth of themes and narrative, but otherwise criticized its general lack of challenge and repetitive gameplay structure, while the art style drew both criticism and praise. Some critics also cited its gameplay similarities to the game Scribblenauts. GameSpot critic Shaun McInnis gave the game a 7/10 score, citing delightful sense of humor, well-handed narrative and vibrant art style, while also criticizing its clumsy inventory screen and vague sense of progression. IGN also gave the game a 7.0 score, praising its unique concept and fun personality tests, but criticizing its repetitiveness.
