= Continuation novel =

Canonical sequel novel by a different author

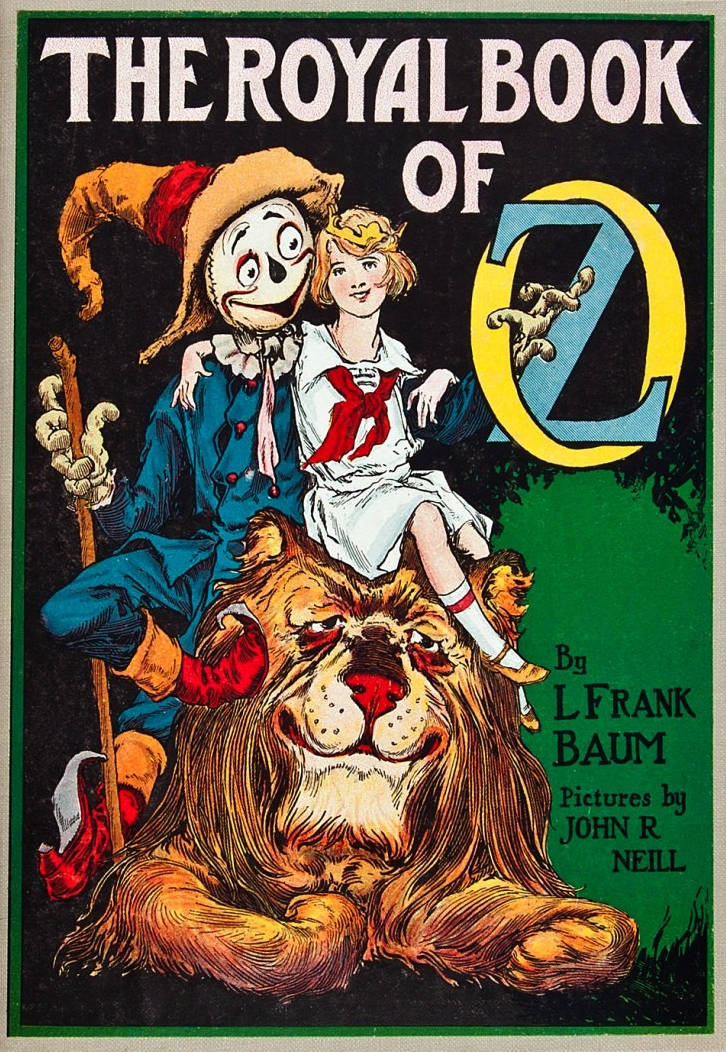
The Royal Book of Oz (1921) by Ruth Plumly Thompson, an official continuation novel of Oz books after the death of the original writer

A continuation novel is a sequel novel with continuity in the style and sometimes canon of an established series, produced by a new author after the original author's death.

Continuation novels may be official, produced with the permission of the late author's literary executors, or unofficial where the original author's works are now out of copyright.

== Official continuations ==
Where official continuations are produced, the novel will normally try to keep closely to the style of the original author in order to preserve the integrity and value of the literary franchise and the author may be legally required to do so.

Examples of official continuations include Porto Bello Gold by Arthur D. Howden Smith, the multiple authors that have continued Ian Fleming's James Bond series, including John Gardner, Raymond Benson, Anthony Horowitz and others; Young Sherlock Holmes by Andy Lane, The House of Silk by Anthony Horowitz and the 2014 Hercule Poirot continuation novel The Monogram Murders by Sophie Hannah, produced with the permission of the Agatha Christie estate. The estate also authorized Marple: Twelve New Stories, continuing Miss Marple in 2022. In 1998, Jill Paton Walsh completed the 1936 work Thrones, Dominations authorised by the estate of Dorothy L. Sayers to continue the Lord Peter Wimsey series. And Another Thing... by Eoin Colfer continues The Hitchhiker's Guide to the Galaxy series. Andrew Neiderman continued the novels of V. C. Andrews. Nick Harkaway completed the 2021 novel, Silverview (originally by John le Carré), then wrote the first full continuation novel Karla's Choice in 2024.

Some versatile authors have contributed to more than one continuation series. Sebastian Faulks is one such example. In addition to James Bond, Faulks has written the first ever authorized new P. G. Wodehouse Jeeves continuation story, Jeeves and the Wedding Bells, published in 2013. Several authors have published continuation novels of August Derleth's character Solar Pons.

If not done well, the continuation novel poses risks to the reputation of the dead author but writing one is also a risk for the new author as they are obliged to suppress their own style in favour of the style of an often better-known author and one whose fans may take convincing to accept the legitimacy of the new work. Faulks said of his Wodehouse continuation: "People said it was brave – or stupid. Either way, it was a ridiculous undertaking. PG Wodehouse is, by common consent, one of the great prose stylists of the 20th century. I didn't want to make a mess of it".

If the continuation is a success however, it may lead to substantial sales and, just as importantly, revive interest in and sales of the works of the dead author. For this reason publishers will sometimes commission a continuation novel if they feel that interest in the original author is beginning to wane.

== Unofficial continuations ==
Where the original works are out of copyright, however, the new author(s) are free to interpret the franchise in any way they wish subject to copyright protection for fictional characters. There are a large number of Sherlock Holmes and Wizard of Oz continuations, for instance, which vary in quality and authenticity. Such unofficial continuations, which may overlap with fan fiction and pastiche, may introduce completely new characters, change time periods, add or remove plot elements and make as many changes to the original formula as the author feels are useful.

To mark the 110th anniversary of the publication of The Tale of Peter Rabbit, Frederick Warne & Co. commissioned British actress Emma Thompson to write The Further Tale of Peter Rabbit, in which Peter ends up in Scotland after accidentally hitching a ride on Mr. and Mrs. McGregor's wagon. The book was released on September 18, 2012. Thompson later wrote more Peter Rabbit books. Her next tale, The Christmas Tale of Peter Rabbit, was released in 2013; this was followed by The Spectacular Tale of Peter Rabbit in 2014.

== See also ==
- Authors' rights – Right to exploit a creative work
- Continuator
- Klinger v. Conan Doyle Estate, Ltd.
- Lupin the Third
- Mashup novel
- Nichols v. Universal Pictures Corp.
- Parallel novel
- Protection of Classics
- Revisionism (fictional)
- Société Plon et autres v. Pierre Hugo et autres
- Sherlock Holmes pastiches
- Post-Fleming James Bond novels
- Suntrust Bank v. Houghton Mifflin Co.
- List of incomplete novels finished by other authors
