= Legal issues with fan fiction =

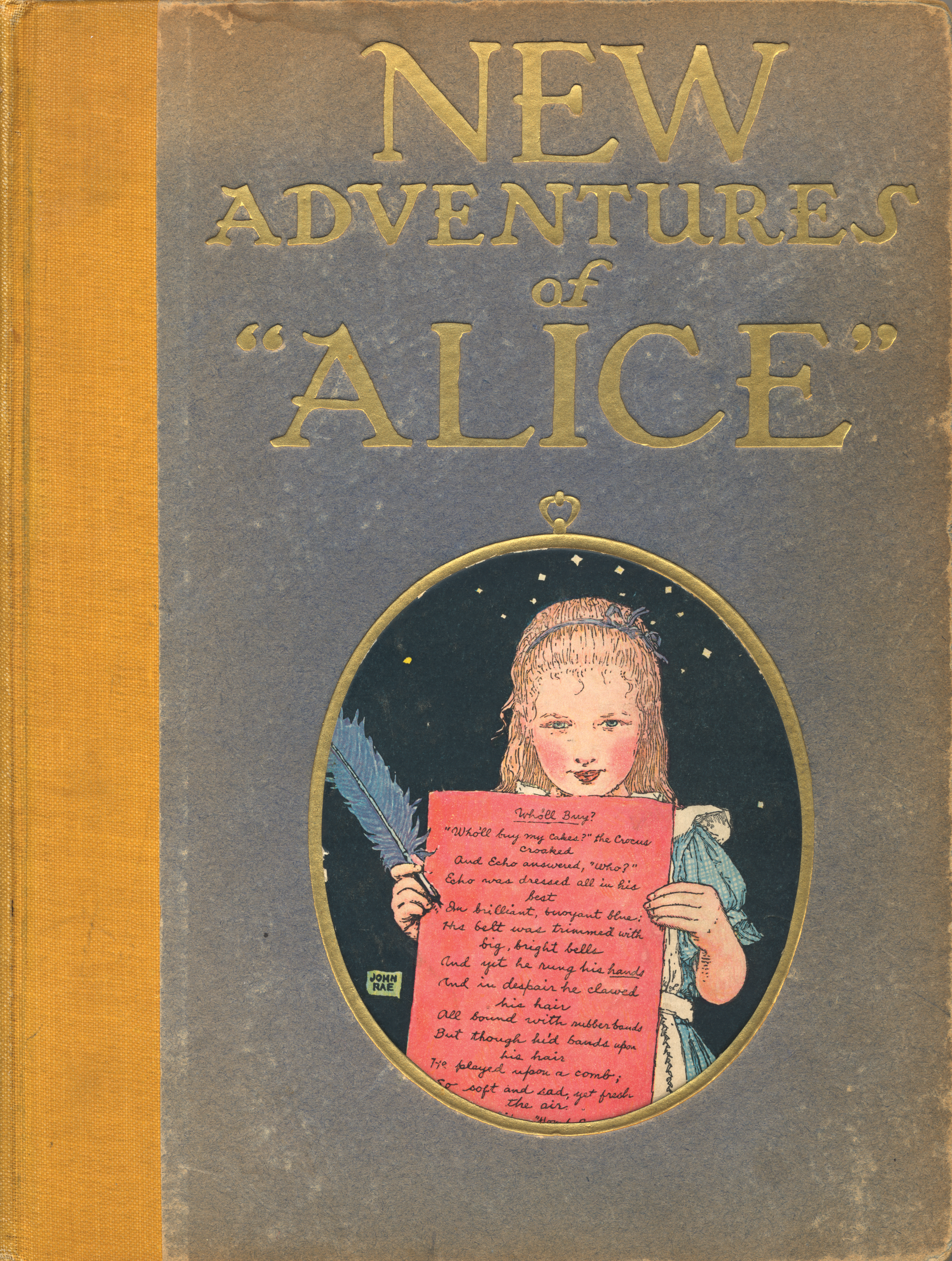
New Adventures of Alice, 1917, John Rae

Fanfiction has encountered problems with intellectual property law due to usage of copyrighted characters without the original creator or copyright owner's consent.

== Copyright law ==
Fan fiction often uses settings and characters from a previously created creative works and as such could be classified as a derivative work, which would place control of the copyright with the owner of the original work by the Berne Convention. This protection lasts for at least 50 years after the author's death, though other countries have longer terms.

As such, copyright holders have the option to take down some fan works on the basis of copyright infringement. These remedies range from takedown requests to monetary remedies or even injunction. For example, in the United States, the aftermath of Anderson v. Stallone, in which Sylvester Stallone successfully made a case against Anderson that the proposed script for Rocky IV violates copyright, resulted in the court enjoining Anderson from pursuing the creation of a movie or other published work based on his script.

Nevertheless, the Berne Convention allows nations to consider copyright exemptions with the "three-step" test, which could be argued to apply to some fan fiction.

=== Fair Use ===
United States copyright law has the fair use defense, where fan fiction that follows under fair use would not be liable for copyright infringement. In determining the applicability of the fair use defense to a secondary use such as fan fiction, courts consider the following four factors on a case-by-case basis:

1. "the purpose and character of the use, including whether such use is of a commercial nature or is for nonprofit educational purposes;
2. the nature of the copyrighted work;
3. the amount and substantiality of the portion used in relation to the copyrighted work as a whole; and
4. the effect of the use upon the potential market for or value of the copyrighted work."

Works of fanfiction are more likely to constitute fair use if they are "transformative" with respect to the original work, if they are non-commercial, if they appropriate relatively little of the original work, and/or if they do not tend to detract from the potential market for or value of the original work. While there are no bright-line rules, such genres as parody and criticism are enumerated by statute and case law as presumptively fair uses. There has been no case law that squarely addresses fanfiction in relation to fair use.

For example, in Salinger v. Colting, judge Deborah A. Batts permanently prohibited publication in the United States of a book by Swedish writer Fredrik Colting, whose protagonist is a 76-year-old version of Holden Caulfield of J.D. Salinger's The Catcher in the Rye. Judge Batts explicitly rejected arguments of parody and criticism by considering them as "post-hoc rationalizations employed through vague generalizations about the alleged naivety of the original."

In contrast, in Suntrust v. Houghton Mifflin Co., the United States Court of Appeals for the Eleventh Circuit considered Alice Randall's The Wind Done Gone to be a transformative work of Margaret Mitchell's Gone with the Wind based on the guidelines from the Supreme Court's Campbell v. Acuff Rose Music. Circuit Judge Birch found that the derivative work "[provided] social benefit, by shedding light on an earlier work, and, in the process, creating a new one," with Campbell establishing that the transformative value can outweigh other factors in the fair use test, like the derivative work being commercial and heavily based on the original.

=== Fair Dealing and Enumerated Copyright Exemptions ===
Many jurisdictions of the Commonwealth of Nations instead have fair dealing as a limitation to exclusive rights from copyright law. These exemptions are more enumerated and usually only applies to activities that fall under the categories, although common law courts in some jurisdictions are less stringent than others in this regard. The European Union also has an enumerated list of copyright limitations that member states can implement as per Information Society Directive Article 5. Though the exact categories and conditions may vary between jurisdictions, some categories like parody are considered fair dealing in multiple jurisdictions, including Australia, Canada, and United Kingdom.

Numerous legal experts have considered fan fiction to follow under various categories of fair dealing in these jurisdictions. In Germany, a legal expert under the Gesellschaft für Freiheitsrechte (GFF) argued that many forms of fan fiction as part of user-generated content would fall under the category of pastiche.. In Canada, in addition to parody and satire, fan-fiction could also fall under the non-commercial user generated content category established as part of fair dealing, though it needs to satisfy conditions like the new work not having an averse effect on markets and potential markets of the original.

=== Non-Prosecutions ===
Some jurisdictions may not have an explicit provision written out but considers copyright infringement from fan fiction only prosecutable if the rights holders file a complaint. In Japan, Prime Minister of Japan Shinzo Abe considered doujinshi fan fiction as shinkokuzai because they "don't compete in the market with the original works and don't damage the original creators' profits".

== Trademark law ==
Separate from the legal issues raised by fanfiction's interaction with copyright law, legal issues may also develop from United States trademark law.

Current federal trademark law follows the Lanham Act, otherwise known as the Trademark Act of 1946. Under the Lanham Act, a trademark is "any word, term, name, symbol, or device, or any combination thereof" used in commerce to identify a service or good. Under this definition, it is possible for the names and likenesses of television, film and book characters, fictional accounts, settings, or other elements of entertainment products to act as trademarks. Unlike copyright, however, trademark rights are not automatic. To establish a right in trademark, the rights-seeker must establish that their mark acts as a distinctive "source identifier" for a particular type of good or service. Thus, trademark rights may arise when a fictional character's name or likeness may serve to identify the source of an entertainment product or related good. For example, the use of Mickey Mouse's name or likeness may serve to identify a particular book or toy as originating from Disney. One way to establish that a mark acts as a distinctive source identifier is to establish that the relevant purchasing public has developed a strong association between the mark and its originating source. In legal terms, this is known as "secondary meaning."

If the trademark holder can show that its creation acts as a distinctive source identifier, they still must prove a likelihood of confusion to prevail in a trademark infringement claim. Different courts consider similar but not identical factors when deciding likelihood of confusion. Common factors that may be relevant to fanfiction include:

1. How well known and distinctive the mark allegedly being infringed is;
2. How similar the infringing mark is to the original mark;
3. How similar the allegedly infringing goods or services are to the markholder's goods or services;
4. Whether the infringer intended to deceive the purchasing public or to trade on the good will of the markholder;
5. The level of sophistication of those persons or groups likely to be the consumers of the mark;
6. Whether consumers were actually confused as to the source of the goods or services.

The courts can weigh the factors in individual cases, and may consider additional factors as they please.

To the extent that fanfiction uses source-identifying characters, settings and such, the marks are often well known are identical to the original, and are used in similar types of goods (i.e., written fiction). In this way, the first three factors relayed here weigh for the trademark holder.

However, fanfiction writers generally do not intend to deceive the consuming public as to the source of the work, and often include prominent disclaimers at the outset of their works stating that the works are not the products of the original creators, both to honor the original creator and to prevent any possible confusion as to source. In addition, as a consuming audience, fanfiction readers are generally sophisticated regarding works' status as fanfiction, and are aware that fanfiction is not written or endorsed by those who hold the trademarks. As such, the last three factors tend to weigh in the direction of fanfiction writers.

Trademark holders may also allege that the use of trademarked characters, settings, etc. may constitute trademark dilution. The concept of trademark dilution is that overuse or improper use of a mark, even when it does not create consumer confusion, can lessen the mark's uniqueness and value as a source identifier. A dilution claim requires that the mark in question be famous throughout general consuming public and that the use of the mark create a likelihood of either "blurring" or "tarnishment." A likelihood of blurring occurs when the use of the mark creates an association that is likely to impair the distinctiveness of the famous mark; a likelihood of tarnishment occurs when the use of the mark creates an association that is likely to harm the reputation of the famous mark.

Even if a likelihood of confusion or dilution were found, trademark law provides various defenses to alleged infringement. These defenses fall into the categories of "fair use" and "First Amendment."

Trademark "fair use" differs significantly from fair use under copyright law. In trademark law there are two types of fair use: descriptive and nominative use. Descriptive fair use permits the use of a descriptive mark in a descriptive way; for example, an advertisement could say that a particular dress shoe "feels like a sneaker" even though the phrase "Looks like a pump, feels like a sneaker" is the trademark of another company. Nominative fair use permits the use of a mark to identify the product that bears that mark, when (1) the product or service in question is not readily identifiable without use of the trademark; (2) no more of the mark is used than is reasonably necessary to identify the product or service; and (3) the user does nothing beyond use of the mark that would suggest sponsorship or endorsement by the trademark holder. For example, a news story about the New Kids on the Block can use the mark "New Kids on the Block" to identify the band. Nominative fair use is often particularly relevant to fanfiction, since a fanfiction writer's use of trademarked names, settings, etc. to identify characters, story settings, etc. will generally meet the three requirements for nominative fair use. For this reason, in fanfiction, making a successful case for trademark infringement is more difficult than for copyright infringement.

An additional defense to trademark infringement or dilution relies on the First Amendment guarantee of freedom of speech.

Courts have shown reluctance to curtail creative uses of trademarks in expressive works. For example, in Mattel, Inc. v. MCA Records, Inc., United States Court of Appeals for the Ninth Circuit permitted the band Aqua’s use of Mattel’s trademark in "Barbie" to sell songs, that MCA had a valid parody defense, as Aqua needed to use the word "Barbie" in its song "Barbie Girl," based on the fact that the use of the mark was (1) artistically relevant to the song and (2) not explicitly misleading as to the source of the song. Because there was a relatively small likelihood of confusion, the Ninth Circuit held that the First Amendment protected Aqua's use of the mark. The First Amendment defense has not stood up where the trademark holder was able to prove the existence of significant actual confusion. An example of this is a parodic publication running a parody ad for a product, and the parody not being well done enough or labeled clearly enough for people to realize it is not a real ad.

Because of these differences in the legal doctrines of trademark and copyright, trademark law is less likely to come into conflict with fanfiction.

A brief note on non-U.S. perspectives: while other countries do not necessarily weigh the interests of trademark owners and other speakers in the same way, noncommercial and expressive uses may receive protection under other nations' laws as well. For example, in South Africa, a T-shirt company was able to sell T-shirts parodying Black Label beer.

== Right of publicity ==
Many countries, and some U.S. states, have laws governing rights of publicity. In the United States, rights of publicity are governed by state statutes and state common law, and thus vary from state to state. As a general matter, the right of publicity grants a right to famous persons to control the commercial use of their "name, image and likeness," and sometimes extends to one's broader identity or persona. The case of White v. Samsung provides an example of the right of publicity protecting a celebrity's persona even when her name and likeness were not used: Samsung created an ad that pictured a robot in a blond wig and a red dress, in a pose that evoked Vanna White's work on Wheel of Fortune. White prevailed under California law on the theory that although Samsung had not used her name or likeness, it had used a recognizable depiction of her persona without permission for its commercial gain. Arguably, celebrities whose names, images, likenesses or personas are used in real person fiction, have the right to assert claims against fanfiction authors based on rights of publicity.

To date, though, no recorded right of publicity suits have been brought regarding noncommercial fan fiction about real persons. This may be, in part, because most states’ right of publicity laws only apply to uses for commercial gain. Despite the ruling in White, courts have shown hesitation in other suits to shut down even commercial artistic pursuits based on the right of publicity. Some courts have relied heavily on Circuit Judge Alex Kozinski's strong dissent from the White decision in order to deny a "Right of Publicity" claim. Others have relied directly on the First Amendment. In ETW v. Jireh, the U.S. Court of Appeals for the Sixth Circuit rejected a right of publicity claim brought by Tiger Woods against an artist who depicted Woods and other golf legends, holding that the transformative nature of the work exempted it from right of publicity liability under the First Amendment. In contrast, in Parks v. LaFace, the U.S. Court of Appeals for the Sixth Circuit held that the Outkast song "Rosa Parks" violated the civil rights icon's right of publicity because it was not sufficiently transformative. The court explained that the use of a name or likeness is not transformative for right of publicity purposes when it "is used solely to attract attention to a work that is not related to the identified person." Based on these cases, it is not clear that a court would be willing to abridge free speech by holding that fictional writing about a real person constitutes a violation of that person's right of publicity.

== Advocacy regarding the legality of fan fiction ==
In 2007 two UC Davis Law School professors argued in the California Law Review that "Mary Sue" fan fiction "that challenge the orthodoxy of the original likely constitute fair use". Citing Campbell v. Acuff-Rose Music, Inc.—which established that commercial parody can qualify as fair use if it can be perceived as commenting or criticizing on the original—and the subsequent Suntrust v. Houghton Mifflin, the authors wrote that "Similarly, many Mary Sues comment on or criticize the original, while at the same time create something new ... Mary Sues can be commercial and still be fair."

That year, a group of fans who engage in creating fan works and are part of the larger fan community founded the Organization for Transformative Works (OTW). OTW has since advocated the legitimacy of fan fiction due its transformative nature. OTW's position is that fan fiction and other fan labor products constitute copyright fair use under 17 U.S.C. § 107 because they add "new meaning and messages to the original" work, and thus fall under the exemption to U.S. copyright law the Supreme Court defined in Campbell and which was later revisited and followed in Suntrust. OTW's vision includes seeing "all fannish works recognized as legal and transformative and ... accepted as a legitimate creative activity." Toward this end OTW works to educate fan writers and published writers about copyright laws, particularly the open legal questions around fan fiction and other fan works.

OTW also maintains its own fan fiction archive, the Archive of Our Own, commonly called AO3. All fan fiction on the site is recognized as non-profit derivative works. While OTW provides a centralized netspace for fans to acquire knowledge and aid regarding their own creative works, and a voice for the fan community, it does not represent all fans. Fans have many different views on the legalities of fan works, from the pure question of whether these works are transformative, to differences in how fans feel fan works should be disseminated.

Fan writers who argue that their work is legal through the fair use doctrine use specific fair use arguments in the context of fan works, such as:

1. Fan works do not deprive the owner of the source material of income
2. Fan works may work as free advertisement and promotion of the original source material
3. Fan works are usually non-profit.
4. Fan works do not copy, or attempt to substitute for, the original work.

OTW is also not the only organization to support the idea that fan works are transformative. In Salinger v. Colting, the New York Times and other major media conglomerates filed an amicus brief supporting Colting's book, as did the Library Copyright Alliance.

== Copyright holders' attitude towards fan fiction ==
Some copyright holders have stated specific positive or negative attitudes towards fanfiction.

=== Examples ===
==== Studios, productions companies, and producers ====
Most major studios and production companies tolerate fan fiction, and some even encourage it to a certain extent. Paramount Pictures, for example, allowed the production of Star Trek: The New Voyages and Star Trek: The New Voyages 2 from Bantam Books, fan fiction anthologies which followed Bantam's Star Trek Lives! by reprinting stories from various fanzines; as well as Star Trek: Strange New Worlds, a series of ten anthologies from Pocket Books in which the short stories were selected through an open submissions process geared toward novice writers.

Due to the ongoing nature of television production, some television producers have implemented constraints, one example being Babylon 5 creator J. Michael Straczynski. His demand that Babylon 5 fan fiction be clearly labeled or kept off the Internet confined most of the Babylon 5 fan fiction community to mailing lists during the show's initial run.

Many writers and producers state that they do not read fan fiction, citing a fear of being accused of stealing a fan's ideas, but encourage its creation nonetheless. When Buffy the Vampire Slayer went off the air, for instance, creator Joss Whedon encouraged fans to read fan fiction during the show's timeslot.

==== Authors ====
While many authors (for example, Neil Gaiman, J.K. Rowling, D.J. MacHale, Stephenie Meyer, and Terry Pratchett) do not take issue with authors of derivative works, a number of authors do. They may request that fan-fiction archival sites remove and ban any pieces of fan fiction based on their original works. To date, no fan fiction archive has failed to comply with an author's request to remove works, and many archives feature a full list of authors whose work cannot be the source of a fan fiction on their site.

Fan fiction hosting sites like MediaMiner and Fanfiction.net have lists of authors whose fandoms are prohibited from their sites. MediaMinder states, "This is a right they [the copyright owner] have as an author or owner of the work. No copyright owner has to allow fan fiction or even tolerate it." Fanlore has a list of Professional Author Fanfic Policies that includes authors who support and authors who discourage fan fiction of their works.

J. K. Rowling has also complained about sexually explicit Harry Potter fan fiction. However, lawyers on behalf of Ms. Rowling specifically noted that she has "no complaint about innocent fan fiction written by genuine Harry Potter fans" and she "is happy for spin-offs to be published online as long as the publications are not sold and it is made clear she was not involved in the stories", under the condition that they do not contain pornography or racism.

In 2008, Steven Brust published a Firefly novel with a Creative Commons copyright notice.

Noteworthy in regard to the acceptance of fan fiction is Eric Flint, who has set up a formal site for the submission of fan fiction into his canon in the 1632 series at Baen's Bar and has to date (March 2015) published 58 issues of The Grantville Gazette in electronic form and six in book form. These feature fan fiction and fan non-fiction alongside his original work (paying first semi-pro, and now SFWA rates). Flint (a former labor organizer and socialist) contends that this collective work allows the expansion of his alternate history universe into something approaching the complexity of reality. It can be argued, however, that since work published in the Gazette is paid (at professional rates) and cleared by Flint for canonicity, that this is not actually "fan fiction" in the commonly-understood sense of the term.

Also noteworthy is the series of Darkover anthologies published by Marion Zimmer Bradley, beginning in 1980, consisting largely of fan fiction extended into her canon. These books led to a much talked about controversy. Bradley read something in a fan story that meshed well with a Darkover book she was currently writing, so she wrote the fan author, Jean Lamb, offering her "a sum and a dedication for all rights to the text." In a 1991 Usenet post, Jean continued, "I attempted at that point to _very politely_ negotiate a better deal. I was told that I had better take what I was offered, that much better authors than I had not been paid as much (we're talking a few hundred dollars here) and had gotten the same sort of 'credit' (this was in the summer of 1992)...a few months later I received a letter from Ms. Bradley's lawyer threatening me with a suit." After Bradley's death, more information has come out supporting the fan's story. The rumor, however, was that Bradley had a skirmish with a fan who claimed authorship of a book identical to one Bradley had published and accused Bradley of "stealing" the idea, and the resultant lawsuit cost Bradley a book. Either way, her attorney advised her against reading fan fiction of her work. Versions of this incident are credited by many to have led to a "zero tolerance" policy on the part of a number of other professional authors, including Andre Norton, and David Weber. Mercedes Lackey used to strictly disallow any posting of fan fiction set within her universes on the Internet, though she did allow stories to be published in approved fanzines with signed releases for each story. Recently, she has changed her stance to allow nonprofit fan fiction of her works so long as the fan fiction is licensed as a derivative work and uses a Creative Commons license.

Anne Rice objected to fan fiction based on any of her characters (mostly those from her famous Interview with the Vampire and its sequels in The Vampire Chronicles) or other elements in her books, and she formally requested that FanFiction.Net remove stories featuring her characters. However, in 2012, Metro reported that Rice has taken a milder stance on the issue: "I got upset about 20 years ago because I thought it would block me," she said. "However, it’s been very easy to avoid reading any, so live and let live. If I were a young writer, I’d want to own my own ideas. But maybe fan fiction is a transitional phase: whatever gets you there, gets you there." Similar efforts have also been taken by Annette Curtis Klause, Robin Hobb, George R.R. Martin, and Robin McKinley among others. Many authors do this, they state, in order to protect their copyright and especially to prevent any dilution, saturation, or distortion of the universes and people portrayed in their works.

Sharon Lee and Steve Miller, creators of the Liaden universe, strongly oppose fan fiction written in their universe. "I don’t want “other people interpreting” our characters. Interpreting our characters is what Steve and I do; it's our job. Nobody else is going to get it right. This may sound rude and elitist, but honestly, it's not easy for us to get it right sometimes, and we’ve been living with these characters. . .for a very long time... We built our universes, and our characters; they are our intellectual property; and they are not toys lying about some virtual sandbox for other kids to pick up and modify at their whim. Steve and I do not sanction fanfic written in our universes; any such work that exists, exists without our permission, and certainly without our support."

In an author's note in The Ringworld Engineers, Larry Niven stated that he was finished writing stories in the Known Space universe, and that "[i]f you want more Known Space stories, you'll have to write them yourself." Internet writer Elf Sternberg took him up on that offer, penning a parody in which members of Niven's hyper-masculine Kzin species engage in gay sex and BDSM. Niven responded by denouncing Sternberg's story in the introduction to Man-Kzin Wars IV (Baen Books, 1991) and issuing a cease-and-desist for copyright violation. To date, Sternberg holds that the story is constitutionally protected parody, while Niven maintains that it is a copyright violation that lies outside of protected speech, though he has not legally pursued the matter further.

Some authors have said that they wrote fan fiction before they were published, or are pro-fan fiction. Naomi Novik has mentioned writing fanfic for television series and movies, and says she'd be thrilled to know that fans were writing fanfic for her series (though she also said she'd be careful not to read any of it); Anne McCaffrey allowed fan fiction, but had a page of rules she expected her fans to follow; Anne Harris has said, "I live for the day my characters get slashed"; Tamora Pierce stated on her website that she began writing The Lord of the Rings and Star Trek fanfiction and has no issue with fanfictions based on her works, provided they are non-profit. Author Cassandra Clare was a popular Harry Potter fanfiction author before she published her first novel.

=== Changing and selective policies ===
Copyright holders may have been changing their policies towards fan fiction. Some companies like CBS and Lucasfilm Ltd., which had been historically hostile to fan fiction, changed parts of their model in order to be more fan friendly. This included trying to encourage fan works and integrating them into official sites.

When not hosting the fan fiction or being openly tolerant of existing fan sites, companies created partnerships with other companies like FanLib to aid them in the task. The reaction from fans to such alliances and interference in their activities has been mixed, with some people thinking that it violates the basic rules of fan fiction communities. Those fans seem to be increasingly in the minority, as acceptance of such interference is tolerated because of the positives that can result.

The attitude of copyright holders toward incorporating fan fiction into the canon varies. Some copyright holders, such as the BBC in the case of Doctor Who, have mechanisms to allow for unsolicited submissions of stories into the official canon, and it is also the case that the writers of canon stories have sometimes been recruited from the ranks of fan fiction writers. In the case of the Doctor Who novels published by Virgin Books, once the BBC reclaimed the license to publish novels regarding the Doctor, many readers immediately categorized all the Virgin New Adventures as non-canonical fan fiction.

== Legal issues with fan fiction outside the United States ==
In Great Britain, Discworld author Terry Pratchett, up until the point of his death in 2015, emphasized that he was careful not to read fanfics, and had voiced the opinion that "everything works if people are sensible" and didn't mind "so long as people don't put it where I can trip over it". However, Pratchett emphasized that the Discworld and all its characters are ultimately his intellectual property, and stressed that "it is not a franchise".

Neil Gaiman, another English author who has written such works as Stardust, Coraline, and American Gods, says he does not mind fan fiction as long as the author notes that the characters are the intellectual property of another and so long as the fiction is not for profit.

In addition, fanfiction may be legal in the UK following passage into law of an exception to copyright for the purpose of caricature, parody, or pastiche.

In countries such as Russia and China, where copyright laws are more lenient or less well enforced, it is not uncommon to see fan fiction based on the work of popular authors published in book form. Sergey Lukyanenko, a popular science fiction author, went as far as to incorporate some fan fiction based on his stories into official canon (with permission of the writers of the said fan fiction). Perhaps the most famous case, however, is Dmitri Yemets' Tanya Grotter book series, a "cultural response" to Harry Potter, which provoked a lawsuit from J. K. Rowling. There is also a well-known fanfiction of The Lord of the Rings, The Last Ringbearer by Kirill Yeskov, that has been translated into several languages, including English, but the English translation was not printed, for fear of legal action by the Tolkien Estate. In 2010 the English translation was released as a free ebook.

In Japan, the dōjinshi subculture is similar to a combination of the United States subcultures surrounding underground comics, science fiction fanzines, and fan fiction. The dōjinshi artists rarely secure the permission of the original creator. Many dōjinshi works are manga-format fan fiction, which in Japan is, while not strictly legal, generally tolerated and usually encouraged, being looked upon as a form of free advertising or a breeding ground for new talent, most famously the group CLAMP and Love Hina author Ken Akamatsu.

== Intellectual property of fanfiction creators ==
While they do not hold the rights to the original media upon which a fanfiction is based, fanfiction writers' own works are their intellectual property. In 2022, the AI software Sudowrite was found to have trained the AI on material it did not have legal rights to, including fanfics. The publisher Plush Books was accused of copying fanfics and publishing them for profit without crediting the authors.

== See also ==
- Copyright abolition
- Copyright alternatives
- Criticism of copyright
- Copyright protection for fictional characters
- Free-culture movement
- Protection of Classics
- Société Plon et autres v. Pierre Hugo et autres
