= Stardock Systems, Inc. v. Reiche =

2018 legal case

- Court: United States District Court for the Northern District of California
- Full case name: Stardock Systems, Inc. v. Paul Reiche III and Robert Frederick Ford
- Decided: December 27, 2018
- Citations: Stardock Systems, Inc. v. Reiche, No. 17-cv-07025-SBA, 2018 WL 7348858 (N.D. Cal. Dec. 27, 2018)

Court membership
- Judge sitting: Saundra Brown Armstrong

Keywords
- United States copyright law, United States trademark law, Digital Millennium Copyright Act

Stardock Systems, Inc. v. Paul Reiche III and Robert Frederick Ford, 2018 WL 7348858 (N.D. Cal. Dec. 27, 2018) is a legal case that led to a settlement confirming an intellectual property split for the Star Control series of games. After a motion at the United States District Court, the parties agreed that series creators Paul Reiche III and Fred Ford owned the copyrights for the games Star Control (1990) and Star Control II (1992), while Stardock owned the Star Control trademark, with neither side using each other's intellectual property in future releases.

The Star Control copyrights were separated from the trademark in the early 2000s. Accolade allowed their copyright license to expire and revert to Reiche and Ford, who re-released Star Control II as The Ur-Quan Masters. Meanwhile, Accolade's assets were acquired by Atari SA, who later declared bankruptcy in 2013. Stardock purchased Atari's Star Control assets in a bankruptcy auction, leading the parties to acknowledge that Reiche and Ford retained their copyrights, while Stardock owned the trademark. In 2017, each side accused the other of violating their rights: Stardock was selling the original games without Reiche and Ford's consent, whereas Reiche and Ford announced a sequel to Star Control II without Stardock's consent. Stardock filed a lawsuit, and Reiche and Ford counterclaimed that Stardock was unlawfully selling their games and misappropriating their work in the then-upcoming game Star Control: Origins. Stardock responded by filing trademarks in character names from the original Star Control games.

In late 2018, Stardock's request for an injunction against a copyright takedown was denied by Judge Saundra Brown Armstrong. Steam and GOG.com removed the games from their stores, but restored Origins after Stardock agreed to accept responsibility for any potential infringement. In 2019, both sides agreed to a settlement, with Reiche and Ford owning the copyright to Star Control I and II, and Stardock owning the Star Control trademark. Both series would remain separate, with Reiche and Ford avoiding use of the original name, and Stardock avoiding use of the original fictional universe.

== Intellectual property history ==
=== Original Star Control series ===
Star Control and Star Control II were created by Paul Reiche III and Fred Ford and published by Accolade. Released in 1990 and 1992 respectively, both games received numerous awards. Journalists have listed Star Control among their best games of all time, with Star Control II earning even more "best game" rankings through the 1990s, 2000s, and 2010s. It is also ranked among the best games in several creative areas, including writing, world design, character design, and music.

Star Control was Ford and Reiche's first collaboration. The sequel was more ambitious, forcing the duo to ask their creative friends for help, and forcing Ford to financially support the team when the production went over schedule. Accolade asked Ford and Reiche to make a third game at the same budget, which they turned down to pursue other projects. As Reiche and Ford held the copyrights over first two Star Control games, Accolade licensed Reiche and Ford's designs to make Star Control 3 with a different team. Released in 1996, Star Control 3 did not enjoy the acclaimed legacy of the first two games, with reviewers noting the change in authorship. Accolade's plans for a fourth Star Control game were ultimately cancelled during development, and fans continued to demand a new Star Control game well into the late 2000s.

The 1992 Star Control II cover describes Paul Reiche III and Fred Ford as the Copyright holders, with Accolade holding the trademark.

=== Separation of rights ===
By the early 2000s, the Accolade's publishing agreement with Reiche and Ford expired. This was triggered by a contractual clause when the games were no longer generating royalties, allowing the copyrighted content to revert to Reiche and Ford. As the games were no longer available in stores, Reiche and Ford wanted to keep their work in the public eye, to maintain an audience for a potential sequel. Reiche and Ford still owned the copyrights in Star Control I and II, but they could not successfully purchase the Star Control trademark, leading them to consider a new title for a potential follow-up. This led them to remake Star Control II as The Ur-Quan Masters, which they released in 2002 as a free download under an open source copyright license. The official free release prevented the game from becoming abandonware.

Meanwhile, the Star Control trademark was transferred to Infogrames Entertainment. This happened when Star Control publisher Accolade sold their company to Infogrames in 1999, who merged with Atari and re-branded under the Atari name in 2003. In 2011, GOG.com began selling a Star Control re-release on their digital store. Ford contacted the sales platform, saying they could not sell the games without permission, leading GOG.com to separately license the Star Control trademark from Atari, and the games themselves from Reiche and Ford.

Atari declared bankruptcy in 2013, and their assets were listed for auction. Stardock became the top bidder on Atari's Star Control intellectual property. Upon hearing the news, Paul Reiche indicated that he still owned the copyright in the original Star Control games, so Stardock must have purchased the Star Control trademark, and this was confirmed by Stardock. Indeed, the Atari asset purchase agreement listed two assets sold to Stardock: the Star Control trademark and the Star Control III copyright. As Stardock began developing their new Star Control game, they re-iterated that they did not acquire the copyright to the first two games, and that they would need a license from Reiche and Ford to use their content and lore. Reiche and Ford echoed this understanding in a 2015 Game Developer Conference interview, stating that Stardock's game would use the Star Control trademark only.

== Legal dispute ==
=== Facts ===
A promotional image from Stardock published by Ars Technica in September 2017, illustrating Stardock's planned connection between Star Control: Origins and a "Future Fred Paul Sequel"

In September 2015, Stardock announced that their new game Star Control: Origins would be a prequel to Star Control. Through email, Stardock asked Reiche and Ford for a license to use their character designs, but the duo repeatedly declined. By 2016, Stardock described Origins as an alternative timeline in the same Star Control multiverse, but with none of the older games' characters, to avoid infringing on Reiche and Ford's copyrighted lore. Despite Stardock's continued offers, Reiche and Ford declined to collaborate on Origins, citing a desire to create their own sequel once they finished their ongoing projects with Activision.

In October 2017, Stardock began selling the older Star Control games via the Steam store, as a promotion for Origins. Through email, the parties began to dispute what legal rights Stardock had purchased from Atari, and whether that included distribution rights over the original series. Despite private negotiations, Stardock declined to stop selling the games, leading Reiche and Ford to formally request that Steam remove the original series from their store via a Digital Millennium Copyright Act (DMCA) takedown notice. Stardock formally contested the notice, and the sales continued. When Reiche and Ford publicly announced that they did not consent to Stardock's sale of the original series, Stardock announced that they had purchased the Star Control publishing rights from Atari, while Reiche and Ford responded that Atari's publishing rights had lapsed by Atari's own admission.

Also in October, Reiche and Ford announced Ghosts of the Precursors as a direct sequel to Star Control II. Initially, Stardock supported this announcement for Ghosts of the Precursors as a "true sequel to Star Control 2", and claimed their new Origins game would take place in an alternate universe that split off from the original series' universe. By December 1, Reiche and Ford announced that Stardock had not negotiated their legal permissions, and that "our games' universe has absolutely no connection, hyper-dimensional or otherwise". Responding to allegations that Stardock threatened to stop Reiche and Ford from releasing Ghosts of the Precursors, Stardock announced their lawyers would handle the dispute.

Stardock claimed that Reiche and Ford's blog post about Ghosts of the Precursors infringed the Star Control trademark by featuring the Star Control II cover art.

=== Trademark claim ===
On December 8, 2017, Stardock filed a lawsuit against Reiche and Ford in the U.S. District Court for the Northern District of California. Stardock's main contention was that their Star Control trademark was infringed when Reiche and Ford announced Ghosts of the Precursors as a "direct sequel" to Star Control II. Stardock further contended that Reiche and Ford were not the creators of Star Control, and were misleading consumers about their involvement in the series. In the months that followed, Stardock applied for more than 20 new trademarks, and filed an amended claim in March 2018 to claim ownership over them. These trademark applications included names of alien races from the original Star Control, and the mark The Ur-Quan Masters. If authorized by the United States Patent and Trademark Office, Stardock's new trademarks could have the effect of preventing Reiche and Ford from using those aliens in a new game. When correspondence surfaced that Stardock planned to use The Ur-Quan Masters and Star Control trademarks to shut down criticism from both games' fan forums, Stardock CEO Brad Wardell responded that this was a moment of anger and he had no intention of actually doing so.

=== Defense and copyright counterclaim ===
In February 2018, Reiche and Ford answered Stardock's complaint by asserting several defenses, as well as raising a counterclaim against Stardock for copyright infringement. Reiche and Ford argued that their Ghosts of the Precursors announcement did not infringe Stardock's trademark, and suggested that Atari's trademark renewal was invalid given that Star Control was not used in trade for several years. Reiche and Ford also counterclaimed that Stardock was liable for copyright infringement due to Stardock's unauthorized use of characters and designs from Star Control I and II, and unauthorized sale of the original games. Reiche and Ford further pointed out that Stardock had no valid copyright or distribution rights because, under their original contract, Accolade had lost those rights in 2001 when it ceased to sell the games in stores. Reiche and Ford also represented that they never authorized Atari or Stardock to distribute their games, but that they did authorize GOG.com. Reiche and Ford further contested Stardock's claim over The Ur-Quan Masters trademark, and alleged that Stardock had misled customers about the duo's involvement with Origins.

== Settlement discussions ==
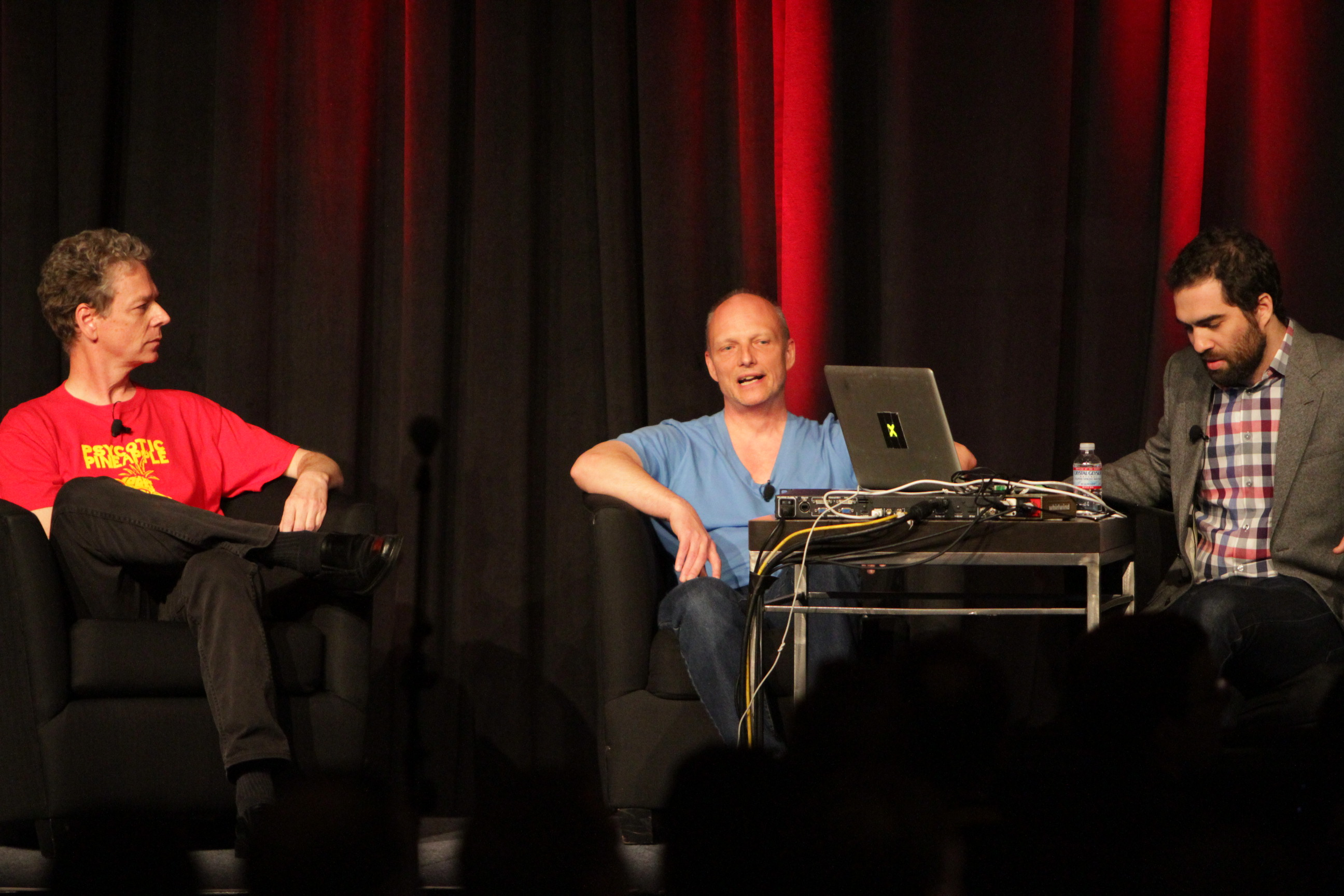
In a 2015 Game Developers Conference interview, Reiche and Ford stated that they held the copyright in the first two games. Stardock later sued them personally in 2017.

In March 2018, Reiche and Ford described an alleged settlement offer made by Stardock, asking Reiche and Ford to compensate Stardock US$225,000 in damages, assign their Star Control intellectual property to Stardock, and refrain from making any game in the same genre as Stardock for five years. Reiche and Ford rejected this settlement as "unfathomable". Stardock responded that the two has misrepresented the terms of the confidential settlement offer, leading Reiche and Ford to publish the settlement offer publicly. A week later, the court ordered the parties to keep all settlement negotiations confidential. As Reiche and Ford were sued personally, they turned to crowdfunding to pay for some of their legal costs.

== Ruling on Stardock's motion for preliminary injunction ==
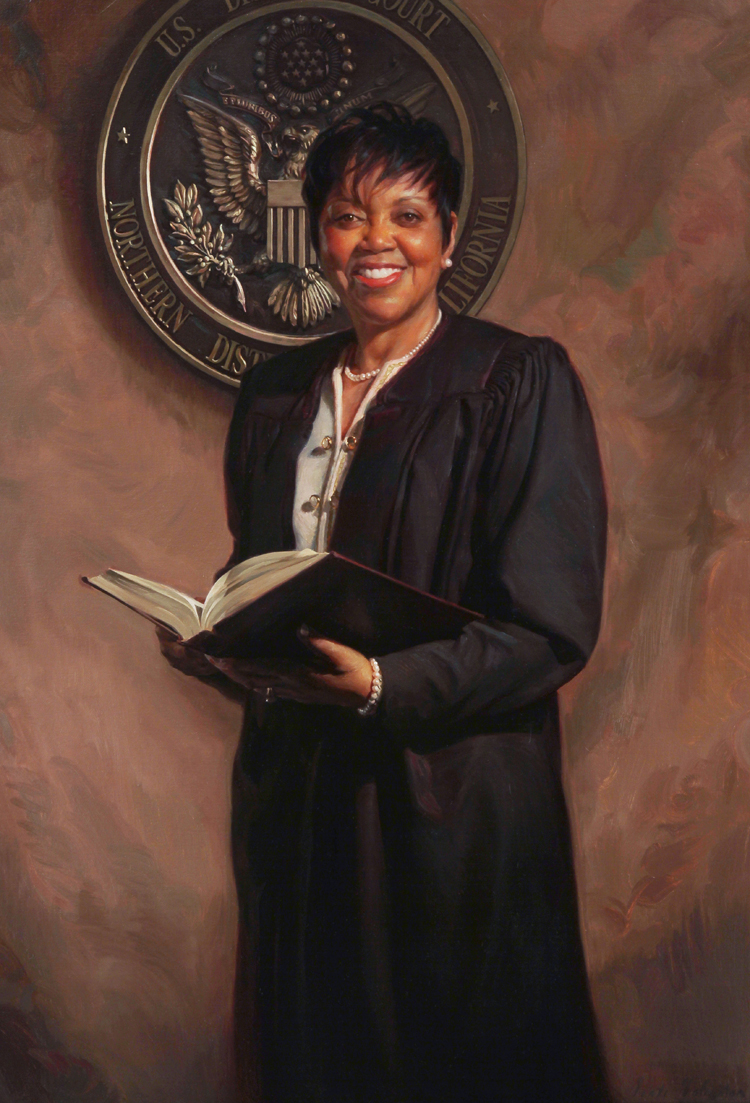
In her 20-page order, Judge Saundra Brown Armstrong denied Stardock's motion for an injunction against Reiche and Ford.

On September 7, 2018, Stardock filed a motion with the Court requesting a preliminary injunction preventing Reiche and Ford from issuing a DMCA takedown notice against Stardock's forthcoming Origins game. Judge Saundra Brown Armstrong denied Stardock's request on December 27, 2018, agreeing with Reiche and Ford that Stardock had been aware of the intellectual property issues by their own admission, but still started work on a potentially infringing product, calling the situation one of Stardock's own making. Describing some of the claims as "frivolous", Judge Armstrong wrote:

Defendants [(Reiche and Ford)] object to Wardell's declaration [that] "Stardock has not incorporated any copyrightable artwork from Star Control I, Star Control II or Star Control III into the Origins game itself," on the ground that Wardell lacks the expertise necessary to opine as to what constitutes "copyrightable artwork". Indeed, not only has Wardell failed to establish any such expertise, but his opinion as to whether the work in question is "copyrightable" constitutes an improper legal conclusion. Such legal conclusions are without evidentiary value.

...

Plaintiff [(Stardock)] had knowledge of Defendants' copyright claims from the outset. Despite that knowledge, it developed potentially infringing material without resolution of the IP ownership issues, and then publicized the release of that material during the pendency of this action. It now claims that its investment in Origins and reputation are on the line. Given that Plaintiff largely created the foregoing predicament, the Court is disinclined to extricate Plaintiff from a peril of its own making.

After the ruling, Reiche and Ford issued a DMCA takedown notice to Steam and GOG.com. Stardock did not file a counter-notice, and the games were subsequently removed from sale at the beginning of 2019. Reiche and Ford defended the DMCA takedown requests by pointing out that the substantial similarities between Origins and Star Control II were evidence of intentional copying, in violation of copyright. Later that month, both Steam and GOG.com restored Origins for sale. When Stardock owner Brad Wardell mentioned that the digital stores had reviewed and reconsidered the takedown, Polygon revealed correspondence where Stardock offered to accept potential copyright liability and secure both stores from the consequences of litigation.

== Settlement and intellectual property split ==
In June 2019, the parties agreed to a settlement, with Reiche and Ford owning the right to continue their series, while Stardock owns the right to use the Star Control name for a separate game. Reiche and Ford would use a new name for their fictional universe, while Stardock promised to avoid using any plots, characters, or locations that would infringe on Reiche and Ford's copyrights. Both sides agreed that Stardock will own the Star Control trademark, and Reiche and Ford will own the Ur-Quan Masters trademark, with a perpetual trademark license to the Ur-Quan Masters fan community for their open source project. As part of this, Stardock dropped their trademark claims to the alien names from the first two games. Reiche and Ford also agreed to remain quiet about Ghosts of the Precursors for a few years, and rename their eventual sequel. Reiche and Ford later announced Free Stars: Children of Infinity as a sequel to The Ur-Quan Masters, which they re-released under the new "Free Stars" series name.

== See also ==
- Copyright protection for fictional characters
- Anderson v. Stallone
- DC Comics v Mark Towle
- Nichols v. Universal Pictures Corp.
- Suntrust Bank v. Houghton Mifflin Co.
