= Parallel novel =

Pastiche novel with in-universe continuity

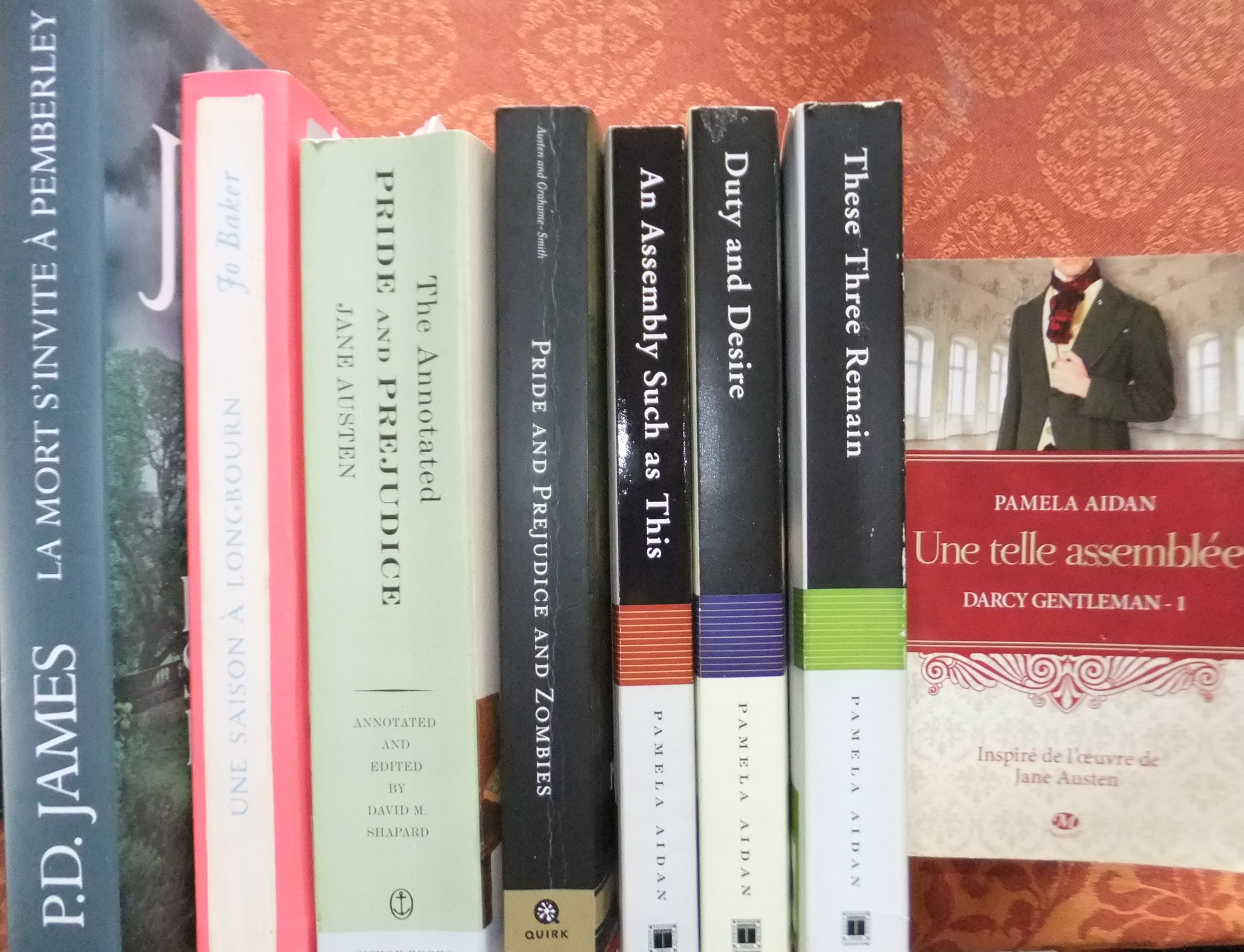
A collection of parallel or derivative works based on Pride and Prejudice

A parallel novel is an in-universe (but often non-canonical) pastiche (or sometimes sequel) piece of literature written within, derived from, or taking place during the framework of another work of fiction by the same or another author with respect to continuity.

Parallel novels or "reimagined classics" are works of fiction that "borrow a character and fill in his story, mirror an 'old' plot, or blend the characters of one book with those of another". These stories further the works of already well-known novels by focusing on a minor character and making them the major character. The revised stories may have the same setting and time frame and even the same characters.

Creating parallel novels can have significant legal implications when the copyright of the original author's work has not expired, and a later author makes a parallel novel derived from the original author's work.

== Examples ==
- Wide Sargasso Sea (1966) by Jean Rhys parallels Jane Eyre from the perspective of Bertha Mason, reimagining her as a Creole woman named Antoinette Cosway.
- Wild Wood (1981) by Jan Needle parallels The Wind in the Willows from the perspective of the stoats and weasels.
- Wicked (1995) by Gregory Maguire parallels The Wonderful Wizard of Oz as a revisionist biography of the Wicked Witch of the West, challenging preconceived notions about the nature of good and evil.
- The Last Ringbearer (1999) by Kirill Eskov parallels The Lord of the Rings with the Mordorians as the heroes.
- The Wind Done Gone (2001) by Alice Randall parallels Gone with the Wind.
- March (2005) by Geraldine Brooks parallels Little Women (1868).
- Longbourn (2013) by Jo Baker parallels Pride and Prejudice.
- Julia (2023) by Sandra Newman parallels Nineteen Eighty-Four by George Orwell from the perspective of Julia.
- James (2024) by Percival Everett parallels Adventures of Huckleberry Finn by Mark Twain from the perspective of Jim.

== See also ==
- Authors' rights – Right to exploit a creative work
- Continuation novel – Authorized sequel by a different author
- Copyright protection for fictional characters
- Crossover (fiction) – Sometimes canonical mixing of characters or worlds from originally separate fictional universes
  - Intercompany crossovers in comics
- Expanded universe – Non-linear additions with consistency to the fictional universe
- Fan fiction – Type of fiction created by fans of the original subject
- Frame story – Story in a nested narration that brackets one or more embedded stories
- Klinger v. Conan Doyle Estate, Ltd.
- Mashup novel – Non-canonical mixing of texts in new genres without continuity often in parody
- Metafiction – Genre of fiction about fiction
- Nichols v. Universal Pictures Corp.
- Retcon – Revision of existing facts in succeeding works of fiction
- Retelling – Process of telling a story again, often tweaking or recontextualising it
- Revisionism (fictional) – Works of fiction revised and retold
- Spinoff (media) – Narrative work derived from existing works
