= Literary estate =

Deceased author's copyright and intellectual property

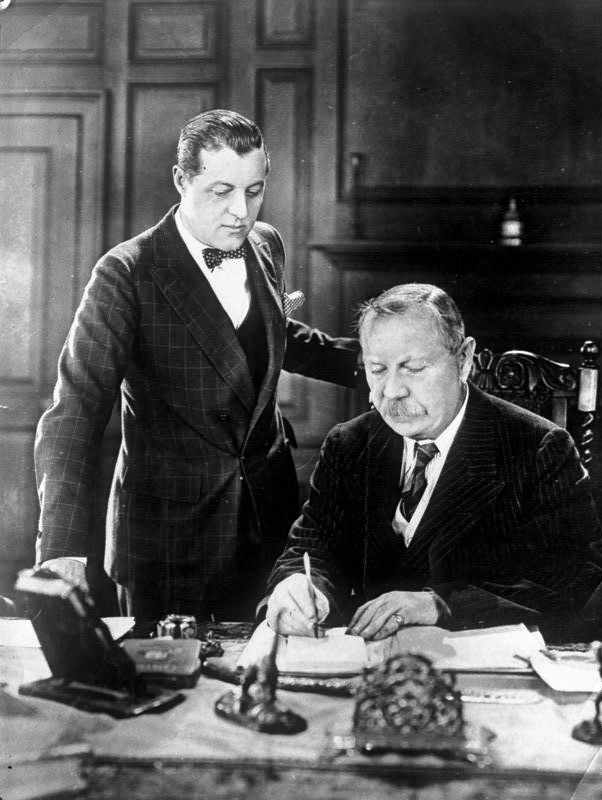
Adrian Conan Doyle (left) son and from 1940, executor of the literary estate of Arthur Conan Doyle (right)

The literary estate of a deceased author consists mainly of the copyright and other intellectual property rights of published works, including film, translation rights, original manuscripts of published work, unpublished or partially completed work, and papers of intrinsic literary interest such as correspondence or personal diaries and records. In academia, the German term Nachlass for the legacy of papers is often used.

== Literary executor ==
A literary executor is a person acting on behalf of beneficiaries (e.g. family members, a designated charity, a research library or archive) under a deceased author's will. The executor is responsible for entering into contracts with publishers, collecting royalties, maintaining copyrights, and (where appropriate) arranging for the deposit of letters. According to Wills, Administration and Taxation: a practical guide (1990, UK) "A will may appoint different executors to deal with different parts of the estate. One example of this is the appointment of a literary executor to deal with literary effects [...]".

Since the literary estate is a legacy to the author's heirs, the management of it in financial terms is a responsibility of trust. The position of literary executor extends beyond the monetary aspect, though: appointment to such a position, perhaps informally, is often a matter of the author's choice during his or her lifetime.

If a sympathetic and understanding friend is in the position of literary executor, there can be conflict: what is to be managed is not just a portfolio of intellectual property but a posthumous reputation. Wishes of the deceased author may have been clearly expressed but are not always respected. Family members often express strong feelings about privacy of the dead. For example, biographical writing is likely to be of a quite different authority if it is carried out with access to private papers. The literary executor then becomes a gatekeeper.

=== Examples ===
Examples of literary executors include Sir Edward Marsh for Rupert Brooke, Robert Baldwin Ross for Oscar Wilde, Robert Hayward Barlow for H. P. Lovecraft, Rush Rhees, G. H. von Wright and G. E. M. Anscombe for Ludwig Wittgenstein, Otto Nathan for Albert Einstein, Regine Olsen for Søren Kierkegaard and Paul Williams for Philip K. Dick.

A particularly notorious example is Elisabeth Förster-Nietzsche for Friedrich Nietzsche, as she resorted to fraud to make her brother's Nachlass more compatible with Nazi ideology. An exceptionally productive example is that of Rudolf Steiner. Although he did not originally intend that the stenographs of his thousands of lectures be published, he relented and named his second wife, Marie Steiner-von Sivers, to direct his Nachlass, which has produced more than three hundred volumes since his death in 1925.

Older examples of such appointments, such as Kenelm Digby for Ben Jonson, are essentially editorial rather than legal. A contemporary case is Christopher Tolkien's work on J. R. R. Tolkien's papers.

A notable example is the case of Franz Kafka, who left no will. His friend Max Brod assumed the function of literary executor, though most of the literary estate was legally owned by Marianne Steiner and Věra Saudková.

== See also ==
- Association Littéraire et Artistique Internationale
- Authors' rights
- Backlist
- Copyright protection for fictional characters
- Digital inheritance
- Edgar Rice Burroughs, Inc.
- Klinger v. Conan Doyle Estate, Ltd.
- Protection of Classics – Provision of copyright law in Nordic countries
- Société Plon et autres v. Pierre Hugo et autres
- Suntrust Bank v. Houghton Mifflin Co.
