= Alai =

Alai or ALAI may refer to:

- Alai (Cilicia), town of ancient Cilicia
- Alai (film), a 2003 Indian Tamil film starring Silambarasan
- Alai, Iran, a village in Hormozgan Province, Iran
- Alai (Enderverse), a character from Orson Scott Card's Ender's Game series
- Alai (name), list of people with the name
- Association Littéraire et Artistique Internationale ("International Literary and Artistic Association"), an international organization devoted to promotion of authors’ rights

== See also ==
- Alay (disambiguation)
