= Alai (name) =

Alai is a surname and a masculine given name. Notable people with the name are as follows:

== Surname ==
- Cyrus Alai, Persian-British engineer
- Robert Alai, Kenyan blogger and cyber-activist
- Shamseddin Amir-Alai (1900–1994), Iranian politician

== Given name ==
- Alai (author), ethnic Tibetan Chinese author, author of Red Poppies
- Alai Ghasem (born 2003), Iraqi football player
- Alai Kalaniuvalu (born 1971), American football player

== See also ==
- Alay
