= Alay (disambiguation) =

Alay is an Indonesian pop culture phenomenon.

Alay may also refer to:

- Alay District, Osh Region, south-western Kyrgyzstan
- Alay Range, mountain range in Kyrgyzstan and Tajikistan
- Alay Valley, southern Osh Region, Kyrgyzstan
- Alay, Niğde, a town in the central district (Niğde) of Niğde Province, Turkey

== People ==
- Alay Soler (born 1979), American baseball pitcher
- Josep Lluís Alay (born 1966), Spanish professor of Asian history
- Sergey Alay (born 1965), Belarusian hammer thrower

== Other ==
- FC Alay, Kyrgyzstani football club

== See also ==
- Alai (disambiguation)
- Alaya (disambiguation)
