= Authors' rights =

Right to exploit a creative work

"Authors' rights" is a term frequently used in connection with laws about intellectual property.

The term is considered as a direct translation of the French term droit d'auteur (also German Urheberrecht). It was first (1777) promoted in France by Pierre-Augustin Caron de Beaumarchais, who had close relations with Benjamin Franklin. It is generally used in relation to the copyright laws of civil law countries and in European Union law. Authors' rights are internationally protected by the Berne Convention for the Protection of Literary and Artistic Works and by other similar treaties. "Author" is used in a very wide sense, and includes composers, artists, sculptors and even architects: in general, the author is the person whose creativity led to the protected work being created, although the exact definition varies from country to country.

Authors' rights have two distinct components: the economic rights in the work and the moral rights of the author. The economic rights are a property right which is limited in time and which may be transferred by the author to other people in the same way as any other property (although many countries require that the transfer must be in the form of a written contract). They are intended to allow the author or their holder to profit financially from their creation, and include the right to authorize the reproduction of the work in any form (Article 9, Berne Convention). The authors of dramatic works (plays, etc.) also have the right to authorize the public performance of their works (Article 11, Berne Convention).

The protection of the moral rights of an author is based on the view that a creative work is in some way an expression of the author's personality: the moral rights are therefore personal to the author and cannot be transferred to another person except by testament when the author dies. The moral rights regime differs greatly between countries, but typically includes the right to be identified as the author of the work and the right to object to any distortion or mutilation of the work which would be prejudicial to the author's honor or reputation (Article 6bis, Berne Convention). In many countries, the moral rights of an author are perpetual.

== Distinction between common law copyright and civil law authors' rights ==
It is common to draw a distinction in the treatment of authors and other interested parties between common law jurisdictions and civil law systems. Both copyright and authors' rights arose in the eighteenth century to address similar problems: the inequality in relations between authors and publishers (and between publishers themselves) if intellectual property is not recognized and protected, and the need to provide an income for authors other than patronage. Both systems provide for a monopoly right granted to the author for a limited term which can be transferred to another person, which was initially the right to copy or otherwise reproduce the work (hence "copyright") but has since been expanded to take account of technological developments.

It is an essential feature of authors' rights and of many copyright laws that the object which is protected must arise from the creativity of the author rather than from their simple effort or investment (see Feist v. Rural in the United States): both French and German copyright laws protect "works of the mind" (oeuvres de l'esprit and persönliche geistige Schöpfungen, respectively). This has led civil law systems to adopt a strong link between the rights (at least initially) and the person of the author: the initial ownership rights by a corporation are severely restricted or even impossible (as in Germany). Common law jurisdictions are more willing to accept corporate ownership of copyright, as in the U. S. work for hire principle. Although the following comparison is simplistic and dependent on the exact laws of individual countries, it is difficult to see an effective (economic) difference in the two situations:

- Common law: employer owns the copyright in work created by employees
- Civil law: employer enjoys an exclusive licence to the economic rights in work created by employees

Civil law systems have also been forceful in protecting the moral rights of authors, arguing that their creativity deserves protection as an integral part of their personality. The protection of the personality in common law jurisdiction has for long been separate from the law of copyright, embodied in such torts as defamation (also passing off and malicious falsehood). Moral rights were not, therefore, explicitly mentioned in UK copyright law until 1988, over a century after the United Kingdom signed the Berne Convention. The difference runs both ways: UK and Irish copyright laws protect the privacy of the subject of certain photographs and films as a moral right under copyright law, while civil law systems treat this as a separate portrait right. The different protections of industrial design rights cut across the divide between the two systems of law.

== Use in European Union law ==
The term "authors' rights" is used in European Union law to avoid ambiguity, in preference to the more usual translation of droit d'auteur etc. as "copyright". The equivalent term in British and Irish law is "copyright (subsisting) in a literary, dramatic, musical or artistic work"; the term in Maltese and Cypriot law is similar, except that dramatic works are treated as a subset of literary works.

=== Germany ===
Under a bill proposed by the government of Chancellor Angela Merkel approved by the Bundestag, Germany infringement of copyright is equivalent to the crime of theft. The prison sentences for violations of copyright, exactly equal to those provided for the theft, are five years in prison and are the strictest in Europe. Even children under 18 years may be indicted for the offence. In addition, following the judgment of 20 October 1993 on the case Phil Collins, it was launched Article 12 (in the Treaty establishing the European Community), according to which states cannot discriminate against goods from other countries.

=== France ===
Since October 2009, as required under the Creation and Internet law n. 311, High Authority for the dissemination of works and protection of rights on the Internet (HADOPI) may order the ISP (Internet Service Provider), following a process of investigation and a series of warnings, to temporarily or permanently suspend the 'internet access to those who are caught downloading material illegally.

=== Italy ===
The Italian copyright law is governed primarily by Law 22 April 1941 n. 633, on "Protection of copyright and other rights associated with its exercise," and Article 2575 and following of the Civil Code (Book Five - Title IX: Of Intellectual property rights and on industrial inventions). Article 54 L.218 / 95 states as the proprietary rights are regulated by state law to use, although the advent of the internet complicate the identification of the place where the activity was carried out.

== Related (or neighbouring) rights ==
Related rights (in German verwandte Schutzrechte), often referred to as neighbouring rights as a more direct translation of the French Droit Voisins, are property rights granted to people who are not the "author" of the work in the creative sense of the term. Typically these include performers, producers of phonograms (records, CDs, etc.), producers of films (as opposed to directors or scriptwriters) and broadcasting organisations. Related rights are generally more restricted than authors' rights in civil law countries, although they may be equivalent in common law countries where both fall under the same concept of "copyright". They are not directly covered by the Berne Convention, but are internationally protected by other treaties such as the Rome Convention for the Protection of Performers, Producers of Phonograms and Broadcasting Organisations.

== See also ==
- Association Littéraire et Artistique Internationale – International writers' organization (1878-)
- Continuation novel – Canonical sequel novel by a different author
- Copyright protection for fictional characters
- Japanese Society for Rights of Authors, Composers and Publishers
- Protection of Classics – Provision of copyright law in Nordic countries
- Sequel – Continuation of a previous work
- Société Plon et autres v. Pierre Hugo et autres – French Court case on authors' rights and public domain
- WALTIC (Writers' and Literary Translators' International Congress)
- AuthorShare
