= Klinger v. Conan Doyle Estate, Ltd. =

United States Court case on copyright in fictional characters

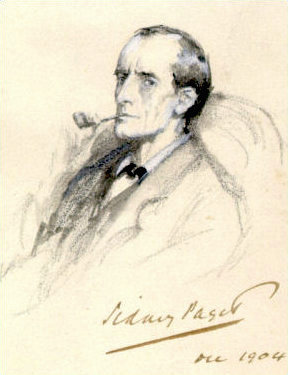
Public domain depiction of the character Sherlock Holmes, drawn by Sidney Paget, and part of the subject of the case

Klinger v. Conan Doyle Estate, Ltd. was a 2014 decision by the U.S. Court of Appeals for the Seventh Circuit (755 F.3d 496), in response to an appeal filed by the defendants against the 2013 ruling of the U.S. District Court for Northern district of Illinois (988 F. Supp. 2d 879). These decisions, by the District Court and the Court of the Seventh Circuit, clarified the validity (under copyright law) of the use of characters of Sherlock Holmes and his colleague Dr. John Watson, and the story elements, in unlicensed works. Further, the overall scope of using characters in the public domain was also clarified.

The courts held that the characters of Holmes and Watson had entered the public domain along with the story elements of the works on which the copyright protection had expired, i.e., published prior to 1923; hence, they can be used in subsequent works without procuring a license. However, the copyright protection in works published in and after 1923 was still valid, and the unique expressions found in those works could still not be used without the permission of the Defendants until the works' copyrights expire.

== Background ==
Sir Arthur Conan Doyle authored four novels and fifty-six short stories featuring Holmes and Watson (sometimes referred to as "the Canon"), published between 1887 and 1927. The Conan Doyle Estate is a company owned by certain collateral descendants of Conan Doyle and others, which claims ownership of certain intellectual property rights to Conan Doyle's works and grants licenses to use these rights.

By 2013, 50 of the 60 canonical stories were in the public domain in the United States because their copyrights had expired. The remaining ten stories, first published in magazines and later published in book form in The Case-Book of Sherlock Holmes, remained under copyright in the United States under the "Copyright Term Extension Act of 1998", which extended the copyright term for certain works published in and after 1923 to 95 years from their original publication date. The copyrights on these ten stories expired from 2019 to 2023 on the first day of the year, dubbed Public Domain Day. As of January 1, 2023, all canonical Sherlock Holmes works are in the public domain in the U.S.

Leslie S. Klinger co-edited an anthology of original Sherlock Holmes pastiches, titled A Study in Sherlock, which was published in 2011 by Random House. The stories in A Study in Sherlock were inspired by the Sherlock Holmes canon and included canonical characters and elements. Before the anthology was published, the Conan Doyle Estate asserted to Random House that the Estate had exclusive rights to use the characters of Holmes and Watson, and if Random House intended to publish the anthology, it needed to enter into a licensing agreement with the Estate. Random House signed a licensing agreement with the Estate before publishing the anthology.

Klinger then co-edited a sequel to A Study in Sherlock, a second anthology titled In the Company of Sherlock Holmes. This book was also a compilation of short stories inspired and influenced by the Sherlock Holmes canon. This book was to be published by Pegasus Books and distributed by W.W. Norton & Company. When the Estate learned of this book's impending publication, it contacted Pegasus Books, asserting that if Pegasus intended to publish the work legally, it needed to obtain a license from the Estate. The Estate wrote, "[I]f you proceed instead to bring out [the book] unlicensed, do not expect to see it offered for sale by Amazon, Barnes & Noble, and similar retailers. We work with those compan[ies] routinely to weed out unlicensed uses of Sherlock Holmes from their offerings, and will not hesitate to do so with your book as well."

Klinger believed that he did not need to obtain and pay for a license from the Estate, because the characters of Holmes and Watson had already entered the public domain and hence could be freely used. However, Pegasus Books was concerned about the communication it had received from the Estate and did not finalize its contract to publish the book. To address the issue, Klinger filed a copyright lawsuit in the United States District Court for the Northern District of Illinois, sitting in Chicago, against the Conan Doyle Estate. The lawsuit sought declaratory judgement under the Declaratory Judgement Act, 28 U.S.C.S. § 2201, determining that Klinger could legally publish In the Company of Sherlock Holmes without paying the Estate for a license.

== District Court decision (2013) ==
The district court allowed the plaintiff to file for a summary motion due to the absence of defendant in the initial proceedings. The standard, as the Court noted, under Federal Rule of Civil Procedure no. 56 () for granting summary motion is that, "[t]he court shall grant summary judgment if the movant shows that there is no genuine dispute as to any material fact and the movant is entitled to judgment as a matter of Law."

The plaintiff sought a declaratory judgement that the characters of Holmes and Watson had entered the public domain and hence could be used by the plaintiff and that he was further allowed to use the any expressions depicted in first fifty works.

The district court, on the action brought by the plaintiff had two headings to decide upon:

1. Whether it had the jurisdiction to pass a declaratory judgement, and;
2. Whether on the merits of the case Klinger was allowed by the law to use the characters of Holmes and Watson and the story elements, both for pre-1923 works, and post-1923 works (the ten stories still copyrighted at the time).

The district court granted, in part, and denied, in part, the plaintiff's motion for summary judgement.

=== Jurisdiction ===
The Estate asserted that the District Court lacked jurisdiction over the case because there was no "actual controversy" between the parties, as required before the Court may issue a declaratory judgment, because the Estate had not threatened litigation against Klinger. Klinger disagreed, asserting that a direct threat of litigation was not the sole means by which an actual controversy could be created. Here, Klinger asserted, the Estate's assertions that publishing the book without a license would be unlawful and its threat to deter online retailers from distributing the book by using the Digital Millennium Copyright Act, were sufficient to give rise to an actual controversy.

District Judge Ruben Castillo observed that the actual controversy requirement under the Declaratory Judgment Act resembled the requirements of the Case or Controversy Clause in Article III of the U.S. Constitution. He observed that in MedImmune, Inc. v. Genentech, Inc., the Court had held that a threat of litigation was not essential for a case or controversy under Article III. Rather, the Court explained, the test was "whether the facts alleged, under all the circumstances, show that there is a substantial controversy, between parties having adverse legal interests, of sufficient immediacy and reality to warrant the issuance of a declaratory judgment."

Here, exercising the "unique and substantial discretion" accorded to the Courts under the Declaratory Judgment Act, Judge Castillo found that a "substantial controversy" existed between the parties, that the parties had clear "adverse legal interests," and that publication of the book was dependent on the Court's potential ruling. Thus, the dispute had "sufficient immediacy and reality" for the Court to exercise jurisdiction.

=== Merits ===
- Pre-1923: The Court stated that for pre-1923 works, Klinger need not obtain any license, since they already had entered the public domain. Citing Silverman v. CBC, Inc., where some of the radio scripts had entered the public domain while some others were still protected, the plaintiff was allowed to use public domain material without any license. The estate, however, argued that the characters of Holmes and Watson continued to get developed through the complete canon, including in the ten stories, and therefore should remain under copyright protection until the final work enters the public domain. The Court, again using the Silverman case as a reference point, ruled that only the "increments of expression" of the ten stories—i.e., the ways in which these stories further delineated the characters—are protected. The defendant also argued that the reference taken from Silverman should only be limited to flat characters and not complex characters such as Holmes and Watson. However, the Court held that the argument made by the Estate is without any legal basis and further observed that "the copyrightable aspects of a character ... are protected only to the extent the work in which that particular aspect of the character was first delineated remains protected." The Court held that if the argument offered by the defendant is held to be the law, it would essentially mean into extension of the statutory duration of protection and that would be against the objectives of the Copyright Act.
- Post-1923: Klinger argued that even the elements present in ten stories should not be protected, since they do not complete the characters, and those elements are events rather than the characteristics of Holmes and Watson. Justice Castillo, rejecting the argument, held that the test is not whether elements complete the characters, but that of "increment in expression". To the extent that an author of a derivative work contributes to the increment of expression, copyright protection is to be granted to the underlying work. The estate argued that Sir Arthur Conan Doyle developed the characters throughout the canon and therefore, no single work is a derivative work of another. Court rejected this interpretation. 17 U.S.C. § 101, defines derivative works as "a work based upon one or more preexisting works, such as a translation, musical arrangement, dramatization, fictionalization, motion picture version, sound recording, art reproduction, abridgement, condensation, or any other form in which a work may be recast, transformed, or adapted. A work consisting of editorial revisions, annotations, elaborations, or other modifications which, as a whole, represent an original work of authorship, is a 'derivative work.'" Interpreting and adopting the definition, the Court held that the ten stories are indeed derivative works of the earlier works, but that this does not affect their copyright protection, since they satisfy the "increment in expression" test.

== Court of Appeals decision (2014) ==
Dissatisfied with the decision of the district court, the Estate filed an appeal to the Court of the Seventh Circuit.

The Appeal court had two counts to decide upon:

1. Whether the District court had a valid jurisdiction to pass a ruling in the case, and;
2. Whether the ruling by the district court with respect to the use of characters of Holmes and Watson and story elements was correct under the law.

=== Jurisdiction ===
Article III of the Constitution limits the jurisdiction of federal courts to cases or controversies. Thus, only when there is an "actual dispute", a federal court should exercise its jurisdiction. That requirement, the appeal court held, was fulfilled:

Had Klinger had no idea how the Doyle estate would react to the publication of In the Company of Sherlock Holmes, he could not have sought a declaratory judgment, because he would not have been able to demonstrate that there was an actual dispute. He could seek advice, but not from a federal judge. But the Doyle estate had made clear that if Klinger succeeded in getting his book published the estate would try to prevent it from being sold by asking Amazon and the other big book retailers not to carry it, implicitly threatening to sue the publisher, as well as Klinger and his co-editor, for copyright infringement if they defied its threat. The twin threats—to block the distribution of the book by major retailers and to sue for copyright infringement—created an actual rather than merely a potential controversy.

Justice Richard Posner noted, "Only if Klinger obtains the declaration will he be able to publish his book without having to yield to what he considers extortion."

The Court held that, had Klinger published the sequel without seeking the declaratory order, he would have faced a copyright infringement suit from the Estate. Further, it was held that the action brought by the plaintiff was purely a matter of law, i.e., whether he can use the character of Holmes and Watson, and elements in public domain, and accordingly the Judge in the Federal Court was right to assert jurisdiction over the case.

The Court also noted that for post-1923 works, the plaintiff did not intend to seek a declaratory judgement, since he acknowledged that the copyrights in the ten stories were valid, and the district court only discussed them due to certain exhibits being mislabeled. Accordingly, the Appeal court held that the summary judgement ruling for the last ten stories can be ignored.

=== Validity of copyright protection ===
The Estate contended that the character cannot be lawfully used without a license until the copyright of the later works—in which the characters of Holmes and Watson were further developed—expires. The Court ruled that this assertion lacked any basis under the law or the copyright statute. Reiterating the decision in Silverman, Justice Posner noted that copyright subsists in only the original work of authorship, and afterwards, only to the extent of increment in expression in the subsequent/derivative works. Upholding the district court's ruling, the Court noted that the ten stories are derivative works, inspired from earlier stories, and hence only the original elements in the ten stories remain protected.

The Estate contended that there is a distinction between "flat" and "round" characters, and that the ruling of the district court, along with the cited precedents, should be limited to flat characters. Since the ten copyrighted stories made the characters of Sherlock Holmes and John Watson more "rounded", the Estate argued that the characters warranted copyright protection. The Court rejected this argument, holding that the difference between flat and round characters was irrelevant to the law.

Finally, the Court held that, in the initial works of Sir Arthur Conan Doyle, the characters of Holmes and Watson were sufficiently delineated as to become eligible and subject to copyright protection. Any subsequent alteration to these characters made in the ten stories, even though independently original and subject to protection, does not "revive the expired copyrights on the original characters." The Court, rejecting the appeal of the defendants, argued that the Estate essentially asked for 135 years of copyright protection over the characters of Holmes and Watson, which was contradictory to the goals of the statute and hence not permissible under the law.

== Supreme Court proceedings ==
Dissatisfied with the Seventh Circuit's decision, the Estate requested an emergency stay from the Circuit Justice for the Seventh Circuit, Justice Elena Kagan, who denied the application. The Estate then filed a petition for a writ of certiorari, which was also denied, leaving the Seventh Circuit's opinion as the final judgment in the case.

== Implications ==
The ruling in Klinger v. Conan Doyle Estate Ltd. allows authors of derivative works to use characters and expressions in works which have entered into public domain. Thus, a character which has been modified in subsequent works does not get a perpetual copyright. The copyright protection in subsequent works is limited to the original contributions, which the Court identifies as "increment of expression", and does not extend the copyright protection of characters or expressions that appeared in the original work.

Further, although public domain works and their elements can be used in subsequent or derivative works, such derivative works still have to meet the conditions of originality (Feist) in order to get their own copyright protection. As the Seventh Circuit Court noted in Schrock v. Learning Curve International, Inc., "[T]he only originality required for a new work to be copyrightable is enough expressive variation from public-domain or other existing works to enable the new work to be readily distinguished from its predecessors."

== See also ==
- Copyright protection for fictional characters
- Continuation novel
- Jean Conan Doyle
- Literary estate
- Nichols v. Universal Pictures Corp.
- Société Plon et autres v. Pierre Hugo et autres
- Solar Pons
- Suntrust Bank v. Houghton Mifflin Co.
