= Alaya (disambiguation) =

Alaya a type of consciousness in Mahayana Buddhism

Alaya may also refer to:

- Gugu Thaypan language of Australia
- Alaya (film), a 1987 US film
- Alaya F (born 1997), an Indian actress

== See also ==
- Aaliyah (disambiguation)
- Alay (disambiguation)
- Aliyah (disambiguation)
