= Protection of Classics =

Provision of copyright law in Nordic countries

Protection of Classics is a provision of intellectual property law that is included in the Copyright Acts of the Nordic countries. According to this stipulation, it is forbidden to treat a work of art in a manner which violates cultural interests after the death of the author. This concerns also cases in which the copyright is no longer in force or has never existed, that is, material in the public domain.

The Copyright Acts of the Nordic countries resemble each other because important legislation used to be drafted jointly in these countries and that applied also to the copyright act preparation during the 1930s–1950s.

In most Nordic countries, there have been cases in which the prohibition has been imposed. Several cases exist in Norway, two in Denmark, and one in Finland. For instance in Denmark, it was ruled that also the Gospels are protected by this paragraph of the Copyright Act. In Finland, several translated children's books (including Alice's Adventures in Wonderland) were banned in May 1962 because of the poor quality and clandestine abridgement of the translations. After appeals, the Supreme Court of Finland upheld the prohibition issued by the Finnish Ministry of Education.

== See also ==
- Authors' rights
- Literary estate
- Legal issues with fan fiction
