= DC Comics v. Mark Towle =

2015 copyright legal case in the USA

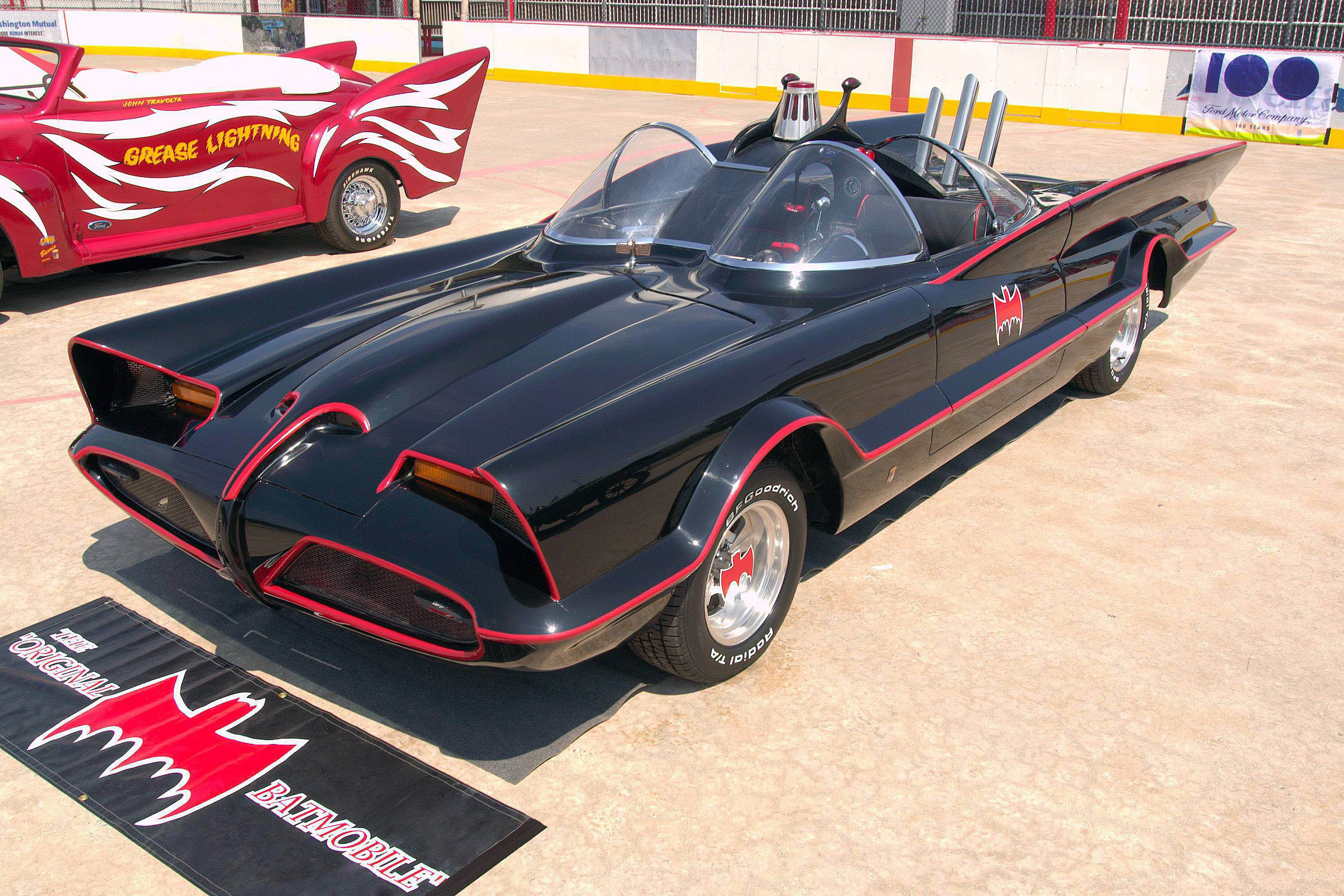
1960s Batmobile similar to the one in this case

DC Comics v. Mark Towle was a copyright case heard in the United States Court of Appeals for the Ninth Circuit in September 2015. The case concerned defendant Mark Towle, who built and sold replicas of the Batmobile in his garage named Gotham Garage. DC Comics initially filed a lawsuit, in May 2011, in the federal district court alleging causes of action for copyright infringement, trademark infringement and unfair competition arising out of Mark's manufacture and sale of replicas. The plaintiffs, DC Comics, claimed the infringement of their copyright as the replicas sold by Mark were similar to the ones that appeared in 1966 television show Batman and the 1989 film Batman. The issue discussed by the court was "whether a character in a comic book, television program or motion picture is entitled to copyright protection". The Ninth Circuit followed the precedents and came up with a three-part test to determine the protection given to such characters.

The three-part test to determine the copyright protection for a comic character, sometimes referred to as the Towle test, is as follows:

1. "The character must generally have physical as well as conceptual qualities.
2. The character must be sufficiently delineated to be recognizable as the same character whenever it appears. It must display consistent, identifiable character traits and attributes, although the character need not have a consistent appearance.
3. The character must be especially distinctive and contain some unique elements of expression. It cannot be a stock character like a magician in standard magician garb."

The court applied this test to the Batmobile to conclude that the character is the property of DC Comics and is entitled to copyright protection. The defendant, thus, had infringed upon the plaintiff's copyright. While concluding so, the Ninth Circuit court affirmed the judgement of the federal district court.

== Background ==
=== Plaintiffs ===
DC comics is an American comic book publisher and owner of the comic books featuring the story of Batman. It is also one of the oldest and largest American comic book companies. The character in question, the Batmobile, is a fictional, high-tech automobile which is the primary mode of transportation for Batman. It possesses Bat like external features and is equipped with futuristic weaponry and crime fighting technology. Since the creation of the character it has appeared multiple times in various comic books, television series or motion pictures. As pointed out by the court, two depictions of the Batmobile were relevant for the case: those in the 1966 television series starring Adam West, and the 1989 motion picture starring Michael Keaton.

=== Defendant ===
Mark Towle is the owner of Gotham Garage where he produced replicas of the aforementioned Batmobile versions. The court noted that Mark conceded the fact that the replicas copy the designs of such versions, though they do not copy every feature. Various car collectors were buying these replicas for a price of approximately $90,000. Before a lawsuit was filed by DC Comics, Mark had advertised these replicas as "Batmobiles" and used the domain name batmobilereplicas.com. Mark himself admitted that he was not authorized by the plaintiffs to manufacture such replicas. He also sold kits which the customers could use to modify their cars to look like the Batmobile.

Hence, a lawsuit was filed by DC Comics in the federal district court claiming infringement of their copyright and trademark protection and causing unfair competition arising out of the replicas being sold on the market.

== Federal District Court's ruling ==
The district court granted in part and denied in part DC Comics' motion for summary judgement while denying the cross motion for summary judgement filed by Towle. The rulings of the district court were as follows:

1. The Batmobile was a character entitled to copyright protection—it is known by one consistent name which identifies it as Batman's personal vehicle. Further, several physical traits of the Batmobile have remained consistent over time and it has always been depicted as "swift, cunning, strong, and elusive".
2. DC Comics was the owner of the merchandising rights of Batman and hence, had maintained the copyright protection of the Batmobile.
3. Towle had infringed upon DC's copyright because he made replicas of the Batmobile as it appeared in the 1966 television series and 1989 motion picture.

Further, the court also held that Towle had acted in bad faith and had intentionally copied DC's trademark so as to associate his products with the productions.

== Court of Appeals, Ninth Circuit's reasoning ==
To determine the copyrightability of the Batmobile, the court applied the aforementioned framework of the three-part test and affirmed the findings of the district court. The analysis of the court was as follows:

1. The court noted that the Batmobile is not simply a literary character but rather one which has "physical as well as conceptual qualities". It has appeared graphically in comic books and as a 3-dimensional figure in motion pictures and television series.
2. As the Batmobile has maintained its "physical and conceptual qualities" since its first appearance, it can be concluded that it is "sufficiently delineated" to be recognizable as the same character wherever it appears. Its colour, bat-themed shape and crime fighting technology has remained consistent throughout various appearances. Like in the comic books, the Batmobile as portrayed in the 1966 television series and 1989 motion pictures share similar attributes and character traits even though the appearance seems to be different.
3. The third prong of the test requires the character to be especially distinctive and contain some unique elements of expression. The Batmobile has been portrayed consistently as Batman's side-kick with unique character traits and attributes. It is also known by its highly recognizable name throughout the comic books, television series and motion pictures. Hence the court was satisfied that the third prong of the test was met as the Batmobile is not merely a stock character.

After being satisfied that the character in question was copyrightable by DC Comics, the court analysed whether replicas manufactured by Mark Towle infringed upon DC's copyright protection. Mark did not contest the fact that he manufactured "replicas" of the Batmobile as it appeared in the aforementioned series and motion pictures. The court denied the main argument of the defendant that "DC does not own any copyright interest" in the Batmobile; DC transferred its right to produce derivative works under the 1965 agreement with American Broadcasting Company (ABC) and later under the 1979 agreement with Batman Productions, Inc. (BPI). However, while doing so, it did not transfer the ownership of the character. Hence, the copyright protection still lies with DC comics.

Lastly, as the copying of the character was admitted by Mark, the court did not apply the "substantial similarity" test to determine infringement.

== Conclusion ==
The United States Court of Appeals, Ninth Circuit concluded that DC Comics owns the copyright to the "Batmobile" character as it appeared in 1966 television series and the 1989 motion picture and that Towle had infringed upon this copyright by manufacturing replicas of the character. Thus the Ninth Circuit affirmed the decision of the federal district court.

This ruling of the Ninth Circuit expanded the application of copyright law by prescribing requirements for comic-book characters to be protected.

== See also ==
- Copyright protection for fictional characters
