= Cyrus Alai =

Persian-British engineer

- Education: Technische Universität Berlin
- Occupation: Persian-British engineer

Cyrus Alai (Persian: سیروس علایی) is a Persian-British engineer, map collector and the author of the book "General Maps of Persia".

Alai was born in Tehran and studied at Technische Universität Berlin. Before the 1979 revolution he was a lecturer at Tehran University. Shortly after the revolution he moved to London.

Alai has contributed to various publications such as the Encyclopedia Iranica for the entries related to cartography of Persia.

He is the author of two books "General Maps of Persia" and "Special Maps of Persia" which have been published by Brill Publications in the Netherlands in 2006 and 2009. He donated his huge collection of Persian maps to the University of London.

== Sources ==
- General Maps of Persia 1477–1925 (Brill)
- Cyrus Alai served for nine years as the honorary treasurer of the International Map Collectors' Society
