= Anderson v. Stallone =

Copyright infringement lawsuit

- Court: United States District Court for the Central District of California
- Full case name: Timothy Burton Anderson v. Sylvester Stallone, Freddie Fields, Dean Stolber, Frank Yablans, and MGM/UA
- Decided: April 25, 1989
- Docket nos.: 87-0592
- Citations: 11 U.S.P.Q.2d 1161; Copy. L. Rep. (CCH) ¶ 22,665, 1989 WL 206431, 1989 U.S. Dist. LEXIS 11109

Court membership
- Judge sitting: William D. Keller

Keywords
- Copyright infringement

Anderson v. Stallone, 11 U.S.P.Q.2d 1161 (C.D. Cal. 1989) was a copyright infringement lawsuit against Sylvester Stallone, MGM, and other parties over a script for Stallone's film Rocky IV. This script written by Timothy Anderson was unsolicited and unauthorized, a key fact that led to a decision in favor of the defendants in the lower court and was later resolved in an out-of-court settlement during the pendency of plaintiff's appeal.

== Introduction ==
Timothy Burton Anderson, an author who wrote a script for the film Rocky IV, brought the suit for copyright infringement, unfair competition, unjust enrichment, and breach of confidence against Stallone, MGM, and other parties. Stallone et al. filed a motion for summary judgment which was granted in part and denied in part. Anderson appealed. The case was thereafter resolved in a confidential out-of-court settlement.

== Case background ==
In June 1982, after viewing the movie Rocky III, Anderson wrote a treatment for Rocky IV. According to Anderson's complaint filed with the court, in October 1982, Anderson met with Art Linkletter, a member of MGM's Board of Directors, at his Bel Air home; with Freddy Fields, then-president of MGM/UA at his Culver City office; and also had meetings during the Summer of 1983 with then-Board Chairman Frank Yablans and MGM/UA Vice President Peter Bart. During the meetings, they discussed using Anderson's script for Rocky IV. Anderson claimed that MGM told him that if they used his script he would be paid a large sum of money. Anderson also met with Stallone in May 1983 at Stallone's Paramount Pictures office in a meeting arranged and attended by then-Deputy White House Chief of Staff Michael Deaver.

The case was argued before District Judge William D. Keller of the Central District of California. The Court concluded that the Defendants are entitled to their motion for summary judgment because Anderson's script is an infringing work not entitled to copyright protection.

The Court determined that the characters from the original movies were afforded copyright protection, using a standard borrowed from Judge Learned Hand in Nichols v. Universal Pictures Corp.. The key to the standard is that copyright protection is afforded when a character is developed with enough specificity to constitute protectable expression.

It was strikingly clear to the Court that Anderson's work was a derivative work; that under 17 U.S.C. section 106(2) derivative works are the exclusive privilege of the copyright holder (Stallone, in this case); and that since Anderson's work is unauthorized, no part of it can be given protection. Anderson attempted to argue that Congressional history of 17 U.S.C. section 103(a) indicates that Congress intended non-infringing portions of derivative works to be protected. The Court disagreed, citing legal scholarship (copyright law professors Melville and David Nimmer) and case law interpretations of 103(a).

The Court also held that the finished Rocky IV film was not substantially similar to Anderson's treatment, because any similarities in ideas and expression between the two works flowed from the fact that both were continuations of the prior Rocky films, and the treatment and the finished film only shared broad ideas such as the theme of East–West confrontation.

== See also ==
- Copyright protection for fictional characters
