= The Last Ringbearer =

1999 fantasy book by Russian author Kirill Yeskov

- Russian print cover. The subtitle reads "A history of Middle-earth – through the eyes of the Enemy".
- Author: Kirill Yeskov
- Original title: Последний кольценосец
- Translator: Yisroel Markov
- Language: Russian
- Genre: Parallel novel, high fantasy, dark fantasy
- Publication date: 1999
- Publication place: Russia
- Media type: Print (paperback), ebook

The Last Ringbearer (Russian: Последний кольценосец, romanized: Posledniy kol'tsenosets) is a 1999 fantasy novel by Russian paleontologist Kirill Yeskov. It is a parallel account of, and an informal sequel to, the events of J. R. R. Tolkien's The Lord of the Rings. It has been translated into English by Yisroel Markov, but the translation has not been printed for fear of copyright action by the Tolkien Estate.

Critics have stated that the book is well-known to Tolkien fans in Russia, and that it provides an alternate take on the story. Scholars have variously called it a parody and a paraquel. They have interpreted it as a critique of totalitarianism, or of Tolkien's anti-modern racial and environmental vision coupled with a destruction of technology which could itself be called totalitarian. The book says little directly on real-world politics, but can be read as an ironic riposte to American exceptionalism.

== Premise ==
Kirill Yeskov bases his novel on the premise that the Tolkien account is a "history written by the victors". Mordor is home to an "amazing city of alchemists and poets, mechanics and astronomers, philosophers and physicians, the heart of the only civilization in Middle-earth to bet on rational knowledge and bravely pitch its barely adolescent technology against ancient magic", posing a threat to the war-mongering faction represented by Gandalf (whose attitude is described by Saruman as "crafting the Final Solution to the Mordorian problem") and the Elves.

Macy Halford, in The New Yorker, writes that The Last Ringbearer retells The Lord of the Rings "from the perspective of the bad guys, written by a Russian paleontologist in the late nineties and wildly popular in Russia". The book was written in the context of other Russian reinterpretations of Tolkien's works, such as Natalia Vasilyeva and Natalia Nekrasova's The Black Book of Arda, which treats Melkor as good and the Valar and Eru Ilúvatar as tyrannical rulers.

== Plot ==
...that amazing city of alchemists and poets, mechanics and astronomers, philosophers and physicians, the heart of the only civilization in Middle-earth to bet on rational knowledge and bravely pitch its barely adolescent technology against ancient magic. The shining tower of the Barad-dûr citadel rose over the plains of Mordor almost as high as Orodruin like a monument to Man – free Man who had politely but firmly declined the guardianship of the Dwellers on High and started living by his own reason. It was a challenge to the bone-headed aggressive West, which was still picking lice in its log 'castles' to the monotonous chanting of scalds extolling the wonders of never-existing Númenor.

— From The Last Ringbearer, chapter 2

The tale begins by recapitulating the War of the Ring. The Ring itself is a luxurious ornament, but powerless, crafted by the Nazgûl (a group of ancient scientists and philosophers who guide Mordor through its industrialization) to distract Gandalf and the Elves while Mordor built up its army. Aragorn is a puppet of the Elves, seeking to usurp the throne of Gondor by murdering Boromir before Gandalf removes Denethor. Arwen, being about 2700 years older, holds Aragorn in contempt, but uses their marriage to cement Elvish rule over Gondor. Faramir has been exiled to Ithilien, where he is kept under guard with Éowyn. The Elves have corrupted the youth of Umbar (using New-Age style mysticism), which they aim to use as a foothold into Harad and Khand.

After defeating the Mordorian army, the Elves enter Mordor to massacre civilians with the help of Men from the East, to eliminate the "educated" classes. Two Orc soldiers ("Orc" being a racial slur used by the West: the Orcs in Yeskov's book are humans), the medic Haladdin and Sergeant Tzerlag are fleeing the battle plain. They rescue Tangorn, a Gondorian noble who had been left buried in the desert for attempting to stop one of the massacres. They locate the mercenaries and kill the Elf Eloar.

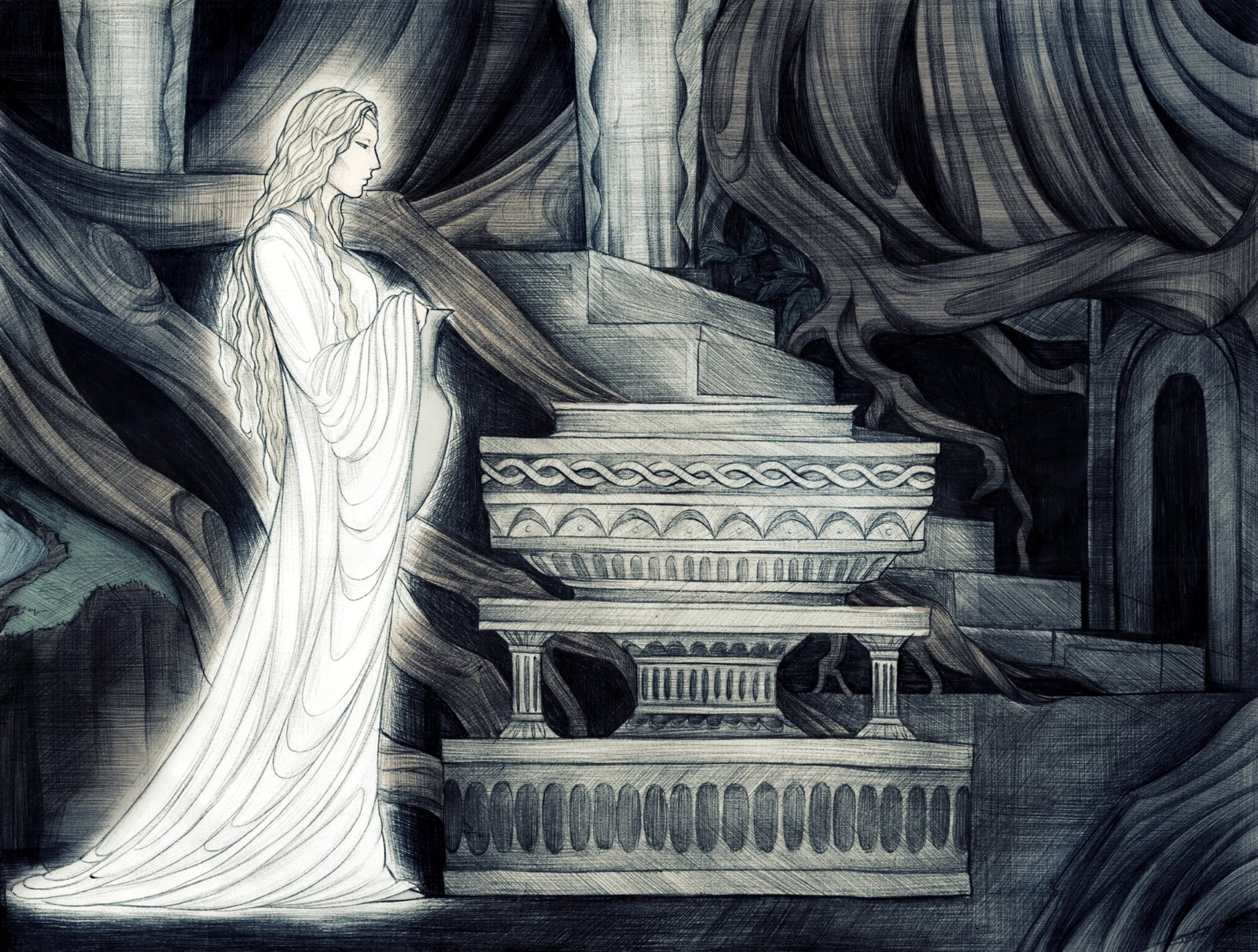
Galadriel in front of her fountain "Mirror", which Yeskov asserts is a magical device. Drawing by Tessa Boronski, 2011

The last of the Nazgûl, Sharya-Rana, visits Haladdin and explains that the physical world, Arda, is linked to the magical world from which the Elves came by the power of Galadriel's Mirror in Lórien and the palantírs. Haladdin is given the task of destroying the Mirror to separate the worlds and complete the goal of making men truly free. Haladdin is chosen as he is a rare individual in whom there is absolutely no magic and has a tendency to behave irrationally, for example joining the Mordorian army as a medic to impress his girlfriend and almost dying as a result, instead of putting his talents to better use at home in the university. While the Nazgûl cannot foresee how the quest is to be completed, he is able to provide Haladdin with useful information, including the current location of the palantírs.

An elaborate plan is devised which involves the forging of a letter from Eloar by a Mordorian handwriting expert. Tangorn manages to arrange a meeting with the Elves in Umbar, while evading Gondor's efforts to eliminate him. He succeeds in getting the letter to Eloar's brother Elandar. His plan succeeds when he is killed, an event which convinces the Elves to pass his message on to Eloar's mother, Eornis, a member of the ruling hierarchy of Lórien. She is led to believe that her son has been captured rather than killed. A palantír is dropped into Lórien by a Mordorian researcher developing flight-based weapons (under the secret patronage of Aragorn), and Eornis is instructed to bring the palantír to Galadriel's Mirror. This is supposed to prove that she is in Lórien, whereupon she will be allowed to communicate with Eloar.

Haladdin brings another palantír to Mount Doom. Gandalf figures out his plan and, concerned that magic will be banished from Middle-Earth, casts a spell on the palantír to turn its user into stone. Saruman, despite opposing Gandalf's methods, believes that Sharya-Rana's hypothesis about the relationship between the magical and physical worlds is incorrect and attempts to reason with Haladdin. However, Tzerlag touches the palantír by mistake and begins to turn into stone. Haladdin decides to drop the palantír into Orodruin because Saruman is unable to reverse Gandalf's spell. This causes the Eternal Fire to be transmitted to the other palantírs and the Mirror, destroying them and the magic of the Elves.

Haladdin goes into self-imposed exile and Tzerlag's descendants pass on the story orally, but the official record contains Aragorn's version of events. Despised by the Gondorian aristocracy, Aragorn finds favour with the people, as his policies result in an "economic miracle". After his death, childless, the throne reverts to the "rightful" king, Faramir. The Elves end their occupation of Mordor and leave Middle-Earth, which enters the industrial age.

== Publication ==
The book was first published by ACT of Moscow in Russian in 1999. It was reprinted in Russian by Folio of Kharkov in 2002, and by the print on demand publisher CreateSpace in 2015.

Though translated into several languages, the book has not had a commercial release in English, for fear of legal action by the Tolkien Estate. In 2010, Yisroel Markov translated the book into English, with a second edition released in 2011 fixing typos and revising the prose as well as providing ebook formatted versions; his text has appeared as a free and non-commercial ebook, and Yeskov has officially approved this release. Mark Le Fanu, general secretary of the Society of Authors, opined that despite being non-commercial, the book still constitutes a copyright infringement.

=== Translations ===
- Czech: Poslední Pán Prstenu, Fantom Print, 2003. ISBN 978-8086354330
- English: The Last Ringbearer (online only)
- Estonian: Viimane sõrmusekandja, Fantasy, 2010. ISBN 978-9-9494-5910-0
- French: Le Dernier Anneau, 500nuancesdegeek, 2018. ISBN 979-10-90692-43-5
- German: Der letzte Ringträger, Radiator, 2024. ISBN 978-3-911265-10-2
- Polish: Ostatni powiernik Pierścienia, Red Horse, 1999. ISBN 978-83-6050-426-0, translated by Eugeniusz Dębski and Ewa Dębska
- Polish: Ostatni Władca Pierścienia, Solaris, 2002. ISBN 978-83-88431-28-9 (same translation)
- Portuguese: O Último Anel, Saída de Emergência, 2008. ISBN 978-9-7288-3959-8
- Spanish: El último anillo, debolsillo, 2011. ISBN 978-8-4998-9101-9

== Reception ==
=== Critical ===
The American journalist Laura Miller praises The Last Ringbearer in Salon as "a well-written, energetic adventure yarn that offers an intriguing gloss on what some critics have described as the overly simplistic morality of Tolkien's masterpiece." She notes that Markov's is the "official" translation, approved by Yeskov, and more polished than earlier translations of some sections of the book. In her view, there are "still some rough edges", such as the mix of present and past tenses at the start, and what she calls the "(classically Russian) habit" of adding sections of political or military history to the narrative. Noting that the book has been called fan fiction, Miller comments that it is nothing like the teenage girl fantasy genre of "unlikely romantic pairings" of characters from the canon. She likens it instead to Alice Randall's The Wind Done Gone, a retelling of Gone with the Wind, stating that Yeskov's is the better book.

Benedicte Page, writing in The Guardian, states that the book is well-known to fans in Russia, and that it is based on "the idea that Tolkien's own text is the romantic legend of the winning party in the War of the Rings, and that a closer examination of it as a historical document reveals an alternate version of the story."

Terri Schwartz, writing on MTV, describes the book's take, with a warmongering Gandalf who seeks only to "crush the scientific and technological initiative of Mordor", while a forward-thinking Sauron passes a "universal literacy law", as "certainly a different take on the story, to say the least." Journalist Luka Ivan Jukic asserted that Yeskov attempted to refute what he perceived as the "simplistic Western notion of the Cold War as a struggle between good and evil". According to Ivan Jukic, Yeskov favoured the view that there were "no good guys" in the story.

=== Academic ===
The scholar of English literature Catherine Coker describes the novel as "transparent revisionism" and "a Russian parody" which repurposes the characters' ideologies "so that the heroic epic becomes a critique of totalitarianism". In her view, with Tolkien's idealism removed, the story is changed radically, becoming "emphatically, a work in its own right".

Mark Wolf, a scholar of video gaming and imaginary worlds, calls the work a paraquel, a narrative that runs at the same time as the original story, with a different perspective.

The independent scholar of culture and comparative literature Greg Clinton, noting that Yeskov depicts Sauron and his industrial realm of Mordor as "not 'evil', but ... working to modernize production", comments that the book sees something that he believes Tolkien missed, namely that destroying technology in favour of nature as The Lord of the Rings suggests would itself be "a totalitarian move".

The scholar of culture David Ashford describes the novel as a "splendid counter-factual fantasy", calling it the "most entertaining" and best-known Russian retelling, despite Tolkien's direct statement rejecting any link between Orcs and Russia: "To ask if the Orcs 'are' Communists is to me as sensible as asking if Communists are Orcs." Eliot Borenstein comments that Yeskov's book says little about real-world politics, despite possible allusions to a "final solution", but that it does support an idea from Russian science fiction, namely that if "American exceptionalis[ts]" like Ronald Reagan and George W. Bush want Russia to be their "evil empire", then fine, "but we'll do it with an irony and pride that you'll never entirely comprehend."

Robert Stuart, a Tolkien scholar interested in the question of Tolkien and race, comments that Yeskov's book is "evidently particularly effective in critiquing the anti-modern dimension of Tolkien's ideological viewpoint".

The scholar Una McCormack writes that the book, a work of Tolkien fan fiction by a male author, has garnered more than its share of attention, while large numbers of "excellent" works of fan fiction by women are overlooked.

=== Awards ===
In 2001 the book earned the Strannik Literary Award in the "Sword in the Stone" (Fantasy) nomination.

== See also ==
- Bored of the Rings – Parody novel
- Khraniteli – Live-action Soviet teleplay adaptation of The Fellowship of the Ring
- The Gospel of Afranius – a prior work by Yeskov
- Tanya Grotter – a character resembling one in Harry Potter
