= White v. Samsung Electronics America, Inc. =

American legal case

- Court: United States Court of Appeals for the Ninth Circuit
- Full case name: White v. Samsung Electronics America, Inc.
- Argued: June 7, 1991
- Decided: July 29, 1992
- Citation: 971 F.2d 1395 (9th Cir. 1992);

Case history
- Prior history: Appeal from C.D. Cal.
- Subsequent history: En banc review denied, 989 F.2d 1512 (9th Cir. 1993)

Holding
- The common law doctrine of right of publicity is not limited to only those instances in which an individual's name or appearance is appropriated.

Court membership
- Judges sitting: Alfred Goodwin, Harry Pregerson, Arthur Alarcón

Case opinions
- Majority: Goodwin, joined by Pregerson

Laws applied
- Lanham Act (15 U.S.C. § 1125)

White v. Samsung Electronics America, Inc., 971 F.2d 1395 (9th Cir. 1992); 989 F.2d 1512 (9th Cir. 1993), is a 1992 and 1993 case of the United States Court of Appeals for the Ninth Circuit upholding a cause of action on the part of TV show personality Vanna White against Samsung for depicting a robot on a Wheel of Fortune–style set in a humorous advertisement.

== Facts ==
Wheel of Fortune hostess Vanna White had established herself as a TV personality, and consequently appeared as a spokesperson for advertisers. Samsung produced a television commercial advertising its VCRs, showing a robot wearing a dress and with other similarities to White standing beside a Wheel of Fortune game board. Samsung, in their own internal documents, called this the "Vanna White ad". White sued Samsung for violations of California Civil Code section 3344, California common law right of publicity, and the federal Lanham Act. The United States District Court for the Southern District of California granted summary judgment against White on all counts, and White appealed.

== Result ==
The Ninth Circuit reversed the District Court, finding that White had a cause of action based on the value of her image, and that Samsung had appropriated this image. Samsung's assertion that this was a parody was found to be unavailing, as the intent of the ad was not to make fun of White's characteristics, but to sell VCRs.

White, whose annual income is estimated to be over $4 million, sought $6.9 million in damages. Following the appeals, White returned to the District Court, and was ultimately awarded $403,000 for the use of her image.

== Dissent ==
Judge Alex Kozinski dissented from an order rejecting the suggestion for rehearing en banc an appeal filed by Vanna White, stating "All creators draw in part on the work of those who came before, referring to it, building on it, poking fun at it; we call this creativity, not piracy."

An extended extract from the opinion is widely quoted:

Overprotecting intellectual property is as harmful as underprotecting it. Creativity is impossible without a rich public domain. Nothing today, likely nothing since we tamed fire, is genuinely new: Culture, like science and technology, grows by accretion, each new creator building on the works of those who came before. Overprotection stifles the very creative forces it's supposed to nurture.

Kozinski's dissent in White is also famous for his sarcastic remark that "for better or worse, we are the Court of Appeals for the Hollywood Circuit".
