= Association Littéraire et Artistique Internationale =

International writers' organization (1878-)

The Association Littéraire et Artistique Internationale (ALAI; lit. 'International Literary and Artistic Association') was founded in 1878 in Paris. Victor Hugo was the honorary president and founder of the association. The group gave itself the objective of creating an international convention for the protection of writers' and artists' rights, which was achieved eight years later with the Berne Convention on September 9, 1886. It continues to exist today and it is considered one of the premier international organizations that continues to suggest law reform in connection with the movement for international copyright law.
