= Copyright protection for fictional characters =

Copyright protection is available to fixed expressions of fictional characters in literary, musical, dramatic and artistic works. Recognition of fictional characters as works eligible for copyright protection has come about in some countries with the understanding that characters can be separated from the original works they were embodied in and acquire a new life by featuring in subsequent works.

== United States ==
In the United States, in order to avail of copyright protection, a work must be original; that is, it must involve an element of creativity, and must be fixed in a tangible medium. Further, there can be no copyright in mere ideas and facts, but only in the unique expression of the same.

The Compendium of U.S. Copyright Office Practices defines a character as "a person, animal, or even an inanimate object that is used to portray the content of a dramatic work." The name and general idea for a character cannot be copyrighted, but copyright may protect "the authorship describing, depicting, or embodying a character."

The Copyright Act of 1976 does not explicitly mention fictional characters as subject matter of copyright, and their copyrightability is a product of common law. Historically, the Courts granted copyright protection to characters as parts of larger protected work and not as independent creations. They were regarded as "components in copyrighted works" and only protected insofar as their containing works were protected. Nichols v. Universal Pictures Corp. (1930) is considered a landmark case that established the doctrine of characters as potentially copyrightable works of expression, independent of the stories from which they originated.

=== Types of copyrightable expression ===
==== Visual and literary characters ====
Visual depictions of characters may be subject to copyright protection, such as this 1928 image of Mickey Mouse, which is now in the public domain in the United States.

Copyright protection is available to both characters that have been solely described in writing, as well as characters depicted in a visual or graphic form. What is required is that the character in question possesses original or a set of distinctive traits, and visual representation is not essential. For example, simple representation of anthropomorphic versions of human emotions by color is not sufficient for copyright without unique characterization traits. If the literary character is not depicted in a visual form, and has only been described in writing in a few lines, then the character cannot enjoy copyright. On the other hand, where the characters, like Sherlock Holmes and Dr. Watson are found to be distinctive enough, they are held to be subject matter of copyright, even if they are merely in written form. Copyright protection may be granted to comic characters where the physical and conceptual characteristics find unique expression in graphic form.

==== Components of character identity ====
Copyright protection may also be afforded to the individual components of a character's identity. For instance, copyrightability was granted to the glove worn by Freddy Krueger, the antagonist in the movie A Nightmare on Elm Street, on the grounds that it helped identify the character, and therefore enjoyed a distinct protection separate from the character. Similarly, the superhero Batman’s car, the Batmobile, was held to be protectable by copyright because firstly it had a set of distinctive traits, and secondly these traits could be separated from the utilitarian functions of the car and be represented in pictorial, sculptural and graphic form.

==== Stock characters ====
The scènes à faire doctrine holds that those scenes or aspects that are indispensable to the story or are standard expressions cannot be copyrighted. This limitation also applies to fictional characters. Therefore, stock characters or archetypical and hackneyed elements are disqualified from protection by virtue of the fact that they are not unique in their expression.

=== Copyrightability tests ===
Following Nichols, the American judiciary has evolved two main tests to determine whether a character in a work can be eligible for copyright protection.

==== Well-delineated test ====
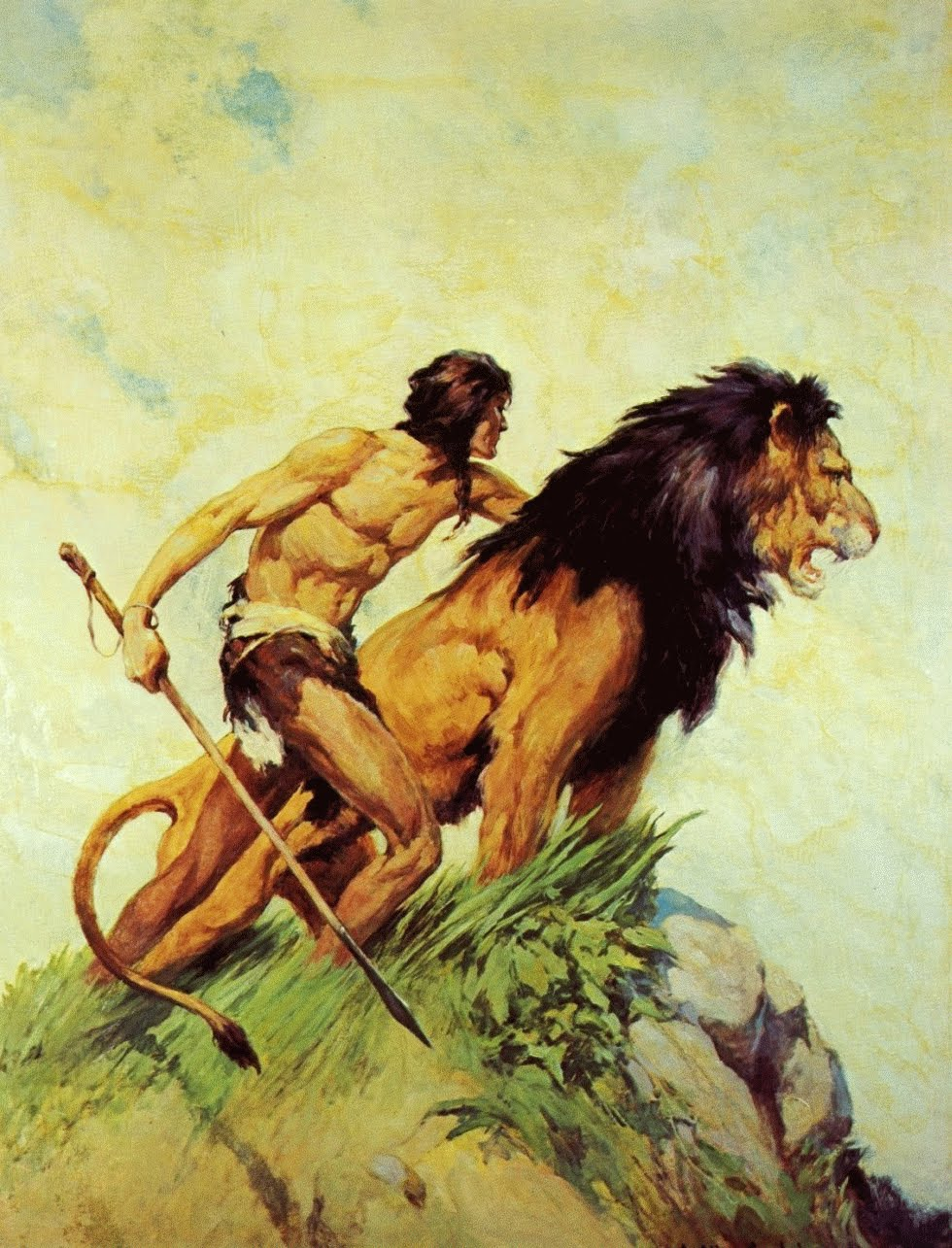
Tarzan character was mentioned in passing in Nichols v. Universal Pictures Corp. judgment

In Nichols, the United States Court of Appeals for the Second Circuit denied protection to the plaintiff's characters on the grounds that they were not "distinctly delineated", but poorly developed. The plaintiff's characters of the Jewish gentleman and the poor Irish Catholic girl he loved were regarded to be no more than mere "prototypes". Judge Hand held that the less developed the character, the less the copyrightability of the same. Copyright protection shall therefore be enjoyed by a character provided it is well delineated. By applying this test, copyright protection was held to subsist in the character of Tarzan because it was found to be "sufficiently delineated." Similarly, the character of Superman was held to be well delineated by virtue of embodying original literary expressions and incidents, and therefore deserving of copyright.

Under this approach, a three-step test is required to be followed:

1. The character must possess physical and conceptual attributes.
2. The character must be "sufficiently delineated" to be identified as the same character across multiple occasions. He must therefore show consistent traits. However, the character need not have a consistent appearance.
3. The character must be "especially distinctive" and "contain some unique elements of expression."

The consistency of a character's traits and attributes is considered as the key factor for whether the character qualifies for copyright protection.

Some scholars have criticized the Nichols test as vague and subjective. Jacqueline Lai Chung argues that the court's finding in Burroughs v. MGM (1981)—that Tarzan was "distinctly delineated"—lacked a clear explanation and appeared to depend mainly on the court's ability to list descriptive traits of the character.

==== Story being told test ====
The second approach was propounded by the United States Court of Appeals for the Ninth Circuit in Warner Bros. v. Columbia Broadcast Systems. The Ninth Circuit court ruled that a character can avail of copyright protection only if it “constitutes the story being told”. In this case, the character in question, Sam Spade of the Maltese Falcon detective novel, was held to be a “mere vehicle” for carrying the story forward. Accordingly, copyright protection did not prevail. The holding in Warner Bros. case came to be known as the Sam Spade Test; this approach does not allow for copyright protection if the character is a “mere chessman in the game of storytelling.”

On the other hand, if the character is central to the story, then it will be copyrightable. In the case of Universal City Studios v. Kamar Industries this test was applied to hold that E.T. was a distinctive character around whom the story in the movie E.T. the Extra-Terrestrial revolved. Therefore, the copyright in E.T. was held to be enjoyed by Universal Studios, and the defendants were held liable for a violation of the Studios’ copyright by the manufacturing and sale of goods under the title ‘E.T. Home Phones’.

The American judiciary has followed both these tests. There have also been a number of instances where the Court has used both the tests in its analysis. For instance, in Anderson v Stallone, it was held that the character Rocky played by movie star Sylvester Stallone in the eponymous movie franchise had come to be identified with certain physical traits and mannerisms that qualified as a well delineated character. Further, this ‘highly developed’ character was held to constitute the story being told. Similarly, the character of James Bond was awarded copyright protection on the grounds of being both sufficiently delineated as well as central to the story being told. The fact that the character had been played by multiple actors was not held to be relevant since the characteristics associated with Bond had remained consistent across sixteen films.

=== Infringement ===
In cases of copyright infringement of a fictional character, a two-step test developed by the American courts has to be satisfied. Firstly, it must be established that the character in question is capable of being copyrighted. Secondly, it must be demonstrated that there has been an infringement of this unique expression. The delineation test and the story being told tests as explained above are used to determine the copyrightability of the character, and the Court must check whether the same is precluded from being afforded protection by virtue of applicability of the scenes a faire doctrine. Following this, the actual infringement is to be decided by comparing the original and allegedly infringing work for “substantial similarities” in appearance, as well as in personality traits.

=== Non-copyright protection ===
Protection of fictional characters may also be derived from certain alternative sources in American law.

Trademark rights may be enjoyed in a fictional character and can be enforced as such. To determine trademark infringement, it must be shown that the fictional character has acquired a "secondary meaning" and that there is a likelihood of confusion to be caused to the public by the defendant's mark if it is deceptively similar to the original. Characters such as Mickey Mouse have been held to have acquired such a secondary meaning and are thus protected under trademark law.

The right to publicity traces its origins in the tort of privacy and is the right to prevent others from commercially exploiting one's name and likeness. The portrayal of the Marx Brothers as characters in a play was held to be an infringement of their right to publicity.

Under the doctrine of dilution, the plaintiff can seek relief for the whittling away of a character's value. This doctrine has been applied for protection of fictional characters including that of Superman. In DC Comics v. Unlimited Monkey Business, the defendants' costumes were found to present a likelihood of dilution of the plaintiff's trademark in the Superman film character.

In order for a plaintiff to argue that a fictional character has been misappropriated, the plaintiff must demonstrate that a substantial amount of time and effort has been invested into producing said character, that the defendant has appropriated it, and that such appropriation has caused loss to the plaintiff. The action of taking the plaintiff's news bulletins and selling to its competitors was held to be a case of misappropriation.

== India ==
Section 13 of the Indian Copyright Act, 1957 allows for copyright in original literary, artistic, musical and dramatic works, as well as in sound recordings and cinematography films. The statute does not recognise fictional characters as subject matter of copyright, and protection for the same is derived from judge-made law.

The first instance where this issue was brought into light was in the case of Malayala Manorama v VT Thomas. The Kerala High Court held that the defendant owned the copyright in his cartoon characters that he had created before entering into the plaintiff's employment.

Subsequently, the Delhi High Court in Raja Pocket Books v Radha Pocket Books found that the plaintiff's copyright in his comic character the herpetologist ‘Nagraj’ had been infringed by the defendant's character ‘Nagesh’ based on the semantic and phonetic similarities in their respective characters’ names, as well as in their visual representations and conceptual characteristics.

However, the Court in VT Thomas did not discuss independent copyright in characters as this case was concerned with the issue of ownership of copyright. Further, the comparative analysis in Raja Pocket Books to arrive at a conclusion of infringement was undertaken by the Court without firstly stating that copyright subsisted in the plaintiff's character.

Therefore, in India, it can be implied that copyright protection is available to fictional characters, but the judiciary is yet to lay down any criteria for availing this protection.

=== Alternate protection ===
In India, recourse can be had to trademark law which recognises that fictional characters enjoy goodwill, and provides relief for cases of ‘character merchandising’. Character merchandising has been defined as involving the exploitation of fictional characters by licensing these fictional characters in the case of Star India Private Limited vs Leo Burnett (India) Private Ltd. A prerequisite for character merchandising is that the character to be merchandised must have gained some public recognition, independently of the original product in which it appears. In this case, the characters in the plaintiff's were found not have acquired an independent recognition as a commodity, and therefore the suit for character merchandising by the defendants failed.

== See also ==
- Anderson v. Stallone
- Cross-licensing
- DC Comics v Mark Towle
- Klinger v. Conan Doyle Estate, Ltd.
- Legal issues with fan fiction
- Lupin the Third § Copyright issues
- Nichols v. Universal Pictures Corp.
- Solar Pons
- Société Plon et autres v. Pierre Hugo et autres
- Stardock Systems, Inc. v. Reiche
- Suntrust Bank v. Houghton Mifflin Co.
- Universal City Studios, Inc. v. Nintendo Co., Ltd.
