= Nichols v. Universal Pictures Corp. =

American legal case on copyright in characters

Nichols v. Universal Pictures Corporation
- Court: United States Court of Appeals for the Second Circuit
- Decided: November 10, 1930
- Citation: 45 F.2d 119 (2d Cir. 1930)

Case history
- Prior history: 34 F.2d 145 (S.D.N.Y. 1929)

Court membership
- Judges sitting: Learned Hand, Thomas Walter Swan, Augustus Noble Hand

Case opinions
- Majority: L. Hand, joined by Swan, A. Hand

Nichols v. Universal Pictures Corporation, 45 F.2d 119 (2d Cir. 1930), was a United States Court of Appeals for the Second Circuit case on copyright infringement by non-literal copying of a dramatic work. The Court held that copyright protection cannot be extended to the characteristics of stock characters in a story, whether it be a book, play, or film.

== Facts ==
The plaintiff, playwright Anne Nichols, was the author of Abie's Irish Rose, a 1922 play about a young Jewish man who marries an Irish Catholic girl against the wishes of both of their fathers, with hilarity ensuing. The defendant then produced The Cohens and Kellys (1926) (which the court referred to as "The Cohens and the Kellys"), a film based on a play about an Irish boy who marries a Jewish girl from feuding families, with hilarity ensuing. A lawsuit followed, with the plaintiff asserting copyright infringement based on the defendant's use of similar story elements.

The question before the Court was whether the defendant's film infringed the plaintiff's copyright in the play by using similar elements.

== Opinion of the Court ==
Judge Learned Hand, writing for the Court, noted that protection of literature cannot be limited to the exact text, or else an infringer could get away with copying by making trivial changes. The question then is whether the part taken was 'substantial'. However, it is impossible to set a firm boundary demarcating the line between work and ideas, he said, stating, "her copyright did not cover everything that might be drawn from her play; its content went to some extent into the public domain." In this case, there was no infringement, as the ideas that are copied are really universal concepts and stock characters.

== See also ==
- Copyright protection for fictional characters
- Klinger v. Conan Doyle Estate, Ltd.
