= Société Plon et autres v. Pierre Hugo et autres =

French Court case on authors' rights and public domain

- Court: Court of Cassation
- Decided: January 30, 2007
- Citation: 04-15.543

Court membership
- Judges sitting: Mme Marais (Judge-Rapporteur); M. Ancel (President); M. Sarcelet (Advocate General)

Keywords
- Intellectual Property, droit moral, copyright, French copyright, public domain, Victor Hugo

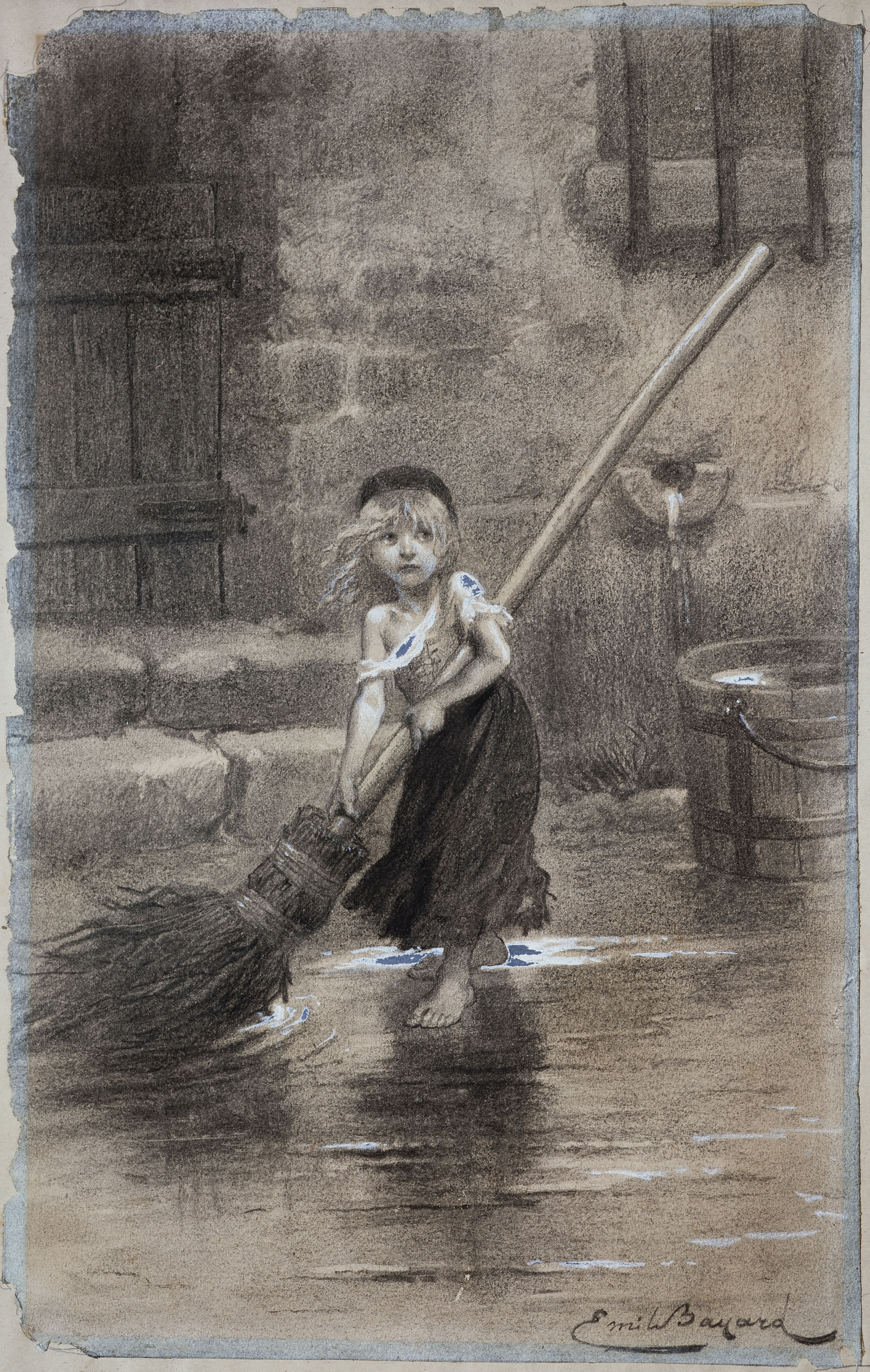
Public domain depiction of Cosette in Les Misérables by Victor Hugo and later the subject of the sequel in this case

Société Plon et autres v. Pierre Hugo et autres, 04–15.543 Arrêt n° 125 (Jan. 30, 2007), is a decision by the First Civil Chamber of the Cour de Cassation (the high court in France) which ruled that François Cérésa's adaptations/sequels of Les Misérables do not per se violate the droit moral of its author Victor Hugo and his estate. Droit moral originated in France, this case serves to limit the scope of that right and expand the public domain in French copyright law.

This overruled and remanded to the lower appeals court, the Cour d'Appeal de Paris, which had declared a symbolic 1 Euro penalty, declaring that "no sequel can ever be added to so great a work as Les Misérables".

== Background of the case ==
Ceresa wrote Cosette (titled “Cosette ou le temps des illusions” in French) and Marius (French title “Marius ou le Fugitif”) in 2001, 136 years after Victor Hugo's death, and 149 years after the original publication of Les Misérables. While the presumptive duration of copyright rights had expired, there remained a question of whether Hugo's heirs were entitled to rights under the theory of droit moral. This case was brought by Victor Hugo's great-great-grandson Pierre Hugo (heirs are severally capable of bringing actions for droit moral under French law) and Société des gens de lettres alleging infringement by the publisher of both books Plon and their author Cérésa. Hugo claimed damages of 675,000 Euro.

The droit moral, codified in French law under article L111-1 of the Intellectual Property code, provides for a non-marketable right enforceable against all by the author, corresponding with the embodiment of the self that is contained within each respective work. While the term of economic copyright in France was relatively settled, a conflict within this case was the duration of these non-economic rights which under a literal reading of L121-7-1 are indefinite. Distinguishing the economic from non-economic even outside the context of the Anglo-American IP construct is difficult.

== The Court's Decision ==
In a characteristically short opinion the Cour de Cassation addressed three issues. Whether (1) there was breach under typical copyright law or standing to bring the suit, (2) société des gens des lettres had standing as a voluntary third party to join the suit, and (3) Hugo's droit moral was violated (under L111-1, L121 & Article 10 of the European Convention on Human Rights)

The court straightforwardly accepted that Pierre Hugo has the right to bring suit under French law but not under traditional copyright because those rights had expired in 1957 and grants Société des Gens des Lettres status.

The Court made two rulings about Hugo's droit moral. First, since all of his rights under copyright had expired his estate's monopoly on the right of adaptation had expired and that while any adaptation may prejudice the droit moral of Victor Hugo to some extent, that was necessary because the term had expired. Second, that the appellate court failed to identify the specific mechanism by which Hugo's image was tarnished.

The latter ruling (while it is explained below that on remand the court found no such tarnishing) leaves the possibility that if a specific injury could be identified there could be damages.

=== Right of Attribution ===
During the course of litigation, Pierre Hugo, trying to define his claim in layman's terms, stated "I don't mind adaptations and many are very good but this book is not an adaptation. I have read it and it is not badly written but the publishers used Victor Hugo's name and the title Les Miserables as a commercial operation ... It was nothing to do with literature, they were just trying to make money." While droit moral certainly extends beyond the US right of attribution this statement conflates the two.

The Court's opinion provides a better distinction, although not entirely clear by ruling, "altering the vision of Hugo/altéré l'oeuvre de Victor Hugo" or giving birth to "a confusion as to the origin or the work/une confusion sur leur paternité".

=== Quality of the Work ===
Throughout the litigation the French Courts cite the importance of Hugo's work. The only connection made, however, between the importance of the work and the scope of the protection that it deserved was the Cour d'Appel's concession that delineating the points of personality from the work was difficult. This analysis would be useful for more ordinary works, even ones which still enjoy protection from economic exploitation.

=== Transformativeness ===
Both parties argued that the sequels were transformative at the trial and first appellate level. Whereas Hugo's estate argued that the transformative nature diluted the protected essential personality of the work, Plon argued that the transformative nature was made it less likely that the work borrowed the essential, protected personality. While this issue was not addressed by the Cour de Cassation, it is an argument which may bear fruit in subsequent droit moral litigation.

== Subsequent developments ==
Upon reexamination after the high court's remand the Appeals court concluded that Cérésa's work did not interfere with Hugo's. The court further imputed that Hugo was not hostile to adaptations of his work, leaving open the possibility that a hostile author might have more rights. Representatives for Plon were quoted saying, “This is a great success, and because of this books will continue to appear freely." ("Les livres pourront continuer à paraître tout à fait librement, c'est un grand succès pour nous") As of May 2013, no subsequent suit has been filed with either the European Court of Human Rights or the European Court of Justice. Either court would have the power to overrule the French national courts, but it is unlikely either would find reason (either factual or legal) to do so.

=== Implications ===
Scholars believe this case opens the door in French courts for an inquiry into droit moral for any derivative work, whether or not is otherwise in the public domain. However, the decision aids writers, filmmakers and playwrights in that it does serve to protect the public domain.

== See also ==
- Klinger v. Conan Doyle Estate, Ltd. – United States Court case on copyright in fictional characters
- Spiritual successor
- Xavier Skowron-Galvez (4 May 2009). "Un (mauvais) coup porté au droit moral de l'auteur - L'affaire "Les Misérables" (in French).
- Julien Horn (February 2, 2007). "Les Misérables, suite ou fin ?". Le Monde (in French).
- Alan Riding (May 29, 2001). "Victor Hugo Can't Rest in Peace, As The Sequel Makes Trouble". New York Times.
