= Suntrust Bank v. Houghton Mifflin Co. =

United States court case on copyright and fair use

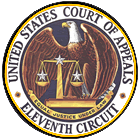
- Court: United States Court of Appeals for the Eleventh Circuit
- Full case name: Suntrust Bank, as Trustee of the Stephen Mitchell trusts f.b.o. Eugene Muse Mitchell and Joseph Reynolds Mitchell v. Houghton Mifflin Company
- Decided: 10 October 2001
- Citation: 268 F.3d 1257

Case history
- Prior history: 136 F.Supp.2d 1357

Court membership
- Judges sitting: Birch, Marcus, Wood (of the 7th Cir., sitting by designation)

Case opinions
- Majority: Birch, joined by a unanimous court
- Concurrence: Marcus

Suntrust Bank v. Houghton Mifflin Co., 268 F.3d 1257 (11th Cir. 2001), was a case decided by the United States Court of Appeals for the Eleventh Circuit against the owner of Margaret Mitchell's 1936 novel Gone with the Wind, vacating an injunction prohibiting the publisher of Alice Randall's 2001 parody, The Wind Done Gone, from distributing the book.

The Court of Appeals recognized copyright in several characters from Gone with the Wind and found that The Wind Done Gone had "appropriate[d] numerous characters, settings, and plot twists". However, the court decided that this appropriation was protected under the doctrine of fair use.

This case arguably stands for the principle that the creation and publication of a carefully written parody novel in the United States counts as fair use. In permitting parody without permission, the decision followed the 1994 United States Supreme Court decision in Campbell v. Acuff-Rose Music, Inc. which ruled that 2 Live Crew's unlicensed use of the bass line from Roy Orbison's song "Oh, Pretty Woman" could constitute fair use even though the work was a commercial use, and extended that principle from songs to novels. It is binding precedent in the Eleventh Circuit.

Mitchell's estate chose to drop the suit after publisher Houghton agreed to make a donation to Morehouse College.

== See also ==
- Copyright protection for fictional characters
