= Stargate (disambiguation) =

Stargate is a military science fiction adventure franchise.

Stargate may also refer to:

== Arts and entertainment ==
=== Film and television ===
- Stargate (film), a 1994 science-fiction film directed by Roland Emmerich
  - Stargate SG-1, a science-fiction television series first aired in 1997, a continuation of the story in 1994 movie
    - Stargate (comics), a comic-book series based on the SG-1 series
    - Stargate: The Ark of Truth, a 2008 science-fiction film made for DVD and television
    - Stargate: Continuum, a 2008 science-fiction film made for DVD and television
    - Stargate: Revolution, working title of a cancelled science-fiction film made for DVD and television
  - Stargate Infinity, an SG-1 spin-off cartoon series first aired in 2002
  - Stargate Atlantis, an SG-1 spin-off television series first aired in 2004
  - Stargate: Extinction (working title), a cancelled science-fiction film made for DVD and television
  - Stargate Universe, an SG-1 spin-off television series first aired in 2009
  - Stargate Origins, a Stargate (film)/SG-1 spin-off web series first aired in 2018
  - Stargate (device), the central device in the movie and television shows
- Stargate, the technology used for interstellar travel in the TV series Buck Rogers in the 25th Century
- Stargate, a fictional accusation in the Community episode "Contemporary American Poultry"

==== Television episodes ====
- "Stargate", Kaamelott season 2, episode 18 (2005)
- "Stargate", Logan's Run episode 14 (1978)
- "Stargate", The Adventures of the Galaxy Rangers episode 29 (1986)
- "Stargate II", Kaamelott season 3, episode 43 (2006)
- "Star Gate", Extreme Universe episode 6 (2010)
- "Star Gate", Pets season 2, episode 5 (2002)

=== Games ===
- List of Stargate games - includes roleplaying games and video games based on the Stargate franchise
- Stargate: Resistance, a 2010 team-based third-person shooter based on the Stargate universe
- Stargate (pinball), a game produced by Gottlieb based on the 1994 film
- Stargate (1995 console video game), a game for the Super Nintendo Entertainment System and Sega Genesis based on the 1994 film
- Stargate: Timekeepers, a 2024 real-time strategy game by Slitherine
- Stargate (1981 video game), also known as Defender II, a 1981 arcade game

=== Literature ===
- Star Gate (novel), a 1958 novel by Andre Norton
- Stargate, a 1976 science-fiction novel by Stephen Robinett
- Stargate, a science fantasy novel by Pauline Gedge published in 1982
- The Star Gate, an alien artifact in the novel 2001: A Space Odyssey
- StarGate, a device in the Sara Douglass series Wayfarer Redemption

=== Other media ===
- The Stargate, a 1999 album by Mortiis

== Companies ==
- Stargate LLC, a 2025 American artificial intelligence joint venture of OpenAI, Oracle, MGX, and Softbank
- Stargate (music producers), Norwegian record producers
- Stargate Studios, a visual effects company

== Science and technology ==
- Stargate YT-33, turbojet powered derivative of the Windstar YF-80 aircraft
- STARGATE, an RF tracking facility of the University of Texas at Brownsville, started in 2014
- Star Gate, an illusion in John Horton Conway's Game of Life where spaceships seem faster than the speed of light

== Other uses ==
- Stargate Project (U.S. Army unit), a series of remote viewing experiments performed by the CIA, Army, and DIA from 1972 to 1995
- Stargate School, a school in Colorado, US
- Stargate, a settlement on the outskirts of Ryton, Tyne and Wear, England

== See also ==
- Stargate Project (disambiguation)
- Stargate Worlds, a cancelled MMORPG based on the Stargate universe
- Starr Gate, a place in Blackpool, England
