= Universe (role-playing game) =

Science fiction tabletop role-playing game

- Cover art by John Pierard
- Designers: John H. Butterfield, Gerard C. Klug
- Publishers: Simulation Publications
- Publication: 1981 (1st edition); 1982 (2nd edition)
- Genres: Science fiction
- Systems: Custom

Universe: The Role-Playing Game of the Future is a science fiction role-playing game published by Simulation Publications, Inc (SPI) from 1981 to 1983. It was praised for its innovative and tightly organized rules for such sci-fi RPG concerns as generating planets, applying character skills to in-game situations, and resolving the initial moments of alien encounters; however, it was also criticized for its cumbersome encounter/combat system and its lack of compelling background material. Universe was also noted for its "striking" Interstellar Display, a poster-sized, astronomically accurate map of all stars within 30 light-years of Earth.

Universe was SPI's answer to Game Designers Workshop's award-winning Traveller sci-fi RPG. Universe co-developer Gerry Klug (who was an experienced Traveller referee) set out "to 'fix' all the ill written and illogical rules [he] felt had been perpetrated on the science fiction role-playing community".

The first edition of Universe, published in March 1981, was released as a boxed set. A year later, the second edition consolidated most of the game components into a single softcover book, published by Bantam. SPI planned several adventures and supplements for Universe, but in 1983, financial difficulties led to SPI being bought out by TSR, Inc (creator of Dungeons & Dragons). TSR, which had its own sci-fi RPG (Star Frontiers), soon ended development of Universe. The last official mention of Universe was in July 1984, in the "StarQuestions" Q & A feature of TSR's Dragon magazine #87.

== Setting ==
Universe is set in the mid-24th Century. Humankind has explored and colonized many star systems within 20 light-years of Earth. Some of the star systems closest to Earth are quite prosperous and populous, some having a billion or more inhabitants. Settlements further out amount to tentative colonies or even mere research facilities. Very few stars beyond 25 light-years have been colonized or even explored. Native extraterrestrial creatures are fairly common, but no intelligent alien civilization has yet been encountered.

The Universe is governed from Earth by the "Federation of Planets". The Federation has exclusive control of spaceports as well as substantial law enforcement and military power, but refrains from intervening in planetary matters unless there is piracy, violent insurrection, or heinous exploitation of nascent colonies. Most colonized planets have retained the language and some of the national character of the planet's original pioneers (e.g. Chinese, Norwegian, "Arctican", etc.). The Earth itself is described as once again beautiful, green and flourishing.

A small minority of humans possess powerful psionic abilities such as mind-reading and telekinesis. These powers, enabled by a rarely occurring combination of genes that were scientifically "awakened" in the 21st century, make psions indispensable to interstellar travel. This is because a spaceship's hyperjump engine must be triggered by an onboard psionic "navigator". These psionic individuals ("psions") form an introspective and aloof community, viewed by many in the general populace as elitist and somewhat freakish.

== System ==
=== Character Generation and Professions ===
Character generation in Universe is a semi-random process of rolling dice, consulting a succession of tables, and making decisions based on the results. Universe is a "classless" RPG; characters are not limited to certain abilities based on a genre-inspired character class assigned to the character.

==== Childhood and Adolescence ====
The process starts with determining the character's homeworld type and family background, as well as the values of his four childhood "Potential Multipliers" (Physique, Coordination, Intellect, and Social Background). The player then chooses which Fields of Study the character pursues in his adolescence, such as Theoretical or Applied Science, Business, the Humanities, "The Body", Military, etc. The chosen fields of study combine with the character's four Potential Multipliers to influence the character's final Characteristic Ratings.

Universe's nine Characteristics are Strength, Endurance, Dexterity, Agility, Intelligence, Leadership, Aggression, Empathy (i. e. essentially "people skills"), and Mental Power (i.e. general willpower, although a very high Mental Power rating confers psionic abilities). Characteristic Ratings range in value from 1 to 12.

==== Professions ====
After choosing Fields of Study and determining Characteristics, the player chooses one of 23 Professions for the character. These include several military, scientific and technician professions, as well Diplomat, Interstellar Explorer or Trader, or Civil Inspector (a Federal auditor tasked with preventing private exploitation of developing colonies). Also available are such colorful professions as Space Pirate, Spy, Zero-G Miner, and Thinker (i.e. "member of the exclusive psionic community"). The player's choice of Profession influences which Skills may be chosen for the character.

The character's ultimate level of success upon leaving the Profession is given as a Benefit Level, which is influenced mainly by time in service. Higher Benefit Levels equate to higher Rank (e. g. Ensign, Scout Commodore, Constable), more Skill Points to "buy" higher Skill levels, and/or increasingly valuable cash totals, pensions, or equipment - including robots or even a spaceship in rare cases. Unlike its influential predecessor Traveller, in Universe career advancement is not an iterative process; the length of service and the final Benefit Level are both given by a one-time die roll/table lookup.

=== Skills, Task Resolution and Advancement ===
There are over 100 Skills in Universe, classed into the categories Military, Psionic, Vehicle/Spacecraft, Scientific, Tech (i.e. repair skills), Interpersonal, and Environmental. Each Skill lists a maximum level (usually 6 to 9) and a governing Characteristic for the skill. A character can never increase his skill level higher than his rating in the governing Characteristic (e. g. The skill "Teaching" is governed by the Empathy characteristic, so a character with an Empathy rating of 5 may achieve a maximum Teaching skill level of 5).

Environmental survival skills were notable for being arranged on a grid/table with an automatic decrease for less familiar environments (allowing for a mountaineer with arctic training to be unfamiliar with a valley in a jungle).

The rulebook entry for each Skill lays out every task for which the Skill may be used, along with the exact Base Chance of success for each task. For example, the Geology Skill lists 6 tasks, including scanning a sample to find abundant minerals (70% base chance) or trace minerals (30%), and scanning an area to find all 3 m-wide tunnels and fissures (50%) or all tunnels and fissures of any size (20%). This degree of specificity is in deliberate contrast to previous RPGs such as Traveller, whose vague Skill descriptions and GM-improvised situational die modifiers were (according to the Universe designers) a hardship for the Gamemaster (GM).

==== Task Resolution ====
When a character attempts to use the skill during play, the GM looks up the Base Chance, to which are added the Character's rating in the Skill's governing Characteristic plus the square of his Skill level. This yields the "modified chance", which the player must attempt to roll under using percentile dice (see summary below).

Base Chance + governing Characteristic rating + Skill level squared = Modified Chance

==== Degree of Success/Failure ====
For most skills in Universe, the numerical difference between the Modified Chance and the actual percentile die roll is used to quantify the degree of success (or failure). These levels of success/failure are not merely loose guidelines; rather, most skills include specific formulas or tables for converting the "Modified Chance vs die roll" difference into concrete effects.

For example, in using the Recruiting skill, rolling under the modified chance means the "excess" points are added point-for-point to the recruited NPC's Characteristics and Skill levels - potentially producing a very capable recruit. In using the Hyperjump Table, rolling over the modified chance leads to increasingly deleterious jump errors (in terms of distance from target point and neurological damage to the Hyperjumping psion).

==== Skill Advancement ====
Universe employs usage-based skill advancement. The only way for a character to increase their level in a given skill is to use that skill in play. Specifically, certain die results obtained when using a skill yield an experience point (EP) which may be assigned to that skill only. For frequently used skills (e. g. Firearms), the character receives an EP whenever a "0" appears on either of the percentile die when using the skill. For less frequently used skills (e. g. Disguise or Hyperjump Navigation), the EP is awarded whenever a 0, 1, 2, or 3 is rolled. The current EP total is noted on the Character Record sheet next to the Skill entry. Once the character has amassed a number of EPs equal to the current skill level plus one, the character gains the next skill level and the EP total for that skill is reset to zero. This skill increase happens immediately; the character does not have to wait for the end of the current play session (or some other arbitrary time period) in order to increase their skill level.

A character unskilled in a given skill may attain level 1 by amassing 8 EPs through use of the skill (in Universe unskilled characters may attempt most non-psionic skills). However, there is no method for increasing a character's Characteristic Ratings (Strength, Intelligence, etc.).

=== Spacecraft, Robots and Equipment ===
==== Equipment ====
Different levels of technological development are given as different "Civ Levels" from 1 to 8, corresponding to centuries of Earth's history, from 1600 to 2300. Thus a Civ Level 6 Geo Scanner is a 25 kg backpack-borne device that takes an hour to use, while the Civ Level 8 version is handheld at 7 kg, takes half as long to use, and additionally provides the user with a +2 to his/her Geology Skill level. A "portable business computer" weighs in at 10 kg.

Handheld laser weapons exist at higher Civ Levels, but they are not much more powerful than 20th Century projectile weapons. There are also stun-ray pistols and reasonably effective tranq-dart guns (both of which, if used against an alien with the wrong kind of body chemistry, can have wildly unpredictable effects).

==== Vehicles ====
Ground vehicles include a "Crawler" ATV that can use either wheels or telescoping legs, as well as the nuclear powered Mobile Lab - a three-section articulated menagerie-on-wheels. The "Amphibian" is a wheeled ATV that can travel over land and under water like a submarine.

Marine vehicles include a Flexi Craft, which uses "eel-like motion" to travel across the surface and the Reef Walker, which walks along the bottom of the sea on telescoping legs.

Air vehicles include the stereotypical turbine-powered flying car of the future; a 12 passenger, nuclear powered ornithopter; and low-altitude anti-grav flyers.

==== Robots ====
Robots take the form of several different chassis ranging in size from 45 to 1020 kg, which are customized by the installation of systems. Different chassis have different hardware and software capacities ("points"); the systems take up increasingly more of these chassis points as the systems increase in power and sophistication. For example, a Spacecraft Tech repair system takes up 3 Hardware Points and 1 Software Point. Certain systems either allow the robot to perform a specific skill (e.g. repair, weapons, pilot, close attack, language translation) or, if assisting a human, increase the human's effective skill level. Other systems feature a specific piece of equipment (grenade launcher, jet pack, force field generator, mining system). Still other, more "software point"-intensive systems enhance a robot's basic AI, some even allowing it to spontaneously offer high-level analyses and learn from experience (i.e. earn EPs through skill use like a human character).

==== Spacecraft ====
Spacecraft travel within a star system using fission engines fueled by "radioactives", which generally must be purchased at starports. The rule book supplies formulas for computing travel times between planets given different levels of constant acceleration/deceleration from 1g to 5g.

Travel between star systems is accomplished by means of an onboard psion character using a hyperjump "engine". The hyperjump is instantaneous and uses no fuel, but it can be initiated only after the spacecraft has traveled far away from the gravity fields of the system's sun and planets. Also, the further away the target star system, the greater the probability of a potentially catastrophic misjump - especially if the psion is not highly skilled in hyperjump navigation. Another limitation is that all but the most expensive hyperjump engines become "unstable" and must be replaced after a few jumps (at significant expense).

Starship design consists of choosing from 13 basic spacecraft hulls and then adding interchangeable modules, or pods. A given hull type has a specific pod capacity and distinct characteristics regarding performance and combat (i.e. a particular mix of fission-drive engine, armor, force field and basic weapons). The hulls range from a small two-person spacefighter (high performance but too small to accommodate any pods) up to ponderous, 12-pod cargo-transport or heavy cruiser hulls. There are 23 types of pods, including Heavy Weapons, Luxury Cabin, Tractor Beam, Augmented Hyperjump, Bio-Research, Buffered Cargo, and the BattleCraft Pod (containing a spacefighter).

Rules for combat between spacecraft are presented in a separate tactical-level space combat boardgame, SPI's DeltaVee.

=== World Generation ===
World Generation in Universe is a three-step iterative process where each step adds a layer of detail to the star system being generated. This approach was the result of co-developer Gerard Christopher Klug's experience as a Traveller referee. Klug tired of making his players wait for him to complete the entire protracted Traveller system generation process each time they hyperjumped into a new system. Thus, while a Universe star system can be generated down to the smallest detail before play (using all 17 tables in the World Generation chapter), the process is designed to also allow the appropriate level of detail to be generated ad hoc during a play session.

==== Star System ====
The first step of the process allows the GM to, in a matter of minutes, populate the star system with several adventure-worthy planets and moons of specific size, position and "type" (the "Planet Type" is a rough gauge of the habitability of the world; either Earthlike, Tolerable, or Hostile.)

==== Geographical Features ====
If the players wish to approach a planet from the system's jump point, the next step guides the GM in generating the physical features of the planet; atmosphere, temperature, distribution of water bodies, mountains, deserts, etc. The "Planet Type" (Earthlike, Hostile, etc.) is now used to extrapolate details such as the mean temperature and the atmosphere classification (e. g. Thin, Normal, Contaminated, Corrosive) - although the actual chemical composition of the atmosphere is not specified. At this point, the GM can produce a map of the world using the appropriately sized World Log from the rulebook. Provision is also made for mapping a 4,000 km by 4,000 km region of the world (if the GM desires) on a hexmap with a scale of 100 km per hex.

==== Population and Technology ====
The third step (if required) is to determine the details of human settlement; i. e. the Civ Level, Starport Class, world population and settlement status (from "Major State" of 3 billion people to "Subsidized Working Colony" to "Explored and Abandoned"). The Settlement Status is strongly influenced by the system's distance from Earth. This step also details the placement of resources, from Arable Land and Edible Game to Exotic Spices, Copper and Germanium. A world's resource profile will influence (among other things) the purchase price of equipment and vehicles on the world.

=== Encounters ===
A significant portion of the rule book concerns guiding the GM in generating Random encounters with non-player characters (NPCs) or alien creatures. Many calculations and references are required both before and during combat; the sheer number of which compelled even an otherwise enthusiastic reviewer to deem the encounter rules "dense, slow, and... just about useless".

Three times per game day, the GM rolls on the Encounter Table and the Terrain Effects chart, and then (if an encounter is indicated) uses the results to modify rolls on subsequent tables. Many factors go into these calculations; the natural surroundings and local population density, the Aggression rating of the resulting creature or NPC, the Terrain Value (a measure of the availability of cover), the visibility of the player character's (PC's) weapons, etc. Also, the GM must determine which PC has the highest chance of spotting the encounter by taking into account each PC's combat experience and familiarity with the surrounding terrain type.

These die rolls and table references eventually result in the exact placement of all involved entities on the Tactical Display combat hexmap as well as the disposition of the NPCs/Creature. This process could result in anything from, for example, the PCs catching sight of a herd of herbivores grazing obliviously 200m away to, say, a camouflaged alien creature reaching out from a crevice to ensnare an unsuspecting PC. Or, in a city or spaceport, it could mean being accosted by suspicious Federal authorities or approached by a patron (or perhaps a very convincing con man). Alternatively, the Encounter Table might yield an Accident, i.e. a random event like a spacesuit leak, or the PC's Mobile Lab ATV encountering quicksand or their robot suddenly going berserk. (These randomly generated Accidents serve to add suspense to the game and also afford players the chance to increase their character's levels in skill such as Driving and Tech Repair).

==== NPC and Creature Descriptions ====
The "Adventure Guide" section of the Universe rule book provides dozens of pre-made NPC and creature encounters.

For NPCs, each entry lists the NPC's characteristics, skills, and possessions along with the "First Description" (the PC's first impression of the NPC). Following this is the "GM's Description", a more detailed disclosure of the NPC's motives and responses to likely PC actions.

Compared to the NPC encounter entries, the Creature descriptions are much more methodical. Each of the creature entries includes a progression of four increasingly detailed descriptions. Each successive level of detail is disclosed only when certain criteria are met, such as the PC party winning the combat initiative die roll, or a Biologist's successful "Perception" skill die roll.

- Warning: a corner-of-the-eye, initial hint that something is afoot (this all that is initially disclosed if the encounter begins with the creature having the combat Initiative. For high-Aggression creatures, the Warning is often a description of the creature's surprise assault on the nearest PC.)
- Sight: the PC's first good look at the creature (this is how the encounter begins if the PC party has combat Initiative in the first round). The PCs may not attack the creature until the Sight description is read.
- Perception: preliminary assessment by a trained Biologist (or Psion with "Life Sense" skill), after observing the creature's appearance and behavior
- Examination: an exhaustive biological exam/scan on a restrained or dead creature

Each successive description reveals information about the creature which the PCs might find interesting, tactically helpful, or potentially profitable. In this way, otherwise abstract skills like Biology and psionic Life Sense are integrated directly and meaningfully into the play experience.

In addition to the lists of pre-generated creatures, there are rules that guide the GM in creating new creatures. This process essentially consists of deciding on a basic creature type and then picking from several listed creature powers (e. g. Reflective Carapace, Energy Ingestion, Swarm Mind, Telekinesis), for which rules mechanics are given. The Universe rule book provides no illustrations of any creatures. Also, there are no rules for ecological coherence or for fitting creatures into foodchains or ecosystems. Such concerns are completely subordinated to the goal of presenting a varied array of fantastic lifeforms as one-off monsters or research subjects.

=== Combat ===
Combat in Universe is divided into 15-second Action Rounds and is represented on the "Tactical Display" hex map with a scale of 5 meters per hex.

==== Initiative and Willpower Checks ====
The first step in an Action Round is determine which side in the conflict has the Initiative; the side that wins the Initiative die roll acts first in the Action Round. Creatures have a simple Initiative total listed in their rulebook entry. For human characters, Initiative is a d10 roll modified by the party leader's Leadership Characteristic, his Battlefield skill level, and his Environ skill level for the appropriate terrain type. (The party leader is whoever has the highest such total at the moment).

Winning the Initiative die roll is important not only because the winning side gets to go first in the Action Round, but also because the losing side is subject to willpower checks. After all characters on the side with Initiative have acted, any character on the side without Initiative who was fired at - even if not hit - must make a d10 roll against his Aggression and Mental Power ratings and his Battlefield skill level. If he fails the willpower check, the only action the fired-upon character may take is to either cower helplessly on the ground or go berserk and charge his assailant, firing at the maximum rate of fire (the exact action is a function of his Aggression rating, not player choice). Thus, unit cohesion can disintegrate in a firefight if the leader is inexperienced, in unfamiliar terrain, or lacking in force of character.

Characters engaged in close combat with each other check Initiative separate from their parties.

==== The Weapon Chart and the Hit Table ====
The Weapon Chart that lists each weapon's Base Hit Chance at various ranges and its Hit Strength (a measure of the damage it inflicts). The "to hit" calculation follows the standard Universe skill calculation: Base Hit Chance (from the Weapon Chart) plus Dexterity rating plus the square of specific weapon Skill level. There are additional modifiers for the actions of the firer and target and for the Terrain Value (default natural cover). If the firer rolls less than this modified chance, the target is hit.

Upon achieving a hit, the firing character adds a d10 die roll to the Hit Strength of the weapon. He refers to the "Hit Table" to convert this total into losses to the target's Strength, Dexterity, Agility, and/or Endurance (damage comes directly out of the character's physical Characteristics; there is no separate pool of "Hit Points"). A character who takes damage passes out for two Action Rounds unless he passes a shock check against his Mental Power rating. If the hit results in Endurance being reduced to zero, the character immediately passes out until healing brings Endurance above zero. If both Strength and Endurance are reduced to zero, the character dies.

The Hit Table has separate columns for unarmored characters/creatures, armored characters/creatures, and equipment. The "Equipment Damage" column converts hit points into levels of equipment damage, e. g. Superficial, Light, Heavy, Partially Destroyed, etc. This damage level affects the repair time and base chance of repairing the damage as detailed in the appropriate Tech skill.

== History ==
The first official mention of Universe was a game proposal in the "Feedback" (market-research survey) section of Ares #4 (September 1980). Universe was proposed as "the ultimate science-fiction role-playing game [which] will do for the stars and the future what our acclaimed DragonQuest has done for the worlds of fantasy". It would sell for $10.

Universe was released in March 1981 as a boxed set. It includes the 76-page Gamemasters' Guide the 24-page Adventure Guide (compilation of sample encounters with NPCs and Creature), and the large Interstellar Display star map, as well as DeltaVee, a separate tactical space combat board game.

In Issue #12 of Ares (January 1982), SPI included the pull-out board game Star Trader, a standalone game of interstellar trading that is compatible with Universe. SPI also released the second edition of Universe in 1982. Although it contained no substantive rule changes, it consolidated the GameMaster's Guide and the Adventure Guide into a single softbound volume with the Interstellar Display as an insert. DeltaVee was not included; instead it was sold separately as a standalone game.

Just as the second edition was released, SPI was unexpectedly taken over by role-playing game publisher TSR. For a time, TSR continued to publish Universe and Ares, and two Universe related articles appeared in Ares:

- "Mongoose and Cobra", a Universe adventure scenario for 4 to 7 players. (Ares #17, Spring 1983)
- "First Contacts", a supplement for Universe introducing the Sh'k'tlp, an intelligent race of shape-changing, oviparous aliens. (Ares Special Edition #1, Summer 1983)

Ares was eventually folded into TSR's Dragon magazine as the "Ares Section", which included a Q&A column about Universe titled "Star Questions". The final column appeared in the July 1984 issue of Dragon as TSR ended production of Universe in favor of their own science-fiction role-playing game, Star Frontiers.

== Reception ==
In an October 1981 review in The Space Gamer #44, SPI game designer Greg Costikyan called the game "an excellent RPG from the stand-point of role-playing as it stood three years ago." But he pointed out that role-playing rules had advanced, and Universe was now "dated; moreover in important respects, it is scientifically inaccurate." Costikyan found various aspects of the game good, but disliked the touted world generation system, calling it "unrealistic, unsatisfying, time-consuming, and overly random." Although he found the rules well-written and well-indexed, he concluded that he was "rather disappointed with the game".

In Issue 51 of the British wargaming magazine Perfidious Albion, Charles Vasey noted, "The Gamesmasters' Guide is vast and contains much of what one would expect. An Adventure Guide contains lots of details and some creatures and NPCS, plus an adventure. This allows one to go straight into action (it seems)."

Steve List reviewed Universe for Different Worlds magazine and stated that "Universe is a far cry from what Traveller is now, but given the same time for development of background and publication of supplementary material, it could easily equal Traveller in its richness. However, it will always be a slower game to play."

In the November 1981 issue of Dragon (before TSR's takeover of SPI), Jeff Swycaffer admired the four-color star map, calling it "striking." He also liked the character generation system, "the most complex and complete character-generation system that role-playing has yet developed." The one thing Swycaffer didn't like about the character generation system was "the standard SPI obsession with play balance. For every advantage and bonus a character is given, there is a corresponding disadvantage." Swycaffer also found the Character Action rules to be "dense, slow, and for referees without a computer, just about useless." In comparison to rival science fiction game Traveller Swycaffer believed that "Universe, in what it offers, is superior." He concluded with a strong recommendation, saying, "In time, with proper supplementation of its own (SPI has great plans for add-on elements), it has promise of becoming far more. Buy it."

== Other reviews and commentary ==
- Grenadier #14
- American Wargamer Vol 9 #4

== See also ==
- Universe Primer
