= Enchanted Wood =

Enchanted Wood may refer to:

- The Enchanted Wood, fictional place located in the Dreamlands in H. P. Lovecraft's Dream Cycle
- The Enchanted Wood, the first book in Enid Blyton's The Faraway Tree series
- The Enchanted Wood (DragonQuest), a role-playing game adventure
