= Starsilver Trek =

Tabletop role-playing game adventure

- Publishers: Judges Guild
- Publication: 1982; 44 years ago
- Genres: Fantasy
- Systems: Custom

Starsilver Trek is a 1982 fantasy role-playing game adventure published by Judges Guild for DragonQuest.

== Contents ==
Starsilver Trek is an adventure in which a party of dwarf player characters go on a quest to the Frontiers of Alusia.

== Reception ==
David McCorkhill reviewed Starsilver Trek in The Space Gamer No. 62. McCorkhill commented that "DQ could use more ordinary adventures just as Alusia could use the detail provided here. Even if you never run the particular quest described here, even if you never had a dwarf in your party, the old grouch who hates other players saying 'Beam me up, Scotty' during a fantasy adventure is the only one who'll not have fun with these encounters."
