= Jessica Utts =

American statistician

- Born: 1952 (age 73–74)
- Education: Binghamton University; Pennsylvania State University
- Known for: Statistics education textbooks; evaluation of remote viewing research
- Awards: Fellow of the American Statistical Association; Fellow of the Institute of Mathematical Statistics; ASA Founders Award (2009); Samuel S. Wilks Memorial Award (2022)
- Scientific career
- Fields: Statistics, statistics education, parapsychology
- Workplaces: University of California, Davis; University of California, Irvine; SRI International
- Thesis: Robust, nonparametric estimation of multivariate location (1978)
- Doctoral advisor: Thomas P. Hettmansperger

Jessica Utts (born 1952) is an American statistician and statistics educator. She is a professor of statistics at the University of California, Irvine, where she was chair of the Department of Statistics, and previously was a faculty member at the University of California, Davis. She is known for her textbooks on statistics, her work in statistics education, and her involvement in statistical evaluations of remote viewing and other parapsychology research.

== Early life and education ==
Utts entered the State University of New York at Binghamton at age 17 and initially planned to major in mathematics. During her sophomore year she added psychology as a second major, and in her junior year took courses in statistics and mathematical models in psychology that led her toward statistics as a field combining the two interests.

She attended graduate school in statistics at Pennsylvania State University. Her dissertation research extended work by Peter J. Bickel on robust, nonparametric estimation of multivariate location. According to the Mathematics Genealogy Project, she received her Ph.D. from Penn State in 1978 under Thomas P. Hettmansperger.

== Career ==
After completing her doctorate, Utts joined the University of California, Davis. She has described choosing Davis because the campus was organizing a new statistics department; after spending her first year in the mathematics department, she became one of the founding members of the UC Davis statistics unit. At Davis she taught a wide range of statistics courses, including large introductory statistics courses and graduate service courses for students in fields such as psychology and veterinary science.

Utts later moved to the University of California, Irvine. In 2014 she was professor and chair of statistics at UCI. She was elected the 111th president of the American Statistical Association (ASA), serving in 2016.

== Statistics education ==
Utts has written extensively about what non-specialists should learn from introductory statistics. In a 2003 article in The American Statistician, she argued that college statistics courses should give greater attention to interpreting statistical information in scientific studies and public reporting, including issues such as the distinction between correlation and causation.

Her textbook Seeing Through Statistics was written for students whose main need was to become informed consumers of statistical information rather than technical producers of statistical analyses. In the 2014 Journal of Statistics Education interview, Utts said the book grew out of her view that a first statistics course should emphasize ideas that students could use in daily life and in their careers. She also co-authored Mind on Statistics with Robert F. Heckard, incorporating the conceptual approach of Seeing Through Statistics together with formulas and technical material expected in many introductory courses.

During her campaign for ASA president, Utts said that many of her goals for the association were related to broad statistics education, including connecting ASA with high-school AP Statistics teachers and improving public understanding of statistics through media training and outreach.

== Investigation of remote viewing ==
Utts became involved in parapsychology research after receiving tenure at UC Davis, during a sabbatical year in the Statistics Department at Stanford University. She has said that she was looking for research directions that used both her statistical training and her background in psychology, and that discussions with Persi Diaconis and contact with the Society for Scientific Exploration led to her later work in the area. She subsequently spent a year as a visiting scientist at SRI International, working on classified government-funded parapsychology research.

In 1995, the American Institutes for Research appointed a panel consisting primarily of Utts and psychologist Ray Hyman to evaluate the Stargate Project, a United States government program that had investigated remote viewing for intelligence applications and had been funded by the Central Intelligence Agency and Defense Intelligence Agency.

Utts concluded that the program's statistical results supported the existence of psychic functioning. Hyman agreed that statistically significant effects appeared in the data but argued that Utts's conclusion was premature, emphasizing possible methodological problems and lack of independent replication. The project was terminated in 1995 after reviewers concluded that remote viewing had not been shown to be useful for intelligence operations. Critics including David Marks have also argued that Utts's prior publications with remote-viewing researcher Edwin May raised questions about her independence as an evaluator.

Utts has continued to write about parapsychology and statistical issues in studies of alleged psi phenomena. She has also served on the executive board of the International Remote Viewing Association.

== Awards and honors ==
Utts is a Fellow of the American Statistical Association and a Fellow of the Institute of Mathematical Statistics. In 2009 she received the ASA Founders Award, which recognizes distinguished service to the association. She received the Samuel S. Wilks Memorial Award from the ASA in 2022.

== Selected publications ==
=== Books ===
- Utts, Jessica (2015). Seeing Through Statistics (4th ed.). Cengage Learning. ISBN 9781285050881.
- Utts, Jessica; Heckard, Robert F. (2015). Mind on Statistics (5th ed.). Cengage Learning. ISBN 9781285463186.
- Utts, Jessica; Heckard, Robert F. (2006). Statistical Ideas and Methods. Cengage Learning. ISBN 9780534421298.

=== Papers ===
- Utts, Jessica (1988). "Successful replication versus statistical significance". Journal of Parapsychology. 52 (4): 305–320.
- Utts, Jessica (1991). "Replication and meta-analysis in parapsychology". Statistical Science. 6 (4): 363–403.
- Utts, Jessica (2003). "What educated citizens should know about statistics and probability". The American Statistician. 57 (2): 74–79.
- Utts, Jessica; Sommer, Barbara; Acredolo, Curtis; Maher, Michael W.; Matthews, H. Robert (2003). "A study comparing traditional and hybrid Internet-based instruction in introductory statistics classes". Journal of Statistics Education. 11 (3).
- Utts, Jessica (2010). Unintentional lies in the media: Don't blame journalists for what we don't teach (PDF). Eighth International Conference on Teaching Statistics.
- Utts, Jessica (2018). "An Assessment of the Evidence for Psychic Functioning". Journal of Parapsychology. 82 (Supplement): 118–146. doi:10.30891/jopar.2018S.01.10. S2CID 3664988.
