= The Blade of Allectus =

Tabletop role-playing game supplement

- Publishers: Simulations Publications
- Publication: 1980; 45 years ago
- Genres: Fantasy
- Systems: Custom

The Blade of Allectus is a 1980 fantasy role-playing game adventure for DragonQuest published by Simulations Publications, Inc.

== Contents ==
The Blade of Allectus is an adventure in which a duke has vanished mysteriously, believed to have been captured by the inhabitants of a magic island.

== Reception ==
Ron Pehr reviewed The Blade of Allectus in The Space Gamer No. 40. Pehr commented that "The Blade of Allectus should be judged on what it does - provides an exciting time for all. It you use DragonQuest rules, The Blade of Allectus should please you."
