= The Palace of Ontoncle =

The Palace of Ontoncle is a 1980 role-playing game adventure published by Simulations Publications for DragonQuest.

== Plot summary ==
The Palace of Ontoncle is an adventure in which the player characters undertake a perilous mission into a ruined palace, where the objective is to confront and destroy an evil magician.

== Publication history ==
The Palace of Ontoncle was written by Peter Herzig with a cover by Matthew Quayle and published by Simulations Publications in 1981 as a 24-page book.
