= Gerry Klug =

American game designer

- Born: Gerard Christopher Klug
- Occupation: Game designer

Gerard Christopher Klug is an American game designer who has worked primarily on role-playing games.

== Career ==
Trained as a theatrical lighting designer, Gerry (Chris) Klug worked on Broadway, Off-Broadway, regional theater, opera, and toured with various 1970s rock bands. He won two New Jersey Critic's Circle Awards for lighting designs at the New Jersey Theater Forum.

Klug then began writing adventures for Simulations Publications's line of role-playing games. He assisted with the design of Universe, Horror Hotel, Damocles Mission, and the second edition of DragonQuest. Klug and Robert Kern discussed creating an espionage role-playing game while working as designers at SPI; after SPI was purchased by TSR in 1982, eight SPI employees quit and Avalon Hill hired them to form their Victory Games subsidiary. Klug began working on his espionage design again, and when Victory Games acquired a James Bond license the game became James Bond 007 (1983). For a time, he was also design director for Victory Games. Jennell Jaquays, (Note: Credited as Paul Jaquays.) with David J. Ritchie and Klug, designed the adventure The Shattered Statue (1988) for Dungeons & Dragons, although the adventure was also compatible with DragonQuest.

Klug then began a career in the computer game field, with his credits including Star Trek DS9: Dominion Wars, Europa Universalis, Diamond Dreams Baseball, and Aidyn Chronicles: First Mage. From 2001 through 2004, Klug served as creative director for EA's MMORPG, Earth & Beyond. Klug was the creative director for Stargate Worlds and the creative consultant for Stargate: Resistance.
