= DragonQuest Gamesmaster's Screen =

DragonQuest Gamesmaster's Screen is a 1980 role-playing game supplement published by Simulations Publications for DragonQuest.

== Contents ==
DragonQuest Gamesmaster's Screen is a supplement in which gamemaster's screen is paired with the first edition rules.

== Publication history ==
Gamesmaster's Screen was published by Simulations Publications in 1981 as a cardstock screen.
