= The Shattered Statue =

Dungeons & Dragons adventure module

- Code: DQ1
- TSR product code: 9221
- Authors: Jennell Jaquays (Note: Credited as Paul Jaquays.) with David J. Ritchie and Gerry Klug
- First published: February 1988

The Shattered Statue is an adventure module published in 1988 for the Advanced Dungeons & Dragons fantasy role-playing game.

== Plot summary ==
The Shattered Statue is a Forgotten Realms adventure scenario in which the player characters have been hired to find the pieces of a broken ancient statue so that it can be reassembled and reanimated.

This adventure was designed for Advanced Dungeons & Dragons but is also compatible with DragonQuest and includes new magic rules for that game.

== Publication history ==
DQ1 The Shattered Statue was written by Jennell Jaquays with David J. Ritchie and Gerry Klug, with a cover by Daniel Horne and interior illustrations by Jaquays, and was published by TSR in 1988 as a 48-page booklet with an outer folder.
