= Heroes and Villians (DragonQuest) =

Heroes and Villians is a 1982 role-playing game supplement published by Judges Guild for DragonQuest.

== Contents ==
Heroes and Villians is a supplement in which a gamemaster's resource features illustrated lists of pregenerated characters, along with descriptive settings for an inn and a hideout. It is set within the Frontiers of Alusia.

== Publication history ==
Heroes and Villians was written by Edward R.G. Mortimer and published by Judges Guild in 1982 as a 48-page book.
