= Magebird Quest =

Magebird Quest is a 1982 role-playing game adventure published by Judges Guild for DragonQuest.

== Plot summary ==
Magebird Quest is an adventure in which a scenario designed for beginning player characters follows a journey to the rugged peaks of the Rookeries. It includes detailed maps of several inns and taverns, as well as maps of two sailing boats scaled for use with miniatures. The adventure is set within the Frontiers of Alusia.

== Publication history ==
Magebird Quest was written by Dave Sering and published by Judges Guild in 1982 as a 64-page book.
