= Universe Primer =

Universe Primer is a 2003 role-playing game supplement published by Tower Ravens for Universe the Sci-Fi RPG.

== Contents ==
Universe Primer is a supplement in which an introductory rulebook for Universe, The Sci‑Fi RPG presents a skill‑based d% system set in the Vortis Massif of the Antwaris Galaxy, where human empires and alien species vie along contested boundaries.

== Reviews ==
- Pyramid
- Backstab
