= List of Kaamelott episodes =

These are the episodes of the French TV series Kaamelott.

All episodes are written and directed by Alexandre Astier unless otherwise noted.

Each season is referred to as a Book (Livre). Books I-IV are divided, in the DVD version, into two Volumes (Tomes). Each Volume corresponds to a physical DVD. For the earlier seasons, single-disk Volumes were issued separately and this publication was followed by a Complete or Collector's Edition (Édition Intégrale) which includes an Addendum of other material.

The order of the episodes on the Complete DVD edition differs from the broadcast order, and may be assumed to be the director's preferred order. The list below gives precedence to the Collector's Edition (Intégrale) DVD order.

The primary notation here is a three-part number (Book.Vol.Episode) which indicates DVD order using a Roman cap for the Book, Roman lowercase for the Volume, and Arabic numeral for the Episode. For Book V, the numbering is somewhat different.

The French Wikipédia currently lists all the episodes, 1 through 459, in broadcast order. In the list below, the broadcast order within each Book is indicated by a two-part number (Book-Episode) in parentheses.

== List of episodes ==
* = original title definitely refers to the title of a well-known film.

=== Pilot episodes ===
These episodes are considered to be pilots or experimental episodes. Only two pilot episodes were broadcast, The Map and Family Meal. All the pilots are included on the Addendum disk for Book I, so they are numbered I.A. to indicate this disk.

I.A.1 - (0-0) : Dies irae (Dies iræ) "Day of Wrath" (name of a section of a Requiem Mass, and a famous Latin hymn). Original 14-minute festival film.
A session of the Round Table. Arthur is exasperated to find that, although proceedings are conducted partly in Latin, none of the knights knows Latin. The knights complain about their boring diet and ask for more green vegetables. Bohort proposes that, since the original Grail is so difficult to find, they commission one from a silversmith.
I.A.2 - (0-1) : Duel (Le Duel)
Arthur and Guinièvre become bored watching an endless fight between armored knights on foot. Eventually Arthur and his wife go to bed.
I.A.3 - (0-2) : Viking Invasion (L'Invasion Viking)
A pleasant spring day at Kaamelott is interrupted by a pair of Vikings, who are satisfied with minimal booty.
I.A.4 - (0-3) : The Pitched Battle (La Bataille Rangée)
Arthur and his knights observe and try to control their army from the sidelines. Merlin tries a fireball.
I.A.5 - (0-4) : Perceval's Romance (La Romance de Perceval)
Perceval and a young woman attempt to flirt but are not very good at it.
I.A.6 - (0-5) : The Funeral Of Ulfin (Les Funérailles D'Ulfin)
An attempt is made to ritually immolate the corpse of an older lord (Ygerne's contemporary), but he awakens and is still full of dirty jokes.
I.A.7 - (0-6) : The Female Knight (Le Chevalier Femme)
The new knight at the Round Table is a girl, but she wins acceptance. An envoy of the Pope arouses the knights' temper.
I.A.8 - (0-7) : Family Meal (Le Repas de Famille)
Arthur, Guinièvre, and her parents do not enjoy dinner together.
I.A.9 - (0-8) : The Map (La Carte)
Perceval attempts to understand how a map represents the field of battle and the locations of the enemies.
I.A.10 - (0-9) : The Repurgator (Le Répurgateur) – cf. Warhammer gaming and roleplay
A "Witchsmeller" character, representative of the Roman Church, tries to condemn Perceval and Karadoc for allegedly using magic. Arthur points out to him that Excailbur is magic and has him burned at the stake instead.
I.A.11 - (0-10): The Maze (Le Labyrinthe)
The Lady of the Lake explains to Arthur how to find a wonderful treasure in an underground labyrinth. Her directions do not prove very useful.

=== Book I ===
Broadcast from January 3, 2005 to March, 2005 in France. Broadcast order is lost, so the only order available is the DVD order, which includes 2 volumes of 50 episodes each. They are numbered I.i.1 or I.ii.1 etc. Parenthetical numbers refer to the broadcast order.

I.i.1 (1-1) : Heat (Heat)*
Arthur, Léodagan and Perceval are isolated in a forest during a battle. Perceval proposes foolish but elaborate ways out, eventually driving Arthur to beat him up at the risk of betraying their position.
I.i.2 (1-2) : Blueberry Pie (Les Tartes Aux Myrtilles)
Arthur's mother-in-law Séli baked a blueberry pie (inedible), which allows her to raise the question of why Arthur and Guinièvre have not yet given her a grandchild for whom to bake pies.
I.i.3 (1-3) : Breccan's Table (La Table de Breccan)
The craftsman Breccan (Yvan Le Bolloc'h) has just finished building the Round Table, as specified by Arthur and the Lady of the Lake. They are optimistic about its use, though concerned about keeping it clean.
I.i.4 (1-4) The Mystery Knight (Le Chevalier Mystère)
The knights at the Round Table discuss the mysterious Sir Provençal the Gaul (Gaulois). He is in fact their own comrade Perceval the Welshman (Gallois), who is not capable of giving his own name without making a mistake.
I.i.5 (1-5) : The Scourge of God (Le Fléau de Dieu) – cf. Attila the Hun
Arthur, Léodagan, and Bohort are confronted by Attila the Hun, who demands booty. He begins by wanting all the gold in Kaamelott, or all the linens, but ends up satisfied with less.
I.i.6 (1-6) : The Bodyguard (Le Garde Du Corps)
As the signing of an important peace treaty draws near, a bodyguard, Grüdu, is assigned to Arthur. Grüdu accompanies him everywhere, including to the beds he shares with his mistresses and his wife, and threatens to kill anyone who touches him.
I.i.7 (1-7) : World News (Des Nouvelles Du Monde)
Guenièvre and her mother Séli have hired a bard, Buzit (Didier Bénureau), to entertain the family at dinner. Arthur and Léodagan are frustrated, since Buzit's songs include potentially interesting information but Buzit himself cannot explain his lyrics.
I.i.8 (1-8) : Codes and Strategies (Codes Et Strategies)
Arthur and his generals watch a battle from the hillside, attempting to signal the appropriate moves to their troops. The troops, however, do not follow the signals or the orders.
I.i.9 (1-9) : The Master Of Arms (Le Maitre d'armes)
Arthur works out with his Master of Arms, in swordplay and insults.
I.i.10 (1-10): The Diplomat (Le Négociateur)
Bohort negotiates peace with the barbarians by ceding them the marshes that surround Kaamelott, believing he has solved security problems.
I.i.11 (1-11): Dinner Dance (Dîner dansant)
Yvain, Guenièvre's younger brother, would rather eat dinner with his buddy Gauvain than with his family.
I.i.12 (1-12): The Sixth Sense (Le Sixième Sens)*
The Lady of the Lake foresees a great destiny for Perceval and Karadoc, who cannot accept or understand why they can't see her.
I.i.13 (1-13): Arthur and the Question (Arthur et la question)
The question is torture. Léodagan and Calogrenant have Venec show the reluctant Arthur a series of mechanical options for getting criminals and spies to confess.
I.i.14 (1-14): Monogamous (Monogame)
The Répurgateur (Élie Semoun) tries to get Arthur to sign a law forbidding polygamy. Since Arthur is a practicing polygamist....
I.i.15 (1-15): Merlin's Challenges (Les Défis de Merlin)
Élias de Kelliwic'h appears at court with demands. Merlin attempts to challenge him but does not come off very well.
I.i.16 (1-16): The Chieftains' Banquet (Le Banquet des chefs)
Will the upcoming banquet be catered by Bohort with fruit baskets, or by Venec with dancing girls and large quantities of roast pig?
I.i.17 (1-17): The Sign (Le Signe)
Writer: Fabien Rault. Arthur tries to get Merlin to explain the dead crow he found near his door.
I.i.18 (1-18): Very Like a Grail (En Forme de Graal)
Is the Grail, object of the Round Table knights' quest, a cup, a dish, or a sparkling stone? --cf. Holy_grail#Conceptions_of_the_Grail.
I.i.19 (1-19): Warrior's Rest (Le Repos du guerrier)
The court notices that Arthur is usually in a pleasant mood after sleeping with Demetra, but is grouchy after a night in Guinièvre's bed.
I.i.20 (1-20): The Shark's Tooth (La Dent de requin)
Merlin is trying to work a spell on the battlefield, but needs a shark's tooth. Perceval and Karadoc are sent back to get it, but stop at the tavern on the way....
I.i.21 (1-21): The Military Tax (La Taxe militaire)
Lord Jacca (Georges Beller) has to decide whether to support Kaamelott financially or by fighting.
I.i.22 (1-22): The Scorpion's Tail (La Queue du scorpion)
Grüdu hears that the Roman Emperor was assassinated by a scorpion in his bed, and resolves to be particularly vigilant about Arthur's beds.
I.i.23 (1-23): Fertility Potion (La Potion de fécondité)
Séli gets a fertility potion from Merlin, for Arthur and Guinièvre, in the hopes of getting an heir to the throne. It just gives Arthur a headache.
I.i.24 (1-24): The Interpreter (L'Interprète)
The Burgundian king brings an interpreter (Lorant Deutsch) who tries to give Arthur helpful advice on defeating the Burgundians.
I.i.25 (1-25): The Sacrifice (Le Sacrifice)
Elias says that the howling of wolves requires human sacrifice—specifically, the queen. Arthur, Léodagan, and Lancelot discuss this but refuse.
I.i.26 (1-26): À la Volette (À la volette)--title of a children's song
Arthur can't get that song out of his head—even during diplomatic or strategic meetings.
I.i.27 (1-27): Back From Judaea (De Retour de Judée)
Dagonet returns from the Holy Land with souvenirs and gifts for everybody. He almost found out where the Grail is, too.
I.i.28 (1-28): A Kick up Your Sleeve (La Botte secrète)
Karadoc teaches Perceval a "secret move" in conversations where one does not understand what is being said: "That's not false." Perceval gets in trouble with it, especially with his lady friend, Guenièvre's maid Angharad.
I.i.29 (1-29): A Murderer in Kaamelott (L'Assassin de Kaamelott)
Who is killing people at night in Kaamelott? Just Grüdu.
I.i.30 (1-30): Three Of Hearts (Le Trois de Coeur)
Arthur has to share a bed with Demetra and Guenièvre; Demetra is trying to help Arthur's wife get some attention.
I.i.31 (1-31): Higher Fungi (Basidiomycètes) – cf. Basidiomycota
Problems with a mushroom omelette on the battlefield.
I.i.32 (1-32): The Impostor (L'Imposteur)
Arthur has Elias go over Merlin's laboratory to verify that it is as it should be.
I.i.33 (1-33): Roommates (Compagnons de chambrée)
Arthur, returning from a trip, is surprised to have to share a bed with Bishop Boniface (Marcel Philippot). They discuss social and moral issues, especially homosexuality.
I.i.34 (1-34): St. Patrick's Purgatory (La Grotte de Padraig)-- cf. St. Patrick's Purgatory
A quest from the Lady of the Lake to kill a monster in an underground maze.
I.i.35 (1-35): Ambidextrous (Ambidextrie)
Perceval, when being briefed on a battle plan, insists that not only left and right but the compass points are relative.
I.i.36 (1-36): Budget (Raison d'argent)
Venec proposes refilling Kaamelott's coffers with counterfeit coins.
I.i.37 (1-37): Lancelot's Romance (La Romance de Lancelot)
Lancelot is in love with Guinièvre. He tells her he has a friend in love with his lord's wife and asks for advice. She says there is just one thing to do. Lancelot goes with drawn sword to kill Arthur in his bath. When he sees the king in the tub, he comes to himself and makes up an explanation. See V.8.7 "The Underground River."
I.i.38 (1-38): Merlin And The Wolves (Merlin et les loups)
Merlin is more interested in helping a wounded wolf bitch than in helping Arthur win a battle.
I.i.39 (1-39): The Case of Yvain (Le Cas Yvain)
Arthur, Séli, and Léodagan discuss the problem of Yvain, who is an all-around slacker.
I.i.40 (1-40): The Dubbing (L'Adoubement)
Writer: Fabien Rault. Perceval is not sure whether he has ever been formally made a knight. Arthur dubs him quick and dirty, just to be sure.
I.i.41 (1-41): Arthur and the Dark (Arthur et les ténèbres)
An underground quest. Léodagan knows Arthur doesn't like the dark and wants to upset him; Bohort gets Merlin to make a night-vision potion.
I.i.42 (1-42): Zoomorphic (Le Zoomorphe)
Merlin transforms himself into a cat, a spider...
I.i.43 (1-43): Madenn's Ladybug (La Coccinelle de Madenn)
The peasant Guethenoc claims that Arthur has gotten his daughter Madenn pregnant. Arthur denies it publicly but in conversation with Madenn is thrilled and gives the child a gift of a knife.
I.i.44 (1-44): Patience in the Plain (Patience dans la plaine)
Waiting for the enemy on the battlefield.
I.i.45 (1-45): The Oud (Le Oud) – cf. Oud
Arthur finds an Egyptian instrument and plays it to various court members, with various results.
I.i.46 (1-46): The Code Of Chivalry (Le Code de Chevalerie)
Writer: Fabien Rault. The Code has been translated from Old Celtic into the common tongue. It turns out to be inappropriate for modern needs, and they go back to using the Old Celtic version.
I.i.47 (1-47): Lethal (Létal)
Various attitudes towards capital punishment at Kaamelott.
I.i.48 (1-48): Azenor (Azenor)
Arthur acquires a new mistress (Emma de Caunes), who sees the post as a way to becoming queen.
I.i.49 (1-49): A Spell of Anger (Le Sort de rage)
Merlin offers a spell to make Arthur's soldiers angry on the battlefield. It has the same effect on enemy soldiers, though.
I.i.50 (1-50): The New Brothers (Les Nouveaux Frères)
Yvain and Gauvain are to be initiated into knighthood as a team.
I.ii.1 (1-51): Illuminations (Enluminures)
Father Blaise tries to chronicle Perceval's adventures as reported at the Round Table, but Perceval contradicts himself too often.
I.ii.2 (1-52): Haunted (Haunted)*
Bohort is frightened one night by the ghost of Uther Pendragon, and goes to Arthur for comfort.
I.ii.3 (1-53): Lancelot's Secret (Le Secret de Lancelot)
Lancelot volunteers to monitor Guenièvre's chastity whenever Arthur is away, and takes over the key to her chastity belt.
I.ii.4 (1-54): The Gigantic Snake (Le Serpent géant)
Perceval and Karadoc describe their encounter with a dragon, or maybe a good-sized eel.
I.ii.5 (1-55): Guenièvre And the Birds (Guenièvre et les oiseaux)
The Queen is afraid of birds and won't dine in a room where the roof lets them in. Arthur is afraid of snakes.
I.ii.6 (1-56): The Last Emperor (Le Dernier Empereur)*
Caius Camillus comes to dine at Kaamelott. He argues with Arthur and Léodagan about the value of Roman civilization; they refer to the 11-year-old emperor in Rome.
I.ii.7 (1-57): Perceval Restarts from Fifteen (Perceval relance de quinze)
Perceval and Karadoc play Cul de Chouette (a simple dice game) with the taverner, but Perceval tries to explain a game he knows better, a Welsh game.
I.ii.8 (1-58): The Sword-Blow (Le Coup d'épée)
Usually Merlin heals wounds with magic, but he decides to try the new discipline of "medicine" on Arthur's battle-wound, starting by disinfecting with salt.
I.ii.9 (1-59): Calogrenant's Skirt (La Jupe de Calogrenant)
Calogrenant fell into a puddle on his way from Caledonia and the lower part of his armor is unwearable. Since the Round Table rule is that one must wear either armor or a national costume, he invents the kilt.
I.ii.10 (1-60): The Prodigy Of The Fakir (Le Prodige du fakir)
Yvain and Gauvain return from questing in Gaul with fabulous tales of narrowly escaping attack by some street entertainers.
I.ii.11 (1-61): A Noise At Night (Un Bruit dans la nuit)
In camp on the eve of battle, Bohort is frightened by animal noises and Arthur reassures him that there is nothing more frightening than immature rabbits in the vicinity.
I.ii.12 (1-62): Guethenoc's Late Donkey (Feu L'Ane de Guethenoc)
Guethenoc and Roparzh, two peasants, come to Arthur's court to complain about each other.
I.ii.13 (1-63): Goustan The Cruel (Goustan le Cruel)
A visit from Léodagan's father provides a contrast between Arthur's methods of ruling and those of the "old school" kings of his father's generation. Why would people rather live in Arthur's Logres than in Carmélide?
I.ii.14 (1-64): The Sparkling Cauldron (Le Chaudron rutilant)
Perceval and Arthur on a quest for a wonderful object. Unfortunately Perceval left the instructions at the tavern. (Mention of the Transport Seats, subject of the second Kaamelott comic book.)
I.ii.15 (1-65): The Visit Of Ygerne (La Visite d'Ygerne)
Arthur's mother arrives at Kaamelott and criticizes absolutely everything, saying Arthur is not the man his father Uther was.
I.ii.16 (1-66): Incognito (Les Clandestins)
Arthur and several of his men take refuge in the tavern during a snowstorm. Arthur doesn't want anyone to know the king is there, but Perceval and Karadoc are all too familiar to the tavern's regulars.
I.ii.17 (1-67): The Kleptomaniac (La Kleptomane)
Arthur's new mistress Azénor steals food. He tells her he likes her anyway.
I.ii.18 (1-68): Bread (Le Pain)
When the region's bread is criticized, Guethenoc is asked to bring samples for testing by Karadoc.
I.ii.19 (1-69): Morte Darthur (La Mort le roy Arthur)--cf. Le Morte d'Arthur ("The Death of Arthur") as a title for medieval English works, as well as the final book of the French Lancelot-Grail cycle.
Father Blaise is raising funds for the empty exchequer by giving guided tours of Kaamelott, including the tomb of King Arthur.
I.ii.20 (1-70): The Cabbage Situation (Le Problème du chou)
Guethenoc proposes that, since battles near Kaamelott have destroyed his cabbage crop, he should be allowed to grow his vegetables inside the castle compound.
I.ii.21 (1-71): A King In The Tavern (Un Roi à la taverne)
Arthur tries to pry Perceval and Karadoc out of the tavern and get them back to the castle.
I.ii.22 (1-72): Guenièvre's Behind (Les Fesses de Guenièvre)
The queen has somehow acquired a nickname: Guinièvre of the White Bottom. Is this appropriate? Is it true to fact?
I.ii.23 (1-73): The Love Letter (Le Billet doux)
Guenièvre's lady-in-waiting, Angharad, wants to communicate her love to Perceval.
I.ii.24 (1-74): Guenièvre And The Storm (Guenièvre et l'orage)
Guenièvre is so frightened by a storm at night that Arthur must, exceptionally, hold her in his arms for a while.
I.ii.25 (1-75): Ennuch And Hot Rabbits (Eunuque et chauds lapins)
Narsès the Eunuch (Denis Maréchal) comes to dinner. Perceval joins him and Arthur and they have to explain to him what it means to be a eunuch. The Narsès proposes that the others have sex while he watches.
I.ii.26 (1-76): Frontal Shock (Choc frontal)
The inhabitants of Kaamelott infuriate each other, one way and another.
I.ii.27 (1-77): Grail Mining (Le Forage)
Arthur (on a horse) finds Karadoc and Perceval have determined that the Grail must be buried, so they are digging a hole to find it. It must be somewhere....
I.ii.28 (1-78): The Discobolus (Le Discobole)
Guenièvre, back from a trip to Rome, brought a fine sculpture to decorate her and Arthur's bedroom. Arthur refuses to have a statue of a naked man in his room, however.
I.ii.29 (1-79): The Exorcism Of Merlin (L'Expurgation de Merlin)
The Répurgateur (Élie Semoun) gets Merlin to declare his allegiance to "The one God, Saint Germain and Saint Didier" as a means of renouncing polytheism.
I.ii.30 (1-80): The Volunteers (Les volontaires)
Perceval and Karadoc agree to accompany Arthur on a quest in an underground maze, but flee when confronted with goblins.
I.ii.31 (1-81): Shapeshifting (Polymorphie)
Ygerne recounts Arthur's conception at Tintagel: Merlin made Uther Pendragon look like her husband Duke Gorlois, so she agreed to sleep with him. Later, Arthur points out to Guenièvre that so long as he does not try to sleep with her she will know he is not an imposter. --cf. Uther Pendragon.
I.ii.32 (1-82): Nocturnal Decibels (Décibels nocturnes)
Merlin offers Arthur some cures for snoring.
I.ii.33 (1-83): Winter Celebration (La Fête de l'hiver)
Ygerne wants Arthur to visit Tintagel for the celebration. He refuses to go there.
I.ii.34 (1-84): Gladiator (Gladiator)
Guenièvre, on her visit to Rome, inadvertently got a gladiator to pledge to fight Arthur with her as the prize. Now he has arrived at Kaamelott ready to duel.
I.ii.35 (1-85): Wounded unto Death (La Blessure mortelle)
Morgan Le Fay arrives when Arthur has been gravely wounded in battle, ready to schlep him off to Avalon as per her contract. However, Merlin heals the wound.
I.ii.36 (1-86): The Dragon Of The Tunnels (Le Dragon des tunnels)
This time Arthur goes on a quest in an underground maze with Perceval, Karadoc, and Bohort, none of whom proves to be a courageous backup.
I.ii.37 (1-87): Home from the Battlefield (Retour de campagne)
Guenièvre vainly hopes that Arthur will celebrate his return from battle by begetting an heir.
I.ii.38 (1-88): The Escort (L'Escorte)
Léodagan accompanies Bohort on a night journey from military camp to the Round Table, and the two enjoy each other's company.
I.ii.39 (1-89): Like A Knight (Tel un chevalier)
Perceval tries to have a conversation with Arthur but gets lost in the words that might or might not express what he feels.
I.ii.40 (1-90): Marzipan (La Pâte d'amande)
Guenièvre has exhausted her marzipan supply, brought home from Rome. She becomes quite unpleasant. Fortunately, Bohort still has some left....
I.ii.41 (1-91): The Dragon's Fury (La Fureur du dragon)
Yvain and Gauvain try a dragon-slaying quest under Arthur's supervision but are humiliated.
I.ii.42 (1-92): Vox Populi (Vox Populi) – cf. Vox populi.
Arthur goes to the tavern incognito to find out what people think about him. The taverner thinks the tax on drink proves King Arthur is a bad ruler.
I.ii.43 (1-93): Unagi (Unagi) – Japanese for "eel."
Perceval and Karadoc demonstrate their new form of martial arts.
I.ii.44 (1-94): The Scout (L'Éclaireur)
Perceval is sent as a scout to spy out the enemy, but Arthur has to go with him.
I.ii.45 (1-95): Lacrimosa (Lacrimosa) – Latin for "weepy": in music, Lacrimosa is part of the Dies Irae sequence in the Requiem mass.
Demetra schemes with Guenièvre to help in the begetting of the heir: a potion will make Arthur sad, and he will turn to his wife for comfort, and nature will take its course. The potion works, but not the plan.
I.ii.46 (1-96): The Quest of the Two Foxes (La Quête des Deux Renards)
Perceval and Karadoc had a rough time on their last quest: they ate some mutton at the tavern, and it was off, and they got really sick....
I.ii.47 (1-97): Agnus Dei (Agnus Dei) – Lamb of God, a sung part of the Latin Mass.
The prayers of Arthur and Guenièvre to the Christian God.
I.ii.48 (1-98): Torment (Le Tourment)
Full moon. Love and jealousy torment various inhabitants of Kaamelott.
I.ii.49 (1-99): Retirement (La Retraite)
Perceval wonders at what age knights get to retire—he has plans for a little house in Wales....
I.ii.50 (1-100): The True Nature Of the Graal (La Vraie Nature du Graal)
In the midst of a dispute over whether an improved road is actually an improvement, Arthur makes a stirring speech which recalls the knights of the Round Table to their quest... for a few moments, anyway.

=== Book II ===
Broadcast May 2 through October 7, 2005, except for 12 episodes which were broadcast in December 2005. These are (in order of original broadcast): II.ii.21, Educational Psychology; II.i.45 Amen, II.ii.12 Arthur's Secret, II.11.2 Excalibur and Destiny, II.ii.18 Stargate, II.ii.30 The Magic Parchments, II.i.28 The Secret Passage, II.i.47 Conspiracy, II.ii.32 Three Hundred Sixty Degrees, II.ii.48 Roman Fringe, II.ii.50 Accounting, II.ii.49 Public Speaking.

The DVD includes 2 volumes of 50 episodes each. They are numbered II.i.1 or II.ii.1 etc. Parenthetical numbers refer to the broadcast order.

II.i.1 (2-80): Spangenhelm (Spangenhelm) – cf. Spangenhelm.
II.i.2 (2-42): The Alchemists (Les Alchimistes)
II.i.3 (2-40): Peace Dialogue (Le Dialogue De Paix)
II.i.4 (2-6): The Portrait (Le Portrait)
Writer: Fabien Rault
II.i.5 (2-15): Silbury Hill (Silbury Hill) – cf. Silbury Hill
Writer: Joëlle Sevilla
II.i.6 (2-12): Reclassification (Le Reclassement)
II.i.7 (2-4): The Gathering Of The Raven (Le Rassemblement Du Corbeau)
II.i.8 (2-74): The Volunteers II (Les Volontaires II)
II.i.9 (2-5): The Terrorist (Le Terroriste)
II.i.10 (2-3): The Bedroom (La Chambre)
II.i.11 (2-31): The Coded Message (Le Message Codé)
II.i.12 (2-27): The Moorish Envoys (La Délégation Maure)
II.i.13 (2-10): The Abduction Of Guenièvre (L'Enlèvement De Guenièvre) – see the section on this in Guinevere.
Writer: Lionnel Astier
II.i.14 (2-35): Bohort's Military Training (Les Classes De Bohort)
II.i.15 (2-17): Arthur's World (Le Monde D'Arthur)
II.i.16 (2-24): The Tutors (Les Tuteurs)
II.i.17 (2-39): The Fisherman's Twins (Les Jumelles Du Pêcheur)
II.i.18 (2-22): Seven Hundred And Forty Four (Sept Cent Quarante Quatre)
II.i.19 (2-62): The Absolution (L'Absolution)
II.i.20 (2-21): The Misanthropists (Les Misanthropes)
II.i.21 (2-29): The Chest (La Cassette)
II.i.22 (2-18): Nearer to Thee (Plus Près De Toi) – beginning of the hymn, "Nearer, My God, to Thee"
Writer: Nicholas Gabion.
II.i.23 (2-9): Revolting (La Révolte)
II.i.24 (2-14): Under Lock and Key (Sous Les Verrous)
II.i.25 (2-2): Séli And the Rodents (Séli Et Les Rongeurs)
II.i.26 (2-58): A King In The Tavern II (Un Roi A La Taverne II)
II.i.27 (2-33): Olden Days (L'Ancien Temps)
II.i.28 (2-95): The Secret Passage (Le Passage Secret)
II.i.29 (2-25): The Bad Seeds (Les Mauvaises Graines)
II.i.30 (2-38): The Royal Guards (La Garde Royale)
II.i.31 (2-28): Drunkenness (L'Ivresse)
II.i.32 (2-69): Mater Dixit (Mater Dixit) – Latin for "Mother said"
Writers: Lionnel and Alexandre Astier.
II.i.33 (2-68): Spirits (Spiritueux)
II.i.34 (2-61): Round Dance (La Ronde) – cf. Schnitzler's play.
II.i.35 (2-56): Merlin The Archaique (Merlin L'Archaique)
II.i.36 (2-1): The Exploited (Les Exploités)
II.i.37 (2-13): The Escort II (L'Escorte II)
II.i.38 (2-26): Theft (Le Larcin)
II.i.39 (2-77): The Meeting (La Rencontre)
II.i.40 (2-82): Homing Pigeons (Les Pigeons)
II.i.41 (2-50): O Brother Where Art Thou? (O'Brother)*
II.i.42 (2-34): Spring Celebration (La Fête Du Printemps)
II.i.43 (2-65): Heavenly Voice (La Voix Céleste)
II.i.44 (2-52): Invincible (L'Invincible)
II.i.45 (2-90): Amen (Amen)
II.i.46 (2-43): The Gift (Le Cadeau)
II.i.47 (2-96): Conspiracy (Le Complot)
II.i.48 (2-16): Arthur's Alertness (La Vigilance D'Arthur)
II.i.49 (2-53): The Dogs of War (Les Chiens De Guerre) – Shakespeare, Julius Caesar.
II.i.50 (2-78): Always (Always)*
II.ii.1 (2-51): Arthur In Love (Arthur In Love)
II.ii.2 (2-92): Excalibur and Destiny (Excalibur Et Le Destin)
II.ii.3 (2-47): Absentee (L'Absent)
II.ii.4 (2-46): The Game (The Game)
II.ii.5 (2-48): The Perfect Fifth (La Quinte juste) – cf. Perfect fifth.
II.ii.6 (2-85): White Smoke (La Fumée blanche)
II.ii.7 (2-7): Unagi II (Unagi II)
II.ii.8 (2-37): A Battle of Maids (La Joute Ancillaire)
II.ii.9 (2-49): The Informer (Le Donneur)
II.ii.10 (2-81): The Pebble Game (Le Jeu Du Caillou)
II.ii.11 (2-60): Alliance (L'Alliance)
II.ii.12 (2-91): Arthur's Secret (Le Secret D'Arthur)
II.ii.13 (2-63): For All to See (Aux Yeux De Tous)
II.ii.14 (2-20): Immaculate Karadoc (Immaculé Karadoc)
II.ii.15 (2-72): The Dacian's Bite (La Morsure Du Dace)
II.ii.16 (2-59): Eternal Snows (Les Neiges Eternelles)
II.ii.17 (2-87): Men of Honor (Des Hommes D'Honneur)
II.ii.18 (2-93): Stargate (Stargate)*
II.ii.19 (2-41): Roparzh's Late Cow (Feue La Vache De Roparzh)
II.ii.20 (2-45): Wishes and Vows (Les Voeux)
II.ii.21 (2-89): Educational Psychology (Le Pédagogue)
II.ii.22 (2-36): Perceval and the Counter-Syrup (Perceval Et Le Contre Sirop)
II.ii.23 (2-83): Neglect (L'Oubli)
II.ii.24 (2-11): Ambition (L'Ambition)
II.ii.25 (2-32): The Poem (Le Poème)
II.ii.26 (2-23): Corpore Sano (Corpore Sano)-- cf. Mens sana in corpore sano
II.ii.27 (2-44): The Haven Of Peace (Le Havre De Paix)
II.ii.28 (2-73): Guenièvre's Birthday (L'Anniversaire De Guenièvre)
II.ii.29 (2-54): A Kick up Your Sleeve II (La Botte Secrète II)
II.ii.30 (2-94): The Magic Parchments (Les Parchemins Magiques)
II.ii.31 (2-88): Irritation (L'Enragé)
II.ii.32 (2-97): Three Hundred And Sixty Degrees (Trois Cent Soixante Degrès)
II.ii.33 (2-67): Puppets (Pupi)
Writers: Joëlle Sevilla and Alexandre Astier.
II.ii.34 (2-8): Vox Populi II (Vox Populi II)
II.ii.35 (2-76): The Rebel (Le Rebelle)
II.ii.36 (2-86): Happy Birthday (Les Félicitations)
II.ii.37 (2-19): Bets (Les Paris)
II.ii.38 (2-55): The Slaves (Les Esclaves)
II.ii.39 (2-71): Flags (Les Drapeaux)
II.ii.40 (2-79): Lookout (Le Guet)
II.ii.41 (2-64): The Lost Spell (Le Sort Perdu)
II.ii.42 (2-66): Restriction (La Restriction)
II.ii.43 (2-57): The Rope (La Corde)
II.ii.44 (2-30): Torment II (Tourment II)
II.ii.45 (2-84): The National Dish (Le Plat National)
II.ii.46 (2-70): A Time for Secrets (Le Temps Des Secrets)
II.ii.47 (2-75): Arthur's Conscience (La Conscience D'Arthur)
II.ii.48 (2-98): The Roman Fringe/Bangs (La Frange Romaine)--pun on Celtic Fringe + haircut with bangs.
II.ii.49 (2-100): Public Speaking (L'Orateur)
II.ii.50 (2-99): Accounting (Les Comptes)

=== Book III ===
Broadcast January 9 through March 22, 2006.

The DVD includes 2 volumes of 50 episodes each. They are numbered III.i.1 or III.ii.1 etc. Parenthetical numbers refer to the broadcast order.

III.i.1 (3-1): The Knight Errant (Le Chevalier Errant) – cf. Knight-errant.
III.i.2 (3-3): Bohort's Confession (L'Aveu De Bohort)
III.i.3 (3-6): Generosity (Le Magnanime)
III.i.4 (3-5): Good-Luck Charm (Le Porte-Bonheur)
III.i.5 (3-16): Séfriane Of Aquitaine (Séfriane D'Aquitaine)
III.i.6 (3-7): The Battle Of The Chieftains (Le Combat Des Chefs)
III.i.7 (3-26): The Deserter (Le Déserteur)
III.i.8 (3-12): The Energy Tonic (La Potion De Vivacité)
III.i.9 (3-8): The Boar Of Cornwall (Le Sanglier De Cornouailles)
III.i.10 (3-35): The Ankou (L'Ankou) – cf. Ankou.
III.i.11 (3-15): Ablutions (Ablutions)
III.i.12 (3-23): Poetics Part 1 (La Poétique 1ère Partie)
III.i.13 (3-24): Poetics Part 2 (La Poétique 2ème Partie)
III.i.14 (3-13): The Ultimate Insult (Les Derniers Outrages)
III.i.15 (3-37): Guenièvre And Euripides (Guenièvre Et Euripide) – cf. The Trojan Women
III.i.16 (3-14): Unagi III (Unagi III)
III.i.17 (3-10): The Scourge Of God II (Le Fléau De Dieu II)
III.i.18 (3-25): Cryda Of Tintagel (Cryda De Tintagel)
III.i.19 (3-30): Drunkenness II (L'Ivresse II)
III.i.20 (3-32): Legenda (Legenda)
III.i.21 (3-4): Magical Reinforcements (Le Renfort Magique)
III.i.22 (3-21): Silbury Hill II (Silbury Hill II)
III.i.23 (3-9): The Professional (Le Professionnel)*
III.i.24 (3-28): The Replacements (Les Suppléants)
III.i.25 (3-42): Nomad's Night (La Nuit Du Nomade)
III.i.26 (3-89): Kings's Meeting Part 1(L'Assemblée Des Rois 1ère Partie)
III.i.27 (3-90): Kings's Meeting Part 2 (L'Assemblée Des Rois 2ème Partie)
III.i.28 (3-62): The Transporter Arch (L'Arche De Transport)
III.i.29 (3-34): Cousins (Les Cousins)
III.i.30 (3-27): Confusion (Le Trouble)
III.i.31 (3-11): Tournament (Le Tournoi)
III.i.32 (3-31): Moonstone (La Pierre De Lune)
III.i.33 (3-47): The Medium (La Pythie) – cf. Pythia.
III.i.34 (3-46): Black Hair (Les Cheveux Noirs)
III.i.35 (3-38): Dream On (Dream On)
III.i.36 (3-53): Guethenoc's Late Hen (Feue La Poule De Guethenoc)
III.i.37 (3-22): Warrior's Rest II (Le Repos Du Guerrier II)
III.i.38 (3-19): The Emancipated Slaves (Les Affranchis)
III.i.39 (3-36): The Nails Of The Holy Cross (Les Clous De La Sainte Croix) – cf. Nail (relic).
III.i.40 (3-52): The Cornucopia (La Corne D'Abondance)
III.i.41 (3-2): Morituri (Morituri) – Latin for "we who are about to die," famously spoken by gladiators saluting the Roman Emperor before combat.
III.i.42 (3-20): Peace Dialogue II (Le Dialogue De Paix II)
III.i.43 (3-80): Stargate II (Stargate II)*
III.i.44 (3-51): Abstinence (L'Abstinent)
III.i.45 (3-56): For All to See II (Aux Yeux De Tous II)
III.i.46 (3-33): Truth Serum (La Potion De Vérité)
III.i.47 (3-29): Hop O'my Thumb (Le Petit Poucet) – cf. Hop o' My Thumb
III.i.48 (3-61): Haunted II (Haunted II)
III.i.49 (3-44): Revolting II (La Révolte II)
III.i.50 (3-18): Perceval Sings Sloubi (Perceval Chante Sloubi)
III.ii.1 (3-50): Alexander's Day (Le Jour D'Alexandre)
III.ii.2 (3-39): The Chest II (La Cassette II)
III.ii.3 (3-48): Poltergeist (Poltergeist*)
III.ii.4 (3-45): Bets II (Les Paris II)
III.ii.5 (3-55): Ladies' Delight (Au Bonheur Des Dames – title of a novel by Émile Zola)
III.ii.6 (3-66): Watchtowers (Les Tourelles)
III.ii.7 (3-57): Kitchen And Addi(c)tions (Cuisine Et Dépendances)*
III.ii.8 (3-40): Arthur Sensei (Arthur Sensei)
III.ii.9 (3-49): The Loner (Le Solitaire)
III.ii.10 (3-54): Festivities (Les Festivités)
III.ii.11 (3-41): The Phantom Menace (La Menace Fantôme)*
III.ii.12 (3-58): Collaboration (La Coopération)
III.ii.13 (3-60): Woman in a Hurry (L'Empressée)
III.ii.14 (3-59): Round Dance II (La Ronde II)
III.ii.15 (3-43): Mission (Mission)
III.ii.16 (3-64): The Catapult (La Baliste)
III.ii.17 (3-68): Baraka (La Baraka) – cf. Barakah.
III.ii.18 (3-87): Staying up Late (La Veillée)
III.ii.19 (3-65): Torment III (Le Tourment III)
III.ii.20 (3-67): Fertility Potion II (La Potion De Fécondité II)
III.ii.21 (3-69): Night Attack (L'Attaque Nocturne)
III.ii.22 (3-70): Restriction II (La Restriction II)
III.ii.23 (3-96): Merlin's Challenges II (Les Défis De Merlin)
III.ii.24 (3-17): Surfactants And Detergents (Saponides Et Detergents)
III.ii.25 (3-78): The Righter Of Wrongs (Le Justicier)
III.ii.26 (3-63): The Baleful Crypt (La Crypte Maléfique)
III.ii.27 (3-71): Arthur In Love II (Arthur In Love II)
III.ii.28 (3-72): Battle of the Century (La Grande Bataille)
III.ii.29 (3-73): Winter Celebration II (La Fête De L'Hiver II)
III.ii.30 (3-84): Under Lock and Key II (Sous Les Verrous II)
III.ii.31 (3-82): The Popularizer (Le Vulgarisateur)
III.ii.32 (3-75): Witness (Witness)*
III.ii.33 (3-74): A Royal Gift (Le Tribut)
III.ii.34 (3-92): Secret Worship (Le Culte Secret)
III.ii.35 (3-83): Mangonel (Le Mangonneau)-- cf. Mangonel.
III.ii.36 (3-86): Chivalry (La Chevalerie)
III.ii.37 (3-91): A Bad Omen (Le Mauvais Augure)
III.ii.38 (3-81): Budget II (Raison D'Argent II)
III.ii.39 (3-76): Auditing the Class (Les Auditeurs Libres)
III.ii.40 (3-93): Roman Kissing (Le Baiser Romain)
III.ii.41 (3-79): The Spy (L'Espion)
III.ii.42 (3-77): Alone In The Dark (Alone In The Dark)*
III.ii.43 (3-95): The Legislator (Le Législateur)
III.ii.44 (3-85): The Insomniac (L'Insomniaque)
III.ii.45 (3-88): The Student (L'Etudiant)
III.ii.46 (3-94): The Mediator (Le Médiateur)
III.ii.47 (3-97): The Trophy (Le Trophée)
III.ii.48 (3-98): Hollow Man (Hollow Man)*--movie title ultimatelyderived from poem by T. S. Eliot
III.ii.49 (3-99): The Quarrel Part 1 (La Dispute 1ère Partie)
III.ii.50 (3-100): The Quarrel Part 2 (La Dispute 2ème Partie)

=== Book IV ===
Broadcast between September 18 and November 24, 2006. The DVD includes 1 volume of 50 episodes and one of 49 (the final episode being a double one with no pause). They are numbered IV.i.1 or IV.ii.1 etc. Parenthetical numbers refer to the broadcast order.

IV.i.1 (4-1): When April with its showers sweet Part 1 (Tous Les Matins Du Monde 1ère Partie)*
IV.i.2 (4-2): When April with its showers sweet Part 2 (Tous Les Matins Du Monde 2ème Partie)
IV.i.3 (4-3): Sense and Sensibility (Raison Et Sentiments – title of Jane Austen's novel in French translation))
IV.i.4 (4-4): The Labyrinth (Le Dédale)
IV.i.5 (4-5): Strawberry Pie (Les Tartes Aux Fraises)
IV.i.6 (4-6): Trackers (Les Pisteurs)
IV.i.7 (4-10): The Traitor (Le Traître)
IV.i.8 (4-7): The Fault Part 1 (La Faute 1ère Partie)
IV.i.9 (4-8): The Fault Part 2 (La Faute 2ème Partie)
IV.i.10 (4-9): The Lion Rising (L'Ascension Du Lion)
IV.i.11 (4-11): A Simple Life (Une Vie Simple)
IV.i.12 (4-12): The King's Favor (Le Privilégié)
IV.i.13 (4-13): Very Upset (Le Bouleversé)
IV.i.14 (4-15): Dangerous Liaisons (Les Liaisons Dangereuses) – title of the novel by Chloderlos de Laclos
IV.i.15 (4-16): The Exploited II (Les Exploités II)
IV.i.16 (4-14): Dagonnet and the Land Register (Dagonnet Et Le Cadastre)
IV.i.17 (4-17): Duel Part 1 (Duel 1ère Partie)
IV.i.18 (4-18): Duel Part 2 (Duel 2ème Partie)
IV.i.19 (4-19): The British Creed (La Foi Bretonne)
IV.i.20 (4-20): On His Majesty's Secret Service (Au Service Secret De Sa Majesté)* – title of a James Bond novel by Ian Fleming.
IV.i.21 (4-21): Parade (La Parade)
IV.i.22 (4-22): Lord Caius (Seigneur Caius)
IV.i.23 (4-23): The Trade Part 1 (L'Echange 1ère Partie)
IV.i.24 (4-24): The Trade Part 2 (L'Echange 2ème Partie)
IV.i.25 (4-25): Perceval's Scale (L’Échelle de Perceval)
IV.i.26 (4-26): The Queen's Bedroom (La Chambre de la reine)
IV.i.27 (4-27): Liberated (Les Émancipés)
IV.i.28 (4-28): Rejected (La Révoquée)
IV.i.29 (4-29): The Catapult II (La Baliste II)
IV.i.30 (4-30): The Maids (Les Bonnes) – title of a Jean Genet play
IV.i.31 (4-31): Revolting III (La Révolte III)
IV.i.32 (4-32): The Report (Le Rapport)
IV.i.33 (4-33): Table Manners (L’Art de la table)
IV.i.34 (4-34): The Novices (Les Novices)
IV.i.35 (4-35): The Repressed (Les Refoulés)
IV.i.36 (4-36): The Tutors II (Les Tuteurs II)
IV.i.37 (4-37): Torment IV (Le Tourment IV)
IV.i.38 (4-38): The Gathering of the Raven II (Le Rassemblement du corbeau II)
IV.i.39 (4-39): The Great Departure (Le Grand Départ)
IV.i.40 (4-41): The Red Inn (L’Auberge rouge)*
IV.i.41 (4-43): Curiosity part 1 (Les Curieux 1re partie)
IV.i.42 (4-44): Curiosity part 2 (Les Curieux 2e partie)
IV.i.43 (4-40): The Lady in Hiding (La Clandestine)
IV.i.44 (4-42): The Invaders (Les Envahisseurs)
IV.i.45 (4-47): Life is beautiful (La vie est belle)*
IV.i.46 (4-55): Relief (La Relève)
IV.i.47 (4-45): Tactics part 1 (Les Tacticiens 1re partie)
IV.i.48 (4-46): Tactics part 2 (Les Tacticiens 2e partie)
IV.i.49 (4-85): Dragon Ships! (Drakkars !) – i.e. a Viking Longship.
IV.i.50 (4-49): The Answer (La Réponse)
IV.ii.1 (4-48): Unagi IV (Unagi IV)
IV.ii.2 (4-59): AWOL (La Permission)
IV.ii.3 (4-50): Angels & Demons (Anges et Démons – title of a book by Dan Brown)
IV.ii.4 (4-51): Remanence (La Rémanence) – cf. Remanence.
IV.ii.5 (4-69): Shelter (Le Refuge)
IV.ii.6 (4-60): The Gray Dragon (Le Dragon gris)
IV.ii.7 (4-52): Energy Tonic II (La Potion de vivacité II)
IV.ii.8 (4-53): Vox populi III (Vox populi III)
IV.ii.9 (4-54): The Poll (La Sonde)
IV.ii.10 (4-61): Reassignment (La Réaffectation)
IV.ii.11 (4-57): Poetics II part 1 (La Poétique II 1re partie)
IV.ii.12 (4-58): Poetics II part 2 (La Poétique II 2e partie)
IV.ii.13 (4-62): Wargames (Le Jeu de la guerre)
IV.ii.14 (4-63): Ygerne's Dream (Le Rêve d’Ygerne)
IV.ii.15 (4-64): The Chaperones(Les Chaperons)
IV.ii.16 (4-65): The Regular (L’Habitué)
IV.ii.17 (4-66): The Roman Camp (Le Camp romain)
IV.ii.18 (4-79): The Usurper (L’Usurpateur)
IV.ii.19 (4-67): Lot and the Grail (Loth et le Graal)
IV.ii.20 (4-75): God's Knight (Le Paladin) – cf. Paladin.
IV.ii.21 (4-56): Perceval plays raitournelle (Perceval fait raitournelle)
IV.ii.22 (4-71): The Lady and the Lake (La Dame et le Lac)
IV.ii.23 (4-72): Much Ado About Nothing (Beaucoup de bruit pour rien) – title of Shakespeare play
IV.ii.24 (4-70): The Ultimatum (L’Ultimatum)
IV.ii.25 (4-73): The Oud II (Le Oud II)
IV.ii.26 (4-68): The Reheasal (La Répétition)
IV.ii.27 (4-74): The Speech (Le Discours)
IV.ii.28 (4-76): Gawain's Choice (Le Choix de Gauvain)
IV.ii.29 (4-80): Fluctuat nec mergitur (Fluctuat nec mergitur) – "She is tossed by the waves but does not sink"; cf. Fluctuat nec mergitur.
IV.ii.30 (4-77): The Meeting part 1 (Le Face-à-face 1re partie)
IV.ii.31 (4-78): The Meeting part 2 (Le Face-à-face 2e partie)
IV.ii.32 (4-95): Entente cordiale (L’Entente cordiale) – cf. Entente cordiale
IV.ii.33 (4-86): Approval (L’Approbation)
IV.ii.34 (4-89): Alone in the Dark II (Alone in the Dark II)*
IV.ii.35 (4-81): Yvain's Wound (La Blessure d’Yvain)
IV.ii.36 (4-82): Corpore sano II (Corpore sano II)
IV.ii.37 (4-83): The Enchanter (L’Enchanteur)
IV.ii.38 (4-84): Well-Named (Les Bien Nommés)
IV.ii.39 (4-87): The Prisoner (La Prisonnière)
IV.ii.40 (4-88): Bets III (Les Paris III)
IV.ii.41 (4-90): Invisibility Shields (Les Plaques de dissimulation)
IV.ii.42 (4-91): The Technicality (Le Vice de forme)
IV.ii.43 (4-93): Renunciation part 1 (Le Renoncement 1re partie)
IV.ii.44 (4-94): Renunciation part 2 (Le Renoncement 2e partie)
IV.ii.45 (4-92): Inspiration (L’Inspiration)
IV.ii.46 (4-96): The Debtors (Les Endettés)
IV.ii.47 (4-97): Double Dragon (Double Dragon) – video game, movie, etc.; cf. Double Dragon (disambiguation)
IV.ii.48 (4-98): Rescue (Le Sauvetage)
IV.ii.49 (4-99): Disorder and Night (parts 1 & 2) (Le Désordre et la Nuit 1re et 2e parties)*

=== Book V ===
Broadcast involved two 50-minute episodes on May 1, 2007, followed by 25 7-minute episodes covering the same material; and one 50-minute episode on November 5, 2007, followed by 25 7-minute episodes covering the same material, for a total of 50 episodes.

Book V was issued on DVD in yet a third edit. Although there are three "volumes" (tomes), i.e. three disks containing episodes, the eight episodes are numbered sequentially, not by volume as in Books I-IV. Each long episode is divided into 5-7 scenes, whose titles correspond to the titles of the original 50 episodes. The numbering below is as follows: Book (Roman cap), Episode (Arabic), Scene (Arabic), separated by periods, in DVD order. The two-part numbers in parentheses, as above, indicate the broadcast order of the 7-minute episodes with these titles.

V.1: Corvus Corone – Latin for "Crow/Raven of the Crown"
V.1.1 (5-1): The Penitents (Les Repentants)
V.1.2 (5-2): Miserere Nobis (Miserere Nobis) – Latin for "have mercy on us," refrain of the Agnus Dei in a non-Requiem Mass
V.1.3 (5-3): Last Resort (Le Dernier Recours)
V.1.4 (5-4): The New Clans (Les Nouveaux Clans)
V.1.5 (5-5): The Sorceress (La Sorcière)
V.1.6 (5-6): The Sword Of The Kings (L'Épée Des Rois)
V.2: The Rock and the Sword (La Roche Et Le Fer)
V.2.1 (5-7): Corvus Corone (Corvus Corone)
V.2.2 (5-8): The Journey (Le Périple)
V.2.3 (5-9): Resignation (La Démission)
V.2.4 (5-10): The Recruiters (Les Recruteurs)
V.2.5 (5-11): Howl (Hurlements)
V.2.6 (5-12): The Rock and the Sword (La Roche Et Le Fer)
V.3: Vae Soli! – Latin for "Woe unto the man who is alone."
V.3.1 (5-13): The Crown Princes (Les Dauphins)
V.3.2 (5-14): Vae Soli ! (Vae Soli !)
V.3.3 (5-15): From Aquitaine (Les Aquitains)
V.3.4 (5-16): Winter Fruits (Les Fruits D'Hiver)
V.3.5 (5-17): The Exiles (Les Exilés)
V.3.6 (5-18): Perceval of Sinope (Perceval De Sinope)--cf. Diogenes of Sinope (esp. the illustration).
V.4: Last Day ("Le Dernier Jour")
V.4.1 (5-19): Nocturnales (Les Nocturnales)
V.4.2 (5-20): Rivals (Les Rivales)
V.4.3 (5-21): For All To See III (Aux Yeux de Tous III)
V.4.4 (5-22): The Promise (La Promesse)
V.4.5 (5-23): The Forfeit (Le Forfait)
V.4.6 (5-24): Last Day (Le Dernier Jour)
V.4.7 (5-25): Chosen (L'Elu)
V.5: The Kingdom Without a Head (Le Royaume sans tête)
V.5.1 (5-26): The Kingdom Without a Head (Le Royaume sans tête)
V.5.2 (5-27): The Legal Adviser (Le Jurisconsulte)
V.5.3 (5-28): Executor (Exsecutor)
V.5.4 (5-29): The Substitute (Le Substitut)
V.5.5 (5-30): Thirsty for Blood (L'Avènement Du Sanguinaire)
V.5.6 (5-31): The Sentries (Les Sentinelles)
V.5.7 (5-32): Arthur's Odyssey (L'Odyssée D'Arthur)
V.6: Jizô – refers to a Japanese Bodhisattva who protects dead children in the afterlife; cf. Ksitigarbha.
V.6.1 (5-33): Domi Nostrae (Domi Nostrae) – Latin for "Home Sweet Home."
V.6.2 (5-34): The Petition (La Supplique)
V.6.3 (5-35): Ambushed (Les Embusqués)
V.6.4 (5-36): Childcare (La Nourrice)
V.6.5 (5-37): Upland Pasture (Les Transhumants)
V.6.6 (5-38): Jizô (Jizô)
V.7 : The Lighthouse (Le Phare)
V.7.1 (5-39): Unagi V (Unagi V)
V.7.2 (5-40): The Pioneers (Les Pionniers)
V.7.3 (5-41): The Intriguer (La Conspiratrice)
V.7.4 (5-42): Destitute (Le Destitué)
V.7.5 (5-43): The Lighthouse (Le Phare)
V.8: The Boy Who Cried Wolf (Le Garçon qui criait au loup) – cf. The Boy Who Cried Wolf.
V.8.1 (5-44): The Guide (Le Guide)
V.8.2 (5-45): Anton (Anton)
V.8.3 (5-46): Wandering Players (Les Itinérants)
V.8.4 (5-47): The Boy Who Cried Wolf (Le Garçon qui criait au loup)
V.8.5 (5-48): Theater of Ghosts (Le Théâtre Fantôme)
V.8.6 (5-49): The Return of the King (Le Retour du Roi)*
V.8.7 (5-50): The Underground River (La Rivière souterraine)

=== Book VI ===
The titles of the episodes are in Latin rather than French.

(6-1): The Unknown Soldier (Miles Ignotus)
(6-2): The Centurion (Centurio)
(6-3): Teachers (Praeceptores)
(6-4): In Search of Arthur (Arturi Inquisitio)
(6-5): Battle Leader (Dux Bellorum) – the term for Arthur used in the oldest surviving reference to him by name, the Historia Brittonum; cf. Dux.
(6-6): Wedding (Nuptiae)
(6-7): King Arthur (Arturus Rex)
(6-8): Tearful (Lacrimosa)– same title as I.ii.45
(6-9): Day of Wrath (Dies Irae)– same title as the original pilot
