= DragonQuest =

Fantasy role-playing game

- First edition cover
- Designers: Eric Goldberg, Gerry Klug, David James Ritchie, Edward J. Woods, Redmond A. Simonsen
- Publishers: Simulations Publications, TSR
- Publication: 1980 (1st edition); 1982 (2nd edition); 1989 (3rd edition)
- Genres: Fantasy
- Systems: Custom

DragonQuest is a fantasy role-playing game originally published by Simulations Publications (SPI) in 1980. Where first generation fantasy role-playing games such as Dungeons & Dragons (D&D) restricted players to particular character classes, DragonQuest was one of the first games to utilize a system that emphasized skills, allowing more individual customization and a wider range of options.

== System ==
=== Character generation ===
Character generation is much more involved than D&D, with the player using 10 sided dice to determine everything from the character's race to handedness to the number of points they have to distribute amongst the primary characteristics (Strength, Agility, Manual Dexterity, Magical Aptitude, Endurance, and Willpower) which determine the character's strengths and weaknesses. Being able to control the value of these attributes allows for greater flexibility in character generation. For example, players seeking a powerful magic user can divert points to Magical Aptitude and possibly Willpower. Those seeking pure fighters can invest their points in Strength, Agility and Manual Dexterity. By carefully balancing these numbers, fighter/mages, thief/assassins, and other combinations can be devised.

=== Magic ===
The magic system in DragonQuest features distinct Magical Colleges, each with its own group of spells and rituals. Player characters who enter magical study are assumed to have apprenticed with a mage of their particular Magic College, and have learned all the basic spells and a ritual or two from their former Master. Player characters cannot change Magic Colleges in the context of game play, and so are all essentially specialists in a college of magic. Some of the Magic Colleges include: Earth Magic, Air Magic, Fire Magic, Water Magic, Illusions, Ensorcelments, Greater & Lesser Summoning, and Necromantic Conjurations. The revised second edition and third edition (released by TSR) added some colleges and removed others.

Players expend fatigue points to cast spells, and must roll percentile dice to succeed. Many of the more powerful spells have a very low chance of success, and may backfire with random results (many quite unpleasant). By expending experience points, a mage may improve their ability to cast specific spells by gaining rank in them. There are also advanced spells which can be obtained from more powerful mages in one's Magic College. This advanced knowledge may require a substantial cash payment or some kind of quest to obtain, however. Certain spells require expensive or rare elements to work properly, while the majority are merely spoken.

Specific rules exist for player Adepts to invest objects to create magic items (such as rings, amulets, weapons, etc.) for later use by themselves or other party members. Such items are also found on occasion during an expedition or exploration.

=== Skills ===
Any player character may choose to learn various skills in DragonQuest. Vocations such as Ranger, Thief, Assassin, Merchant, Courtesan, Navigator, Healer, Military Scientist, Mechanician, Beastmaster, Troubador may be acquired by expending the necessary experience points. Certain other skills, such as Stealth, Horseback Riding, reading and/or writing a language can also be practiced and improved. Characters are not limited to any particular set of skills, and a Halfling Assassin who speaks perfect Elvish is technically possible.

Weapons are learned in much the same manner as Vocations. The limitation is that weapons have various maximum ranks (levels) which can be achieved, while other skills usually top out at rank ten. Magic spells gain improved chances of success and better strength when rank is gained in them also, and this is done on a spell-by-spell basis (e.g. character is a fire mage and has improved his skill to rank 6 in Fireball, but rank 0 in many other spells of his magic college which he considers less important).

Characters are required to spend many weeks training after an experience-generating adventure in order to increase skill levels. Weapons training typically requires the aid of a person of greater skill than the player, and hiring a weapon-master can be expensive as well. It is also possible that a character may actually be the expert in his/her local area, and so may have to travel some distance to receive instruction from a person of greater ability.

=== Combat ===
DragonQuest uses a hex grid and miniatures for combat. Unlike other systems, where the miniatures are merely placeholders, DragonQuest requires that characters know their facing, as attacks from the flanks and rear are more effective than frontal assaults. Combat takes place in five-second "pulses" and characters may only move short distances while actively engaged in a melee.

Each character has a strike chance % based on (mostly) their manual dexterity and the base chance of the weapon used to attack. Additional factors, such as running into an attack or achieving surprise—as in an ambush—modify this base chance. The defender's defensive % is subtracted from this number, and percentile dice rolled to see if a hit is achieved. When a hit is delivered, the attacker rolls a d10, adds the weapon's attack bonus, and subtracts the target's armor rating. In some cases, such as a target with plate armor, few weapons can do much damage directly. Only certain special hits can damage the target severely. But with time, even the most heavily armored Knight can usually be worn-down.

Unlike other systems, which use "hit points" to tally damage, DragonQuest has a two-tiered system of fatigue and endurance. Normally a weapon does fatigue damage only, but an especially lucky hit may immediately cause endurance damage or even a grievous injury, which allows the attacker to roll again on a table of nasty hits to the eyes, guts, etc. Once a character has lost all of his fatigue, he begins taking endurance damage instead. This is bad, since endurance damage requires magical intervention or extended bed rest to be recovered. Fatigue can be recovered by simply relaxing and getting a hot meal and a good night's sleep. Endurance damage may also increase susceptibility to infection, at the discretion of the referee.

Another DragonQuest feature is a three-tiered combat range system: Ranged, Melee, and Close Combat. Ranged Combat typically involves bows, slings, and thrown knives, while Melee is swords, spears, maces and most other weapons. Close Combat in DragonQuest is wrestling on the ground with knives, fists, rocks, etc. DragonQuest allows a party of adventurers to be surrounded and ultimately overwhelmed by large numbers of peasants, who rather than attacking singly and being cut to ribbons, will instead seek to surround and leap into Close Combat to subdue and pin down Player Characters. Some weapons, such as daggers, can be used at all ranges, but most cannot and are useless when the character is being shot with bows or engaged in Close Combat.

DragonQuest combat falls midway in complexity between D&D and systems such as Runequest or HârnMaster. It can take several hours to resolve battles. Tactics, choice of weapon, and use of spells are keys to victory. A feature of DragonQuest is that novice characters and mighty adventurers have nearly the same ability to absorb damage—i.e. they can both be killed fairly easily (unlike D&D in which high-level characters can take remarkable amounts of damage without dying, but similar to Runequest where character hit points are mostly static). This requires parties to have a balance of fighting and magic skills, since a party cannot be centered on a single nigh-invulnerable figure (a "Conan the Barbarian" type).

=== Experience ===
The experience points system enables characters to increase their skill levels in spells and vocation. Experience is used to 'purchase' new and improved abilities, rather than conferring a blanket increase in character skills as in D&D.

As characters grow in skills and proficiency, the cost to raise to higher skill levels increases greatly, but the amount of base experience points awarded at the successful completion of an adventure increases as well. In addition, the Dungeon Master may award characters bonus experience points for valiant, clever or outstanding performance during gameplay.

== Publication history ==
Through the 1970s, SPI was a board wargame publisher. With the sudden popularity of Dungeons & Dragons in the mid-1970s, SPI decided to enter the role-playing game market with a product called Dragonslayer, but changed the title to avoid a conflict with Walt Disney Pictures' 1981 movie of the same name. In 1981, SPI published the Dragonslayer board game, that was a licensed tie-in with the movie.

DragonQuest the role-playing game, published in 1980, was a boxed set of three softcover books designed by Eric Goldberg, David James Ritchie and Edward J. Woods, with interior artwork by John Garcia, and cover art by Jim Sherman.

In 1982, SPI published a second edition of DragonQuest in which the three books were consolidated into one book, which was published in conjunction with Bantam Books, shortly before SPI was unexpectedly taken over by TSR.

In 1988, TSR published the AD&D adventure, The Shattered Statue that included a conversion adventure to DragonQuest's second edition rules.

The following year, TSR published a third edition of DragonQuest with a revamped magic system, with game design by Gerard Christopher King, interior artwork by Timothy Truman and cover art by Joe Chiodo.

In 1986, Japanese companies Chunsoft and Enix released an unrelated videogame in Japan called Dragon Quest. When it was released in North America in 1989, Chunsoft changed the name to Dragon Warrior to avoid trademark issues. The trademark would later expire in the early 2000s and Square Enix would register the trademark for use in the US

Ownership of DragonQuest passed to Wizards of the Coast in 1997 following their takeover of TSR.

== Publications ==
=== Sourcebooks ===
- Frontiers of Alusia (1981)
- Gamemaster's Screen (1981)
- Heroes and Villains (1982)

=== Adventures ===
- The Blade of Allectus (1980)
- The Enchanted Wood (1981)
- The Palace of Ontoncle (1981)
- Magebird Quest (1982)
- Starsilver Trek (1982)

== Reception ==
In the September 1980 edition of The Space Gamer (Issue No. 31), Forrest Johnson liked the system despite some flaws. "Despite its faults, it still presents a pleasing contrast to the sloppiness of [The Fantasy Trip], the illogic of [Dungeons & Dragons], the incoherence of [Chivalry & Sorcery]. It borrows good ideas liberally from the older systems, and offers noteworthy innovations of its own... At [the price], DragonQuest is a terrific buy."

In the November 1980 edition of Dragon (Issue 43), Douglas Bachmann had issues with lack of balance in the skills system, but found the character generation system "a delight". Bachmann also liked the combat system. He concluded, "[DragonQuest] does have some problems, but I have found it to be an exciting game which has succeeded in setting limits and structuring activity while also encouraging creativity."

Michael A. Stackpole was more critical in his review for Different Worlds magazine, writing "DQ functions as a FRP game the same way a sledge hammer functions as a mousetrap. Both get the job done, but the effort involved in getting it to work is not worth the end result."

In Issue 31 of Phoenix, Terry Devereux called the combat system and character generation slightly better than the systems used in D&D/AD&D.

In the Summer 1984 issue of the French games magazine Casus Belli, Jean-Pierre Demange reviewed the TSR edition, and admired the many improvements that had been made to the original SPI product, commenting that it "aimed to correct the undeniable defects of the first edition, in order to arrive at a game whose flexibility of use should be the asset without degrading the realism dear to many." Demange found the character generation system very customizable, and the combat system a "rich experience from the multitude of possible actions." Demange concluded with a strong recommendation, saying, "DQ has many qualities and the flexibility of its rules framework allows everyone to correct the flaws and shortcomings inherent in all human creation."

In his 1990 book The Complete Guide to Role-Playing Games, game critic Rick Swan was impressed by the production values of the SPI edition game, but pointed out that "closer inspection revealed a lot of annoying rules [including] a tediously complicated combat system ... a dull selection of monsters ... and some just plain silly rules (if a male player wants to use a female character, he has to roll the dice for permission.)" Swan thought that the TSR edition addressed the game's deficiencies, making it "a polished and sophisticated fantasy RPG with one of gaming's best-ever magic systems." Swan concluded by giving the game a rating of 3 out of 4, saying, "The game ... desperately needs a more colorful setting. But for now, the future looks bright for DragonQuest."

In 1996, Heidi Kaye did a retrospective review of DragonQuest for Arcane magazine, stating that DragonQuest's system remains eminently playable.

In a retrospective review of DragonQuest in Black Gate, Ty Johnston said "DQ isn't for everyone. Patience is the key, and I realize that's easier said than done in today's busy world. Still, if you're looking for an old-school RPG that has deadly combat and is less limiting than player class systems, DragonQuest might be for you."

== Awards ==
At the 1981 Origins Awards. DragonQuest won the H.G. Wells Award for "Best Roleplaying Rules of 1980".
