= The Enchanted Wood (DragonQuest) =

- Designers: Paul Jaquays
- Publishers: Simulations Publications
- Publication: 1981; 45 years ago
- Genres: Fantasy
- Systems: Custom

The Enchanted Wood is a 1981 role-playing game adventure published by Simulations Publications for DragonQuest.

== Plot summary ==
The Enchanted Wood is a fantasy adventure in which the plants and animals of an enchanted forest have been altered by the magic of both good and evil force. The player characters must explore the 100-mile-wide wood, facing encounters that are determined through dice rolls, culminating in a quest to destroy the blight at its center. The game begins in a nearby city, where patrons — including an alchemist, a scholar, a trader, and a black mage — hire players for various missions. The forest contains randomized paths and encounters, including enchanted plants, supernatural weather, and unique locations like the Ruined Tower and Fairy Ring. Special encounters advance the plot, such as the Iron Axeman and the Pointing Ghost, who can become allies. The climax occurs at the Pillar of Karsus, the ruined City of Karse, and the tomb of Wulgreth, where adventurers confront the forces corrupting the wood. The scenario blends wilderness exploration with tactical combat.

A blight has corrupted the Enchanted Wood, altering its creatures with good or evil magic. The player characters must reach the heart of the forest to destroy its source. The scenario offers six potential starting points and numerous encounters.

== Publication history ==
The Enchanted Wood was written by Paul Jaquays, with art by Tim Truman, and published by Simulations Publications in 1981 as 48-page book.

This is the third adventure for DragonQuest.

== Reception ==
Anders Swenson reviewed The Enchanted Wood for Different Worlds magazine and stated that "objections aside, The Enchanted Wood remains a superior product, worth the money not only for the DragonQuest GM, but also for GMs who use other systems and who nevertheless want to purchase the occasional superior adventure to use with their own system."
