= Stargate Worlds =

- Developer: Cheyenne Mountain Entertainment
- Publisher: FireSky
- Engine: Unreal Engine 3
- Platform: Microsoft Windows
- Release: Cancelled
- Genre: MMORPG
- Mode: Multiplayer

Stargate Worlds (abbreviated as SGW) was to be a massively multiplayer online role-playing game (MMORPG) video game, but it was put on hold and never released. It was developed by Cheyenne Mountain Entertainment (CME) in association with Metro-Goldwyn-Mayer (MGM) and would have been published by FireSky for Microsoft Windows. The game's setting was based on the military science fiction series Stargate SG-1. The game was to focus on a premise set around an ancient device called the "Stargate".

In 2006, both CME and MGM announced the release of a video game set in the Stargate Universe. In 2008, FireSky announced its participation in the process of releasing Stargate Worlds. On March 25, 2010, FireSky announced on their website that CME/CMG had entered receivership. As a result, production on the game ceased. The estimated release date was never revealed before cancellation. The license agreement between CME and MGM expired on November 16, 2010, and the Stargate: Resistance servers shut down on January 15, 2011. In 2012 it was reported that development was cancelled with at least two investor lawsuits filed against the former chairman and CEO of CME, Gary Whiting, and other former executives.

== Development ==
CME and MGM announced in February 2006 that work had begun on a massively multiplayer online role-playing game (MMORPG). CME released several concept art images from Stargate Worlds in late 2006 along with announcing the use of Unreal Engine 3. This was also the first public release on the Stargate Worlds computer-generated art. In November, 2006 CME announced that Stargate Worlds had moved from pre-production to enter the production phase of the game's development. To celebrate this, they released new images for the game. The showrunners of Stargate SG-1 have been closely connected with the Stargate Worlds project including co-creator Brad Wright serving as a games creative consultant. Developer Chris Klug in an interview said that creating a game out of the Stargate Universe was easy because of the "breadth of content." Development progress for the game was reported to have slowed down drastically because of the Great Recession of 2007. FireSky had struck a deal with Convergys Corporation (CVG), which is a corporation leading in global relationship management. The company would provide the state-of-the-art customer support services for Stargate Worlds, to give the gamers their "best" gaming experience "ever".

In 2009, in an interview with GateWorld, Wright said he had doubts if the game would be released at all. Marketing manager from FireSky announced that the game was still in development, even if people said otherwise. He further stated that they were arranging deals to cover their financial responsibilities and fund the remainder of development of the video game.

Registrations were accepted for a closed beta version, with participants to be drawn randomly from the pool of registrants. Registration was limited to those aged 18 and over.

On February 12, 2010, CME filed for Chapter 11 bankruptcy with development on hold. The Stargate Worlds project was cancelled.

== Setting ==
Stargate Worlds was based on the popular science fiction show Stargate SG-1. The game was to take place in the earlier seasons of the show, before the Atlantis expedition and before the Ori story arc. The game would have explored the Furling, a race mentioned but not depicted in the show. The game's senior content designer Steve Garvin explained: "We had this whole idea for the Furling being a single entity that stretches across time, able to see the past and the future."

At release, the game would have revolved around the Milky Way Galaxy during the storyline of the ongoing conflict between the Tau'ri and the Goa'uld. Playable races were shown to include Tau'ri, Goa'uld, Jaffa, and the Asgard. The combat was designed to incorporate some elements that are familiar to players of first-person shooters, with players using an array of ranged weaponry of both earth and alien origin. Combat would have emphasized tactics to defeat opponents both AI and human controlled. The AI was being designed to provide players with a significant challenge, to the praise of many critics.

=== Archetypes ===
The archetypes in the game were designed to fit with the modern ranged-weapon combat system of the game. According to the developers there would be no specific healer class in the game, and all archetypes would have the ability to be a medic, although some archetypes would be better than others at healing and reviving. Specialization within the different archetypes would lead to more flexibility within a group. A robust tech tree would make each archetype that much more customizable and replayable.

The archetypes of Stargate Worlds, would according to the developers be "flexible" in their abilities and usage. Each archetype would have three specialization trees which would define a particular play style over time, although players would be able to mix and match skills from these. No end game instance would need a particular class to be successful.

With the game unreleased, major development was still being worked on with different archetypes that would be a subject to change. Both the scientist and the archaeologist would have specialized in non-combat gameplay with various types of puzzles to solve and gain access to new advances. In addition, there were likely to be quests specifically for those and other archetypes. Each archetype would have its own starting area. In addition to learning how to play the archetype, this starting zone would also give the player a backstory that comes from the first six seasons of Stargate SG-1.

- Archaeologists (Daniel Jackson archetype) would specialize in ancient cultures and languages. They would be able to 'blend in with the locals' to gather intelligence or ambush the enemy. This 'blending in' uses Asgard holographic technology to assume the appearance of others. It was assumed that the archaeologist would also be able to engage in diplomacy, something discussed by the developers previously. Archaeologists could also be quite adept in aggro management, perhaps by being superb negotiators or good at hiding, making them good solo characters, in addition to their ability to solve puzzles.
- Asgard would be physically frail, but would be masters of technology and would have a strong science ability. They depend on clone technology to survive and thrive. By calling upon different types of drones to attack, defend, heal, or analyze, the Asgard would be a true jack-of-all-trades. When faced with dire circumstances, the Asgard could also bring in their mighty starships to devastate the enemy with orbital bombardments in the form of a special attack. By being able to fit into a number of different roles, it was assumed the Asgard would choose their 'class' by specializing in a different type of drone technology. The Asgard would be a faction-specific class, thus there would not be any "evil" Asgard until the Atlantis Expansion was released.
- Goa'uld would gain much of their power from their servants. With the ability to command several different types of minions, the Goa'uld could become almost as versatile as the Asgard. These minions would include Jaffa and possibly human servants. In addition to their minions, Goa'ulds also have access to poisons that can be used to cripple enemies. They can also specialize in Ashrak technologies, such as phase cloaking, becoming masters of stealthy attacks. As the evil counterparts to the Asgard, the Goa'uld may be able to call in their Ha'tak bombers to bombard the enemy as a special attack. The Goa'uld character would be the symbiote and would at times and at a "cost" be able to choose to enter a new host. However player Goa'uld would not be able to take over other players' hosts.
- Jaffa (Teal'c archetype) in the game were much like the Jaffa in the show. In addition to its devastating ranged attack, the Jaffa staff weapon could also be used in melee combat. Displaying solidarity and teamwork, Jaffa could use their oaths to strengthen their allies, especially other Jaffa. With their physical strength, Jaffa were assumed to be highly resistant to special attacks and could continue fighting even when injured.
- Scientists (Samantha "Sam" Carter archetype) would be a combination of pure scientist and engineer. Scientists could specialize in analyzing, repairing, and using technologies. They could also use new technologies to craft personal upgrades. Their battlefield utility came from the ability to construct devices such as gun turrets, shields, and target inhibitors. They could also specialize in healing and resurrection technology. Like the archaeologist, the scientist could also solve puzzles, but of a technological nature. These puzzles would be in the form of minigames.
- Soldiers (Jonathan "Jack" O'Neill archetype) is valuable for protection when stepping through the stargate. With the ability to specialize in a variety of weapons, including grenades, automatic weapons, machine guns, mortars, and rocket launchers, their job was to unleash firepower on enemies. With additional training, they could also learn basic healing, how to use alien weaponry, and lead teams.
- Commando class would give up access to the variety of weapons a soldier class uses, a commando class gaining access to stealth, demolitions, and the sniper rifle. The commando could disrupt, confuse, and neutralize enemies. In addition to ability with stealth, commandos would also have technology to detect stealthed enemies. The commando would be at least one of the archetypes able to deploy and detect traps.

== Appearances in other media ==
Footage from the game was used in the opening sequence of the 2008 film WarGames: The Dead Code. Game footage is shown in the pilot episode of Stargate Universe when Eli enters the Ancient code in the online game Prometheus.
