= Stargate: Resistance =

2010 video game

- Developer(s): Dark Comet Games (2010); Cheyenne Mountain Entertainment (2009 - March 2010)
- Publisher(s): FireSky
- Engine: Unreal Engine 3
- Platform(s): Microsoft Windows
- Release: February 10, 2010
- Genre(s): Third-person shooter
- Mode(s): Single-player, multiplayer

Stargate: Resistance was an online third-person shooter owned and operated by the American studio Dark Comet Games, powered by the Unreal 3 engine, and based on the television series Stargate SG-1. It was originally released in 2010 by Firesky and Cheyenne Mountain Entertainment, however Cheyenne Mountain Entertainment went into receivership in March 2010 and Firesky entered into an agreement with Dark Comet Games for the maintenance, operation and development of Stargate Resistance. The game used a "buy to play" business model, with a one-off purchase fee and no monthly subscription fee. The game servers were shut down on January 15, 2011. A fan powered central server solution has been put in place, making the game once again playable.

== Plot ==
Stargate Resistance is set in the second decade of the Stargate Program, after the end of Stargate SG-1. Samantha Carter has been promoted to General according to an easter egg on the SGC level and is in charge of the Stargate program. Over the last decade, the SGC has spread Earth's influence throughout the galaxy, freeing enslaved peoples and developing a free Galactic culture of humanity once enslaved by the System Lords. But the System Lords do not accept this change in the status quo. Intent on regaining what they once held, the new System Lords are beginning an organized assault on key locations throughout the galaxy. Their goals are to drive out the SGC and re-enslave these "lost" populations.

The System Lords will not stop at conquering a handful of worlds. As their dominion increases they will push resistance all the way back to Earth, and enslave all of humanity. The SGC must defend each of these worlds, engaging the System Lords with carefully placed strike teams to preserve the peace.

== Overview ==
A screenshot from the game.

Stargate Resistance lets players take on the role of Stargate Command or the Goa'uld System Lords, with the fate of the galaxy in the balance.

Each of these two factions have three character classes: Soldiers, Commandos, and Scientists on the SGC side, and Goa'uld, Jaffa, and Ashrak assassins on the side of the System Lords. Each class has its own unique blend of weapons, items, and weaknesses, many of them iconic from the TV show such as the P90 or Staff Weapon. Players work with teammates in five multiplayer modes (up to 16 players at once): "Team Death Match," "Capture the Tech," "Domination," "Arena" and "King Of The Hill" over four maps, all but one of which has multiple game types available. The Galactic Struggle is represented by Domination Points earned in each match which contribute to buffs for the winning team. Additional game modes and maps, weapons and skins are planned in the future. The game is available for the PC only though expansion to a console platform is possible in the future. It will be open to future expansion packs.

"Resistance brings to our fans the kind of gameplay Stargate Worlds never planned to deliver," said Chris Klug, the game’s creative consultant and the creative director for Stargate Worlds. "Resistance delivers the combat, weapons and tactics seen so often on the show that many of you have been asking for. I know this game will excite fans who have longed to go toe-to-toe with a Jaffa as well as those who always wanted to dominate the galaxy in ways the MMO could only hint at."
