= Frontiers of Alusia =

Tabletop role-playing game supplement

- Publishers: Simulations Publications
- Publication: 1981; 44 years ago
- Genres: Fantasy
- Systems: Custom

Frontiers of Alusia is a 1981 role-playing game supplement for DragonQuest published by SPI.

== Contents ==
Frontiers of Alusia is a map of the wilderness showing the border areas on a continent, designed for DragonQuest, but usable with other fantasy systems.

== Reception ==
William A. Barton reviewed Frontiers of Alusia in The Space Gamer No. 42. Barton commented that "Frontiers of Alusia looks to be a handy playing aid for nearly any FRPG and should prove particularly useful to DragonQuest players looking for a setting for their campaign."
