= Stargate Project =

Stargate Project may refer to:

- Stargate Project (U.S. Army unit), a secret US Army unit established in 1977
- Stargate LLC, an American multinational artificial intelligence joint venture founded in 2025

== See also ==
- Stargate, an American military science fiction media franchise initially released in 1994
- Stargate (disambiguation)
