= A Burning Passion: The Margaret Mitchell Story =

1994 American TV series or program

- DVD cover
- Genre: Biography drama
- Written by: Robert Hamilton
- Directed by: Larry Peerce
- Starring: Shannen Doherty
- Theme music composer: Billy Goldenberg
- Country of origin: United States
- Original language: English

Production
- Executive producers: Robert Hamilton; Renée Valente
- Producer: Harker Wade
- Production locations: Bradbury Building; Duke University; Wilmington, North Carolina
- Cinematography: Don E. FauntLeRoy
- Editor: Paul LaMastra
- Running time: 95 minutes
- Production companies: FNV Inc. NBC Productions; Renée Valente Productions

Original release
- Network: NBC
- Release: November 7, 1994

A Burning Passion: The Margaret Mitchell Story is a 1994 biographical television film directed by Larry Peerce. The film is about the early life of Pulitzer Prize-winning novelist Margaret Mitchell, who rose to fame after publishing Gone with the Wind.

The film was praised by critics, with them especially complimenting Memphis, Tennessee-born Shannen Doherty's Old Southern accent.

== Plot ==
Margaret grows up to become a respectable lady in the South, just like her mother May Belle. She wants to become a writer, but her feminist mother insists on her becoming a female doctor. May Belle puts a lot of pressure on her daughter, forcing her to be the best in everything. This results in Margaret never being able to satisfy her mother. When she has become a young lady, all the boys want to be with her, but Margaret only has eyes for Clifford West Henry, a young man from a good family from New York.

They fall in love, but their relationship is cut short when Clifford is sent to France with the Army and succumbs to his injuries following a German bombing. Margaret is sent to Smith College by her mother, where she studies medicine. She loathes it, though, and only thinks about getting back to Clifford. When she receives a phone call that he has died in a French hospital, she is crushed. A month later, her mother dies in the influenza epidemic of 1918. Margaret returns home.

She chooses to stay home and care for her father and find her place in Atlanta society. She attempts to gain full membership in the Atlanta Junior League. She is refused, however, when she shocks everybody with a sensual dance. Red Upshaw and John Marsh notice Margaret and are immediately drawn to her. At first she is not too impressed with the womanizer Red, knowing he earns his money by bootlegging. However, their dislike soon turns into love, and together they enjoy the wild life of the Jazz Age.

When their engagement is announced, Margaret's family make clear they are against it. The pair still decide to marry, but their marriage is troubled from the start. Red decides to quit his job, so Margaret applies to a newspaper to earn money. She is hired as an interviewer, but does not impress her boss. After gaining more experience, she turns out to be a highly respected reporter.

When Red leaves for Texas, Margaret decides to stay to focus on her career. He returns seven months later and thinks she is having an affair with John. They fight, and Red eventually beats Margaret up severely. The next day, John gives Red money to leave town and never come back. He provides Margaret with a gun to defend herself if Red returns. Margaret and John soon start a relationship and are married in 1925.

By this time, Margaret is working on her first novel, Gone with the Wind. When it is published into a novel, it becomes a huge success. Her fame and money do not do much for her marriage and she soon is estranged from John. When she least expects it, Red visits her, regaining peace after their fight. Red announces that he is getting married soon. The end credits say that Red committed suicide not much later, and that Margaret died in 1949, after being struck by a reckless driver.

== Cast ==
- Shannen Doherty as Margaret Mitchell
- Dale Midkiff as Red Upshaw
- Matt Mulhern as John Marsh
- Stephen Michael Ayers as Eugene Mitchell
- Ann Wedgeworth as Mrs. O'Flaherty
- Morgan Weisser as Clifford
- John Clark Gable, Senior as Army Officer Terry
- Rue McClanahan as Grandma Stephens
- Megan Drye (Harper) as Young Margaret

== Production ==
Doherty was cast in the lead and title role. To play the role as realistic as possible, she read every book about the writer and saw the film Gone with the Wind (1939). The film was shot on location in Wilmington, North Carolina between August and September 1994. The film was released a few days before the premiere of Scarlett, the sequel of Gone with the Wind.
