= Mary Melanie Holliday =

American Catholic nun

Mary Melanie Holliday RSM
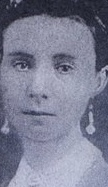
- Holliday prior to her life in the convent
- Church: Roman Catholic Church

Personal details
- Born: Martha Ann Holliday; December 14, 1850 Jonesboro, Georgia, U.S.
- Died: April 19, 1939 (aged 88) Atlanta, Georgia, U.S.
- Parents: Robert Kennedy Holliday; Mary Anne Fitzgerald
- Occupation: Religious sister

Mary Melanie Holliday RSM (born Martha Ann Holliday; December 14, 1850 – April 19, 1939) was an American Catholic religious sister. As a member of the Sisters of Mercy, she served as Mother superior at the Convent and Academy of St. Vincent de Paul in Savannah and at the Convent of the Immaculate Conception in Atlanta. While living in the convent in Savannah, she worked as a schoolteacher in the affiliated academy. When Holliday moved to the convent in Atlanta, she worked as a nurse at St. Joseph's Infirmary.

== Biography ==
Holliday was born Martha Ann Holliday in Jonesboro, Georgia on December 14, 1850. She was one of eight children of Captain Robert Kennedy Holliday, a Confederate military officer and quartermaster who served in the 7th Georgia Infantry during the American Civil War, and Mary Anne Fitzgerald, whose family owned Rural Home Plantation. She was a cousin of the gambler and gunfighter John Henry "Doc" Holliday and of the landowner and businesswoman Annie Fitzgerald Stephens. She had a close relationship with Doc Holliday, frequently writing to him throughout her life.

During the Civil War, Holliday and her mother and siblings took refuge in Valdosta on the farm of her uncle, Henry Burroughs Holliday. They stayed in Valdosta from October 1864 until the war ended in May 1865.

She entered the Sisters of Mercy at the Convent and Academy of St. Vincent de Paul in Savannah, Georgia in 1883, taking the religious name Mary Melanie, after Saint Melania the Younger. She was a member of the congregataion for 56 years. After living in the convent in Savannah, she taught at Sacred Heart School in Augusta and later became the mother superior there. She then served as superior of the Convent of the Immaculate Conception in Atlanta and worked as a nurse at St. Joseph's Infirmary. She was often visited by her second cousin Maybelle Stephens Mitchell and her cousin's daughter Margaret Mitchell. Holliday is believed to be the inspiration behind the character Melanie Hamilton, and possibly Carreen O'Hara, in the novel Gone With the Wind.

She died at the age of 88 at St. Joseph's Infirmary, and she is buried in the Sisters of Mercy lot in Westview Cemetery.
