= Joseph Mitchell (Mitchell Estate director) =

American philanthropist and heir

Joseph "Joe" R. Mitchell
- Born: February 27, 1935
- Died: October 11, 2011 (aged 76); Atlanta, Georgia
- Citizenship: American
- Education: Masters in English Literature
- Alma mater: University of Georgia; Georgetown University
- Known for: Co-executor of Margaret Mitchell's estate
- Relatives: Margaret Mitchell (aunt); Eugene Mitchell (grandfather); Maybelle Stephens Mitchell (grandmother); Annie Fitzgerald Stephens (great-grandmother)

Joseph Reynolds Mitchell (February 27, 1935 – October 11, 2011) was an American heir and philanthropist; one of the two nephews of Margaret Mitchell, author of Gone with the Wind; and the last family member to control the Mitchell Estate.

== Inheritance ==
Upon Margaret's death on August 16, 1949, her two nephews Eugene Mitchell (April 6, 1931 - August 8, 2007) and Joseph Mitchell inherited $500 each from her estate. Mitchell was fourteen years old at the time and later stated he was in his thirties before he read Gone with the Wind. John R. Marsh, Margaret's husband, gained the rights to the estate upon her death. When Marsh died in 1952, the rights passed to Margaret's brother Stephens Mitchell, and then when he died the rights passed to Eugene and Joseph.

When Mitchell and brother Eugene inherited the estate, it was worth multi-millions. Mitchell was not a public figure, however, and stayed out of the limelight that came with the inheritance.

== Life ==
Joseph Reynolds "Joe" Mitchell was born the second son of Stephens and Carolyn Reynolds Mitchell in Atlanta, Georgia, on February 27, 1935. He was the nephew of author Margaret Mitchell, the grandson of suffragist and Catholic activist Maybelle Stephens Mitchell and lawyer Eugene Mitchell, and the great-grandson of businesswoman and landowner Annie Fitzgerald Stephens. His Fitzgerald ancestors owned Rural Home, a large plantation in Clayton County.

Mitchell attended the University of Georgia for his undergraduate studies in literature, then went on to Georgetown University in Washington, D.C. for his Master's Degree in English Literature. After graduating, he worked at the MGM publicity office in New York for two years, but after this stint did not work regularly until his death. His closest friends were listed in England, and he traveled to Europe as often as twice a year.

Like his older brother Eugene, Mitchell had no children and died from complications with diabetes at the age of 76 on October 11, 2011. He was survived by several cousins and his sister-in-law Virginia Mitchell.

== Legacy ==
Mitchell bequeathed 50 percent of trademark and literary rights of the Mitchell Estate to the Archdiocese of Atlanta, along with personal items of Margaret's. Some of the items included a collection of signed Gone with the Wind first editions published in various languages in countries around the world; an unpublished history of the Mitchell family, handwritten by Margaret's father, Eugene Muse Mitchell; Margaret's wallet, press card and library card; furniture from her apartment; a library of books, including signed first editions of the late Georgia Catholic author Flannery O'Connor's novels and short stories. He also donated millions of dollars and his home on Habersham Road in Atlanta to the archdiocese. The archdiocese set aside $7.5 million for the cathedral’s building fund, $3.75 million to Catholic Charities and other service groups, and several million more went to disadvantaged parishes, parish endowments, a retirement fund for priests, and a Jesuit high school.

Deacon Steve Swope of the archdiocese stated of Mitchell "His mission was to protect the dignity of the work, and we are going to carry that on. We are going to fiercely protect it from infringement. We have an obligation to do that." Swope continued with "I am probably more a fan of Margaret Mitchell and Joseph Mitchell, since I have learned so much about them through this process. Margaret's simplicity and humility are pretty well known, and now Joseph will be remembered for his simplicity and generosity. Margaret's legacy is the greatest novel written about the South during the time of the Civil War. Joseph's legacy is the help he has provided to so many through his generous nature. For me, while Gone With the Wind is great, Margaret and Joseph Mitchell through their actions are far greater."

Mitchell was posthumously mentioned in the press in early April, 2014, when the Atlanta Catholic Church was caught up in a scandal. Archbishop Wilton D. Gregory of Georgia came under media scrutiny for building a $2.2 million mansion on land donated by Mitchell with funds earmarked for charitable donations and religious purposes. Originally Mitchell's one-story home had been on the property, but it was razed to make room for the mansion. Mitchell's land contributions in relation to the mansion were mentioned in CNN, the Washington Post, Boston Globe, Huffington Post, and many other outlets.
