= Tara (fictional plantation) =

Fictional plantation

Tara is a fictional plantation in the state of Georgia, in the historical novel Gone with the Wind (1936) by Margaret Mitchell. In the story, Tara is located 5 miles (8 km) from Jonesboro (originally spelled Jonesborough), in Clayton County, on the east side of the Flint River about 20 miles (32 km) south of Atlanta.

Mitchell modeled Tara after local plantations and antebellum establishments, particularly Rural Home, the Clayton County plantation on which her maternal grandmother, Annie Fitzgerald Stephens (1844–1934), the daughter of Irish immigrant Philip Fitzgerald (1798–1880) and his American wife, Eleanor Avaline "Ellen" McGhan (1818–1893), was born and raised. However, the original Rural Home, a two-story wooden structure, was not as palatial and glamorous as the one described in the novel or that depicted in the 1939 movie Gone with the Wind.

Twelve Oaks, a neighboring plantation in the novel, is now the name of many businesses and a high school stadium in nearby Lovejoy, Georgia.

== In Gone with the Wind ==
In Gone with the Wind, Tara was founded by Irish immigrant Gerald O'Hara after he won 640 acres (2.6 km^{2}) or one square mile of land from its absentee owner during an all-night poker game. An Irish peasant farmer rather than the merchant his elder brothers (whose emigrations to Savannah had brought him to Georgia) wanted him to be, Gerald relished the thought of becoming a landed gentleman and gave his mostly wilderness and uncultivated new lands the grandiose name of Tara after the Hill of Tara, once the capital of the High King of ancient Ireland. He borrowed money from his brothers and bankers to buy slaves and turned the farm into a very successful cotton plantation. Gerald realized that the manor house needed a 'feminine' touch and domestic servants. Consulting with his valet, Pork, whom he had won in a card game, he was told, "whut you needs is a wife, and a wife whut has got plen'y of house niggers." So Gerald set off to Savannah to look for a wife meeting this qualification.

At 43, Gerald married the 15-year-old Ellen Robillard, a wealthy Savannah-born girl of French descent, receiving as dowry twenty slaves (including 'Mammy', Ellen's nurse, who became nurse to Ellen's daughters and grandchildren as well). His young bride took a very real interest in the management of the plantation, being in some ways a more hands-on manager than her husband. With the injection of her dowry money and the rise of cotton prices, Tara grew to a plantation of more than 1,000 acres (4.0 km^{2}) and more than 100 slaves by the dawn of the Civil War.

In the first quarter of the novel, the O'Haras are enthusiastically partisan in support of the Confederacy. Nevertheless, even before the tide has turned irreversibly against the Confederacy following Gettysburg and Vicksburg, the plantation (along with the other great land-holdings in the county) has already suffered major deprivation because of the war and has descended into disrepair. Shortages caused by the Union blockade and the Confederate requisitioning of supplies and slaves have turned the home from a house of plenty to one of mere subsistence, while the inability to export their cotton to England has also greatly diminished the family's once-lavish income and lifestyle. The arrival of Sherman's troops in Clayton County terrifies those slaves who have not already fled, or been conscripted into the labor force by the Confederacy. By the time Union troops arrive at Tara, only the house slaves remain.

Unlike the homes of most of the O'Haras' neighbors, Tara is spared the torch during the Union's scorched earth policy. The life-threatening illness, from typhoid, of Ellen O'Hara and her younger daughters, Suellen and Carreen, causes Gerald to stand firm in the doorway of his house, "as if he had an army behind him rather than before him", and earns the sympathy of a Union officer who orders his surgeon to treat the O'Hara women with laudanum and quinine. The officer commandeers the house for use as a Union field headquarters, but as a courtesy, it is spared. However, movable items of value (including Ellen's rosary, pictures, and china) are confiscated (or stolen), and larger items are vandalized by the withdrawing Union troops. Mammy hides the family silver in the well.

The army also chops down the trees surrounding the home, destroys the outbuildings, uses much of the fencing for firewood, slaughters the livestock, and pillages the vegetable gardens and fruit orchards for its own use. The most expensive blow comes when the troops torch more than $158,331 worth of baled cotton (in 2014 currency). (The O'Haras had been unable to sell the cotton to English merchants, owing to the blockade, and thus it was still awaiting transport.) Upon the army's withdrawal, the family and their loyal remaining slaves are left with a looted and dilapidated house, a ruined farm with no stock, work animals, or farm equipment, no food and no means to produce food. They are indigent and soon starving.

Ellen O'Hara dies soon after the Union evacuation, and her widowed oldest daughter Scarlett returns a day later, her initial delight at finding the house still standing soon turning to despair at its ruination. The loss of his wife, combined with hopelessness, poverty, age, and an increasing reliance on whiskey (when it is available) is destroying Gerald O'Hara's sanity, leaving him a demented echo of his former self. The plantation and house continue to be visited by both rebel and Union troops throughout the war, both sides taking any remnants of food and items of value left to the family.

Scarlett, however, leads her complaining sister Suellen, and semi-stunned and emotionally numb sister Carreen, and the house slaves (all unaccustomed to hard manual labor), in harvesting the remaining cotton plants. She manages to salvage a few hundred pounds of the crop (enough to trade for food, perhaps) but sees her labor rendered useless when a small detachment of Union troops finds the cotton in a slave cabin and sets it ablaze. When one of the soldiers is prevented, by his commanding officer, from taking a gilded sword that once belonged to Scarlett's long-dead father-in-law and intended for her little boy Wade Hamilton (the officer is himself a veteran of the same campaigns as the sword's former owner), the thwarted Yankee soldier expresses his indignation by secretly setting a wing of the house on fire as the Yankees are leaving. The family – which at this point, includes the convalescent Melanie Wilkes, Scarlett's sister-in-law by her marriage to her first husband (Melanie's dead brother Charles Hamilton) – extinguishes the flames before they can spread, but the mansion is further damaged.

When a Union deserter attempts to rob and rape Scarlett, she kills him in self-defense and vengeance. With the tiny windfall of money he was carrying, and with his horse and the aid of Will Benteen, a Confederate private and amputee nursed through a near-fatal fever by the O'Haras, the land is planted once again, on a subsistence scale. The family is able to eke out a very meager living, leaving them constantly hungry but at least not homeless or starving.

Peace returns after the war, but not prosperity. Scarlett manages to save Tara from being seized and the family from dispossession only by deceitfully marrying her sister Suellen's fiancé, Frank Kennedy, and using his savings to pay the $300 in taxes levied on the place. Though Scarlett returns to Atlanta where her fortunes rise as she takes over and expands her second husband Frank's business interests, she shares her new wealth with Tara. Tara never achieves anything like its antebellum grandeur, but it does become self-supporting as a "two horse" farm. While far from rich, the O'Haras are at least in better condition than most of their neighbors. While Scarlett is in Atlanta, Suellen, the sister whom Scarlett's husband truly loved, conspires with the hated carpetbaggers and scalawags to defraud the victorious United States government of $150,000 by having her senile father swear an oath that his family was pro-Union during the war; therefore, the cotton burned and the damages done to the place were not justified. The plan backfires and leads to the accidental death of Gerald. It also leads to the social ostracism of Suellen by her neighbors and even some of her relatives, though ironically it increases her worth (slightly) in the eyes of her pragmatic sister Scarlett, who privately believes the plan was brilliant.

In 1868, Scarlett marries Rhett Butler, a wealthy gambler and profiteer. Rhett has Tara restored the way it was before the war, but the couple also have a house built in Atlanta. Though Scarlett resides in Atlanta, she considers Tara her true home. The house is restored and refurnished, the outbuildings are rebuilt, the fields are again stocked with cattle, turkeys, and horses, and the land is again planted with cotton (raised now by poor white and free black sharecroppers). By the end of the novel, Tara has come to resemble, as closely as it can, the beautiful red-earthed plantation it was before the war. Scarlett, however, is unable to find peace or happiness. Though she has come back from defeat and starvation to become one of the wealthiest women in the South and is even far richer and more spoiled than she ever expected to be, she feels miserable and empty. Most of this is due to, first, her hopeless love for Ashley Wilkes, and later her loss of Rhett's love (unfortunately, after realizing Rhett is the one she loves), and the death of their daughter Bonnie (and perhaps her loss of Melanie's friendship through her death, as well). After Rhett leaves Scarlett, she returns to Tara, declaring that she will win back his love one day.

Some critics state that Tara ultimately symbolizes Scarlett's spirit or character. Initially, it is a thing of pompous but shallow beauty, then a place of desolation but nevertheless still standing when the neighboring homes are not, and finally as beautiful as ever but bereft of life and happiness.

== In Rhett Butler's People ==
In the 2007 novel by Donald McCaig, Rhett Butler's People, Tara stays virtually the same as in Gone With the Wind. However, at the end of this novel, which was the authorized Margaret Mitchell estate sequel to Gone With the Wind, the crazed Isaiah Watling sets fire to the main staircase of the mansion, which burns to the ground.

== The house ==
When Gerald first takes possession of the property, he and his slave valet Pork (also acquired by Gerald in a poker game) inhabit the four-room overseer's house that remained standing after the former mansion burned down. The enslaved population builds Tara on the site of the old house and add to it as is necessary. It is a clumsy sprawling building of whitewashed brick and timber "built according to no architectural plan whatever, with extra rooms added where and when it seemed convenient". Its charm comes from Ellen's grace and sophistication. According to the description in the novel, the house has at least two hallways, a cellar, front and back stairs, and an attic.

== Movie set ==
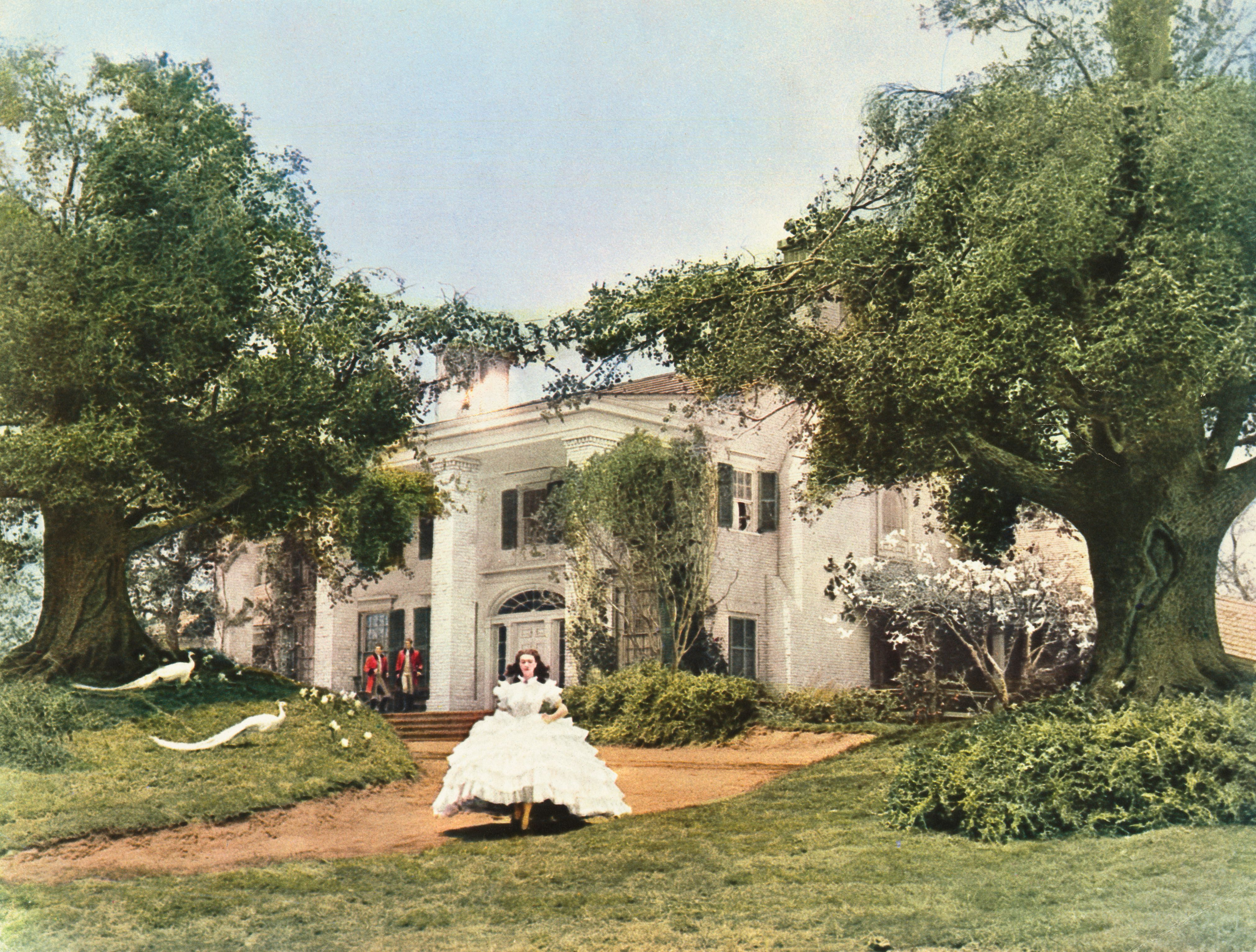
Tara in the film Gone with the Wind, with Scarlett O'Hara (Vivien Leigh) in the foreground

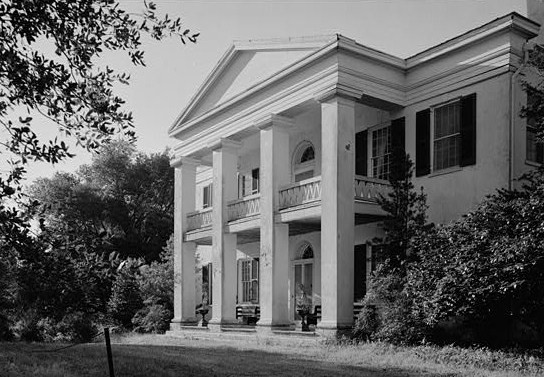
Monmouth, which inspired the exterior of Tara in the film

In summer 1937 Margaret Mitchell and her friend, midwesterner William G. Kurtz Sr., toured antebellum houses in Clayton County, Georgia, which is where her great-grandparents Phillip and Eleanor Fitzgerald had raised their seven daughters. The Fitzgeralds had built "Rural Home," a four-room, wood-framed Federal-style house in 1831. Mitchell considered it architecturally unplanned and vernacular, and described it as "ugly, like Alex Stephens' Liberty Hall." Selznick, however, wanted something more glamorous, Mitchell "politely bowed out of the production of the movie", and Selznick hired Kurtz as technical advisor. Selznick also asked art director Joseph B. Platt and researcher Lillian Deighton to look at the mansions in the vicinity of Natchez, Mississippi. They were initially inspired by the Greek Revival-style Belmont house on Liberty Road, with its tree-shaded entrance road. The "ecology" of the movie was changed to match Natchez rather than northwest Georgia, so that southern live oaks and flat cotton fields replaced cedars and rolling hills. However, set designers Lyle R. Wheeler and William C. Menzies, using Historical American Buildings Survey reports, favored the design of the suburban villa Monmouth, and created an "edited and simpler version of the Monmouth portico" for Scarlett O'Hara and the Tarleton boys to use for flirting. The interior was influenced by the center halls at Arlington and Rosalie, "which went through the entire building and had a front and rear door and a porch." Even though the white women preservationists active in Natchez during the Great Depression "had set out to create a Natchez narrative that celebrated its Spanish colonial history" to market their impoverished and isolated community, "Natchez became the embodiment of the 'Old South' after the movie adaptation of Gone With the Wind.

For the 1939 motion picture, the home was constructed by art director Lyle Wheeler. After filming concluded, the façade of Tara sat on the Forty Acres backlot owned by RKO Pictures and then Desilu Productions. The Tara house façade looks very similar to the home of Barbara Stanwyck's character Victoria Barkley in the ABC series The Big Valley. That set was built in 1947 on the Republic Studios lot in Encino for the John Wayne movie The Fighting Kentuckian. In 1959, Southern Attractions, Inc. purchased the Tara façade, which was dismantled and shipped to Georgia with plans to relocate it to the Atlanta area as a tourist attraction. Producer David O. Selznick commented at the time,

Nothing in Hollywood is permanent. Once photographed, life here is ended. It is almost symbolic of Hollywood. Tara had no rooms inside. It was just a façade. So much of Hollywood is a façade.

However, the Margaret Mitchell estate refused to license anything that sought to capitalize on the novel's fame and popularity, including the movie set, citing Mitchell's dismay at how little it resembled her description in her novel.

In 1979, what remained of the set—doorway, windows, shutters, cornice, steps and breezeway to the kitchen, and elements of the kitchen itself—was purchased for $5,000 (~$22,180 in 2025) by Betty Talmadge, the former wife of former governor and U.S. Senator Herman Talmadge. She had the front door of the Tara set restored. After a 1989 exhibit at the Atlanta History Center, she lent it for permanent display at the Margaret Mitchell House and Museum in Midtown Atlanta, Georgia.

A short time later, K. C. Bassham, an inn owner in Concord, Georgia, agreed to purchase the set from Mrs. Talmadge and actually took possession of a window and shutter from the set. Bassham set up her inn as a period piece and decorated it with reproduction mementos from the film. In spite of the restored front door and fanlight, she believed that the movie set, which she characterized as "plywood and papier-mâché," was so deteriorated that it could never be resurrected again. Her vision was to cut up the set and sell 1-by-3-inch (25 mm × 76 mm) rectangular sections along with a picture of Tara and a certificate of authenticity. Talmadge eventually decided to keep the Tara set, and it remained in storage at the time of her death in 2005.

For years the set was also thought to have existed on Metro-Goldwyn-Mayer's backlot #2 in Culver City, CA. This urban myth was the result of former MGM tour guides who had been instructed to mislead tourists into thinking that a southern mansion set on backlot #2 was the famed Gone with the Wind set. In fact, years later an article in the Los Angeles Times chronicled the demolition of the mansion and relied on the false information given by the tour guides. This news report only furthered the confusion over the true whereabouts of the actual Tara set. The Tara facade is still located at Talmadge Farms in Lovejoy, Georgia.

== Namesakes ==
- The section of US 41 and US 19 from Interstate 75 south through Jonesboro to the Clayton/Henry county line is called Tara Boulevard, in honor of the book and movie, and the placement of the fictitious plantation near the town. The Tara Field airport (located in Henry but once operated by Clayton) was also named for it. It has since been changed to Atlanta Speedway Airport [KHMP].
- The Tara Theatre, an art house movie theater in Atlanta, memorializes the plantation.
- Tara High School in Baton Rouge, Louisiana.
- The Tara ceiling fan by Southern Fan Company
- Tara from True Blood

== Sources ==
- Kapp, Paul Hardin (2022). Heritage and Hoop Skirts: How Natchez Created the Old South. Jackson: University Press of Mississippi. ISBN 978-1-4968-3879-7. LCCN 2022014500. OCLC 1311168633.
