= Eugene Mitchell =

American politician, lawyer, and historian

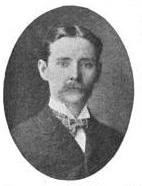
- Mitchell in 1906

President of the Atlanta Board of Education
- In role 1911–1912

Personal details
- Born: Eugene Muse Mitchell; October 13, 1866 Atlanta, Georgia, U.S.
- Died: June 17, 1944 (aged 77) Atlanta, Georgia, U.S.
- Resting place: Oakland Cemetery
- Spouse: Mary Isabel Stephens
- Children: 3 (including Margaret Mitchell)
- Parent(s): Russel Crawford Mitchell; Deborah Margaret Sweet
- Relatives: Joseph Mitchell (grandson)
- Education: University of Georgia
- Occupation: lawyer, historian

Eugene Muse Mitchell (October 13, 1866 – June 17, 1944) was an American lawyer, politician, and historian. He served as the President of the Atlanta Board of Education from 1911 to 1912, during which time he eliminated the use of corporal punishment in city schools. He owned a law firm in Atlanta, and was a co-founder of the Atlanta Historical Society. He was married to the prominent Catholic activist and suffragist Maybelle Stephens Mitchell and was the father of Margaret Mitchell, who wrote the novel Gone With the Wind.

== Family background and early life ==
Mitchell was from a prominent Georgia family descended from Thomas Mitchell, a colonial land surveyor originally from Aberdeenshire in Scotland who settled in Wilkes County in 1777 and served in the American Revolutionary War. His great-grandfather, William Mitchell, was born in Edgefield County, South Carolina and owned a farm near Flat Rock. His grandfather, Issac Green Mitchell, farmed in Flat Rock before selling his property to Ira O. McDaniel and purchasing a farm on the north side of the South River in DeKalb County.

His father was Russel Crawford Mitchell, a wealthy lawyer and lumber industrialist who served in the Texas Brigade, an infantry formation of the Confederate States Army during the American Civil War. He was severely wounded at the Battle of Sharpsburg and demoted for "inefficiency", later serving as a nurse in Atlanta. After the war, he made a large fortune supplying lumber for the rebuilding of Atlanta, which had been largely destroyed during the Battle of Atlanta, becoming one of the richest men in Atlanta and serving as the city's mayor. His mother was Deborah Margaret Sweet, the daughter of William Charles Sweet and Mary Ann McKenzie and the granddaughter of Rev. Gospero Sweet and Ann Munnerlyn, who was from Quincy, Florida and met his father while serving as a nurse during the war.

Mitchell was born on October 13, 1866, in Atlanta, the eldest of eleven children. He was educated at Means High School, where he was an exceptional student but often got into fights. He was an undergraduate at the University of Georgia, where he was a member of Phi Beta Kappa, and graduated with the university's highest recorded grade point average at that time. He graduated with honors from the University of Georgia School of Law in 1886.

== Marriage, family life, and career ==
He married Mary Isabel "Maybelle" Stephens, the daughter of Captain John Stephens and Annie Fitzgerald Stephens of Rural Home Plantation, at her family's Jackson Street mansion on November 8, 1892. The wedding was reported in The Atlanta Constitution. Although raised Protestant, and married to a devout Catholic, Mitchell was not fond of organized religion and, despite agreeing to baptize and raise his children in the Catholic faith, he had disdain for the Catholic Church.

In 1893, he opened a law office with his brother, Gordon Forrest Mitchell. The firm was later renamed Mitchell & Mitchell when his son joined him at the practice.

Mitchell and his wife had three children, Russell Stephens Mitchell, Margaret Mitchell, and Alexander Stephens Mitchell. Their first child, Russell, died in infancy. The Mitchells first lived in a two-story, six-room frame cottage at 296 Cain Street in an affluent part of Atlanta inhabited by old families, where all of their children were born. The family was very wealthy and had many servants. They lived a few doors down from the palatial city residence of his mother-in-law, Annie, and near many of his wife's relatives. Mitchell took his family on annual vacations to New York City or Boston, and sometimes they visited Albany by sailing up the Hudson River in a steamship.

In 1902 Mitchell moved his family into a large house on the corner of Jackson Street and Highland Avenue in the affluent Jackson Hill neighborhood. A year later, as his law practice prospered, he moved the family into a large, twelve-room, brick Victorian mansion at 179 Jackson Street. The house had a large front porch and was shaded by giant oak trees. At the bottom of Jackson Hill was an African-American neighborhood called Darktown, where some of the Atlanta Race Riot of 1906 occurred. Mitchell was awakened by the sounds of gunshots the night the riot began and wrote to his wife, who was away, the following morning stating, "sixteen negros had been killed and a multitude had been injured" and that "rioters killed or tried to kill every Negro they saw." As the rioting continued, with an angry mob of 10,000 white people assembling in the streets beating and killing black people, false rumors began spreading that black men were assaulting white women and would potentially burn down Jackson Hill. At his daughter Margaret's suggestion, Mitchell stood guard of his home with a sword, as he did not own a gun. No attack occurred on the Mitchell home.

In 1909, Mitchell purchased a large lot at 1149 on Peachtree Street, where he built a two-story Colonial Revival mansion with terraces. The family moved into the house in 1912, which had a parlor, a sitting room, a music room, a dining room, a large kitchen, a pantry, a large front entrance hall, and upstairs bedrooms that opened out onto porches. Their former home on Jackson Street was destroyed in the Great Atlanta Fire of 1917.

Mitchell served as president of the Atlanta Board of Education from 1911 to 1912, during which he abolished corporal punishment in public schools. He was a co-founder of the Atlanta Historical Society.

He died on June 17, 1944, in Atlanta and is buried in Oakland Cemetery.
