= Monmouth (Natchez, Mississippi) =

- U.S. National Register of Historic Places
- U.S. National Historic Landmark
- Mississippi Landmark
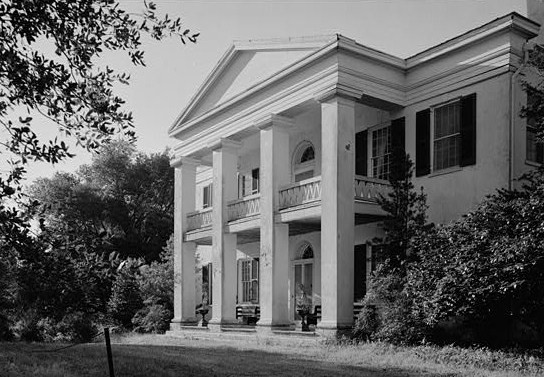
- Monmouth in 1962

- Location within Mississippi Location within the United States
- Location: 1358 John A. Quitman Boulevard, Natchez, Mississippi
- Coordinates: 31.553296°N 91.386844°W
- Area: 26 acres (11 ha)
- Built: 1818
- Architectural style: Greek Revival
- NRHP reference No.: 73001001
- USMS No.: 001-NAT-4018-NHL-ML

Significant dates
- Added to NRHP: April 26, 1973
- Designated NHL: June 7, 1988
- Designated USMS: October 17, 1986

Monmouth is a historic Greek Revival mansion in Natchez, Mississippi. It was built in 1818 by John Hankinson, and renovated about 1853 by John A. Quitman, a former soldier, governor of Mississippi, and military adventurer. The house was declared a Mississippi Landmark in 1986 and a National Historic Landmark in 1988. It inspired the exterior design of Tara in the film Gone with the Wind. It is now a small luxury hotel.

== History ==
=== John and Francing Hankinson ===
The home was built by John Hankinson, a postmaster, lawyer and steamboat entrepreneur, during the depression that followed the War of 1812, and named after his home, Monmouth County, New Jersey. The mansion was a brick two-story in the Federal style, with a wide central hall with four rooms located off the hall on both floors. There was also a detached brick kitchen behind it, a garden house, and several outhouses. Hankinson and his wife died soon after completing the house and the house was sold at a public auction to Calvin Smith, who one year later sold the property to John Anthony Quitman, the future Governor of Mississippi.

=== John and Eliza Quitman ===
John Quitman, born September 1, 1798 in Rhinebeck, NY to the Rev. Frederick H. Quitman and Anna Elizabeth Quitman, was a partner in a successful Natchez law firm and married Eliza Turner, a member of one of the most prominent families in the city, being the niece of Edward Turner, a Mississippi Supreme Court judge. Quitman purchased Monmouth in 1826 for his wife and growing family. The house was extensively renovated by the Quitmans in 1853 in the fashionable Greek Revival style. The original brick was covered by stucco, scored to look like stone, and the portico was added to the front, along with the four square columns supporting it. Quitman also added the rear gallery and southeast wing of the house, along with a second story for the detached kitchen.

After Quitman died at Monmouth on July 17, 1858, and his wife died a year later, their five daughters and one son inherited the plantation. In 1862, when Natchez was attacked by the Union army during the American Civil War, most of the slaves fled. Most of Quitman's original possessions were either stolen in 1863, when the house was occupied by Union soldiers, or sold by Quitman's daughters in 1865 due to financial difficulty. The house was spared from further damage during the war, as the daughters befriended a Union general and pledged loyalty to the United States. In 1866, three of the daughters, Louisa, Annie Rosalie and Fredericka, purchased their siblings' share of the property, and by 1890, Annie Rosalie was the sole owner of Monmouth. In 1914, when she died, the house was left to her nieces, who later sold it in 1924. For the next half century, the house was severely neglected with the house and other surviving structures filled with litter and the grounds overgrown.

=== Ronald and Lani Riches ===
After several changes of ownership, Ronald and Lani Riches of Los Angeles, California, purchased the property in 1978 and restored it to its original condition. The restoration of the house and original brick kitchen took three years. In 1982, after archaeological research determined the location of two small houses used as slave quarters, the buildings were reconstructed on the original sites. Though most of John Quitman's original furnishings had been lost, the house still contained a few pieces such as a sofa, a carved settee, and several chairs. The Riches searched for other furniture and memorabilia from Quitman, and they were able to recover his desk, two four-poster beds, and the Quitman family Bible. Other memorabilia now include the gold sword presented to Quitman by James K. Polk and the United States Congress for his services in the Mexican–American War, as well as the red handkerchief Quitman used to rally his troops.

== Monmouth Historic Inn & Gardens ==
Monmouth is now a small luxury hotel with a restaurant, lounge, gift shop, and 30 rooms and suites in the main house and outbuildings. Tours of the mansion are offered daily at 10 am and 2 pm.

== See also ==
- List of National Historic Landmarks in Mississippi
- National Register of Historic Places listings in Adams County, Mississippi
