= Confederate literature =

Regional genre

A Confederate novel was a type of fiction specific to North America that was written by Southerners. It centered around Confederate States of America nationalism and existed to rationalize and defend a slavery-based economy, as well as create a self-perpetuating cultural ethos. More broadly defined, Confederate literature included nationalistic poetry, songs, and certain memoirs. It was stylistically preceded by plantation fiction and anti-Tom novels. Much of Confederate fiction was published serially in magazines and newspapers. Confederate literature long outlasted the nominal Confederate nation-state. Confederate literature and Lost Cause mythology had a symbiotic relationship following the military defeat of the Confederate States of America, a synthesis that culminated in many senses with the 1905 novel The Clansman, which was adapted for film as The Birth of a Nation. Other influential Confederate novels include Richard Malcolm Johnston's Georgia Sketches (1864) and Augusta Jane Evans' Macaria; or, the Altars of Sacrifice (1864). John Hunt Morgan is lionized in most Confederate fiction of Kentucky. One 1898 example is a book called Camp Fires of the Confederacy: Confederate poems and selected songs dedicated to the "brave and intrepid host...[in] the long and gallant struggle of the South for political emancipation and autonomy."

== See also ==
- Pseudohistory
- Gone With the Wind
- Neo-Confederate
- Category:Lost Cause of the Confederacy
