= Maybelle Stephens Mitchell =

American suffragist (1872–1919)

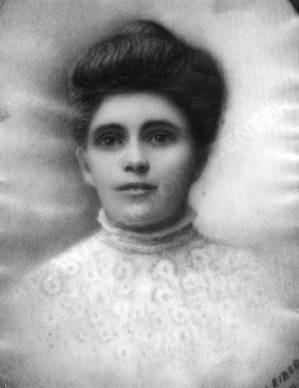
- 1890 Portrait of Mitchell by Freidenthall Lieber
- Born: Mary Isabel Stephens; January 13, 1872; Atlanta, Fulton County, Georgia, U.S.
- Died: January 25, 1919 (aged 47); Atlanta, Fulton County, Georgia, U.S.
- Resting place: Oakland Cemetery
- Education: Villa Maria Convent; Atlanta Female Seminary
- Occupations: suffragist, activist
- Spouse: Eugene Muse Mitchell (m.1893)
- Children: 3 (including Margaret Mitchell)
- Parent(s): John Stephens; Annie Fitzgerald
- Relatives: Joseph Mitchell (grandson); Mary Melanie Holliday (cousin)

Mary Isabel "Maybelle" Stephens Mitchell (January 13, 1872 – January 25, 1919) was an American suffragist, clubwoman, and activist. Born into a prestigious planting family of Irish Catholic background, she was educated at the Villa Maria Convent in Quebec and the Atlanta Female Seminary in Georgia. A social and political activist, Mitchell was a leader in the women's suffrage movement in Georgia, protesting against state laws and meeting with local politicians to advocate for the rights of women, and was a member of the Atlanta Woman's Club. In 1915, she served as the president of the Atlanta Women's Suffrage League and, later, co-founded the League of Women Voters in Georgia. Mitchell helped establish the Catholic Layman's Association of Georgia, fighting against anti-Catholicism in the United States. She was the mother of author and journalist Margaret Mitchell, whose character Ellen Robillard O'Hara from Gone With the Wind may have been based on Mitchell.

== Personal life and family ==
Mitchell was born Mary Isabel Stephens on January 13, 1872, at her parents' Jackson Street mansion in Atlanta. She was the seventh child of Captain John Stephens, a Confederate officer and merchant who served on the Atlanta Police Commission, and Annie Fitzgerald, a landowner. Her father had immigrated from Ireland as a young man. Her mother was the daughter of planter Philip Fitzgerald, an Irish Catholic emigrant who owned Rural Home, a plantation in Clayton County near Jonesboro.

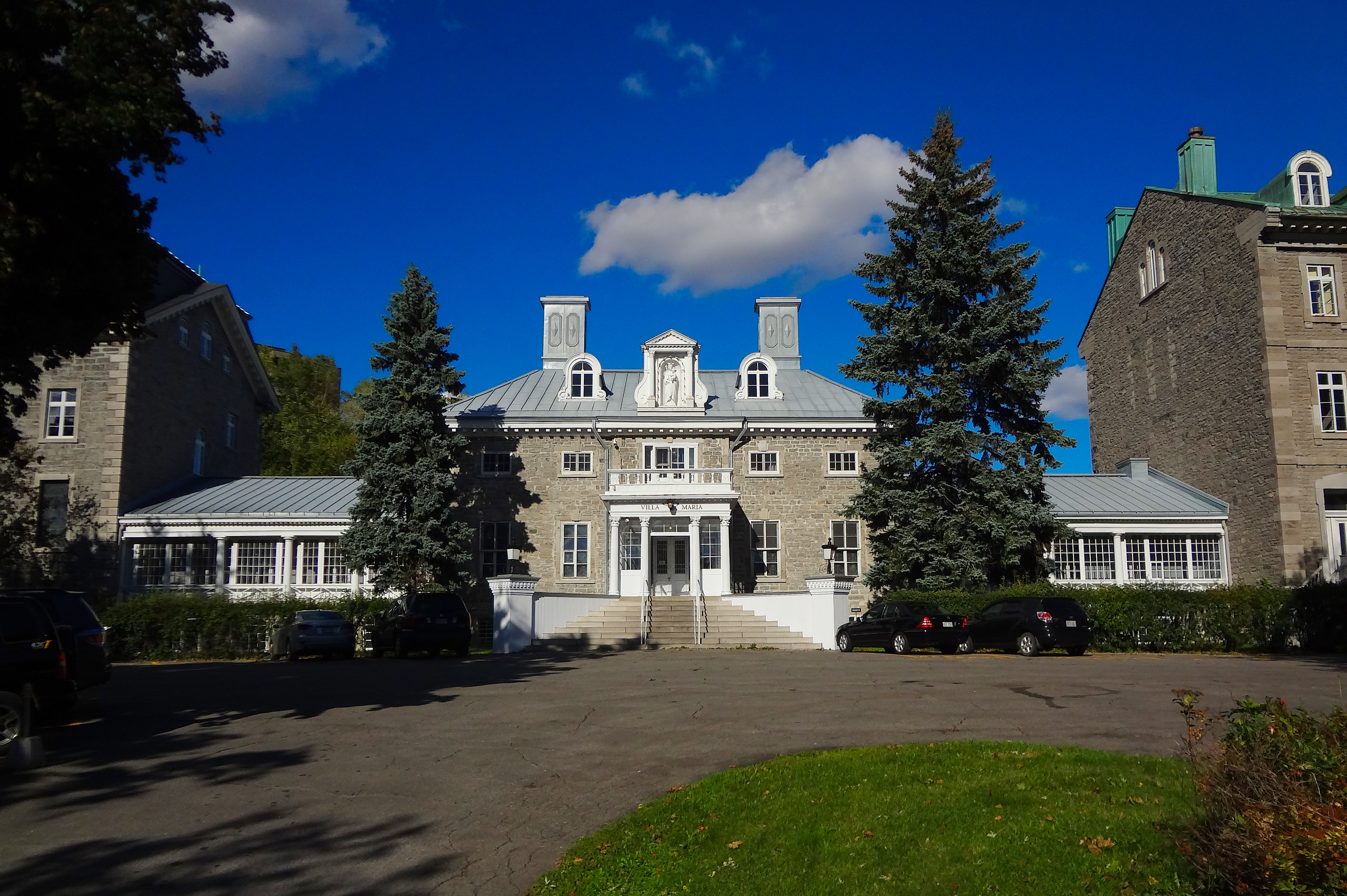
The Villa Maria Convent where Mitchell attended finishing school

Mitchell attended a finishing school at the Villa Maria Convent in Quebec, where she learned to speak French fluently, and graduated with honors from the Atlanta Female Seminary in 1892.

She married Eugene Muse Mitchell, an attorney and historian, in 1893. They had three children: Russell Mitchell, Stephens Mitchell, and Margaret Mitchell. Although her husband had Huguenot roots, she had all three of her children baptized in the Catholic Church. In the summertime she and her family would stay at the Fitzgerald family plantation in Clayton County with her aunts, Mary Ellen Fitzgerald and Sarah Fitzgerald. Her husband later served as the president of the board of education in Atlanta.

== Activism ==
Mitchell was very active and well-respected in Atlanta society. She was known for her progressive views, enthusiasm for politics, and morality. She was frequently written about in The Atlanta Journal-Constitution.

She championed women's suffrage in Georgia, helping establish the League of Women Voters in Georgia and serving as the president of the Atlanta Women's Suffrage League in 1915. She often protested against state laws that discriminated against women and met with local politicians to discuss women's rights.

She served as the president of the Women's Study Club and was an active member of the Catholic Church. Mitchell helped establish the Catholic Layman's Association of Georgia, which worked to explain Catholic beliefs and fight against anti-Catholicism in the United States. Mitchell was also an active member of the Atlanta Woman's Club, a philanthropic organization affiliated with the General Federation of Women's Clubs.

== Death ==
Mitchell contracted the Spanish flu and later developed pneumonia. She died on January 25, 1919. Her funeral was held at Sacred Heart Catholic Church, where she had been a parishioner. She is buried at Oakland Cemetery.
