= Annie Fitzgerald Stephens =

Grandmother of Margaret Mitchell

- Born: Annie Elizabeth Fitzgerald; December 23, 1844; Clayton County, Georgia, U.S.
- Died: February 17, 1934 (aged 89); Clayton County, Georgia, U.S.
- Resting place: Oakland Cemetery
- Education: Fayetteville Academy
- Occupations: businesswoman, landowner
- Spouse: John Stephens (m. 1863)
- Children: 12 (including Maybelle Stephens Mitchell)
- Relatives: Margaret Mitchell (granddaughter) Joseph Mitchell (great-grandson); Eugene Mitchell (son-in-law); Mary Melanie Holliday (cousin)

Annie Elizabeth Fitzgerald Stephens (December 23, 1844 – February 17, 1934) was an American landowner, businesswoman, and political activist. She was born to a prominent planting family in Clayton County, Georgia, and grew up on the family plantation Rural Home. The daughter of an Irish immigrant, she was a devout Catholic. Stephens was involved in real estate endeavors in Atlanta and sued the federal government after General William Tecumseh Sherman's Siege of Atlanta, during the American Civil War, damaged some of her properties. Some historians, literary critics, and film critics, including Molly Haskell, consider her to be the inspiration behind the fictional character Scarlett O'Hara, from Stephens' granddaughter Margaret Mitchell's novel, Gone with the Wind.

== Early life and family ==
Stephens was born Annie Elizabeth Fitzgerald in 1844. She was the daughter of Philip Fitzgerald, an Irish-Catholic emigrant from County Tipperary who left Ireland with his family after the Irish Rebellion of 1798, and his American wife, Eleanor Avaline McGhan. She was one of eight children. She was a granddaughter of James Fitzgerald and Margaret O'Donnell. Her father became a wealthy member of the planter class, owning a plantation of around 2,471 acres in Clayton County, Georgia, and enslaving 35 people. Stephens grew up on her family's plantation, which was named Rural Home, located near Jonesboro, Georgia. The plantation mansion was a two-story, wooden farm house. Her family was one of the first Catholic families in Georgia. Stephens was educated at the Fayetteville Academy.

== Civil War and Reconstruction Era ==
Stephens was politically active and strong-willed, pushing for legislation by assembling groups of women to petition elected officials. She was known to "speak her mind", particularly regarding moral issues that conflicted with her personal principles. Marianne Walker, the author of Margaret Mitchell and John Marsh: The Love Story Behind Gone With the Wind, describes Stephens as "mean", a "hellion from birth", and "contentious, aggressive, domineering, and outspoken." Walker also stated that Stephens' "energy, ego, and determination matched or even exceeded" those of the men in her life. She was obsessed with property and land, particularly her stake in her family's plantation, and purchased real estate in Atlanta. A landowner, she was known to ride around Jonesboro on a horse to collect rent from her tenants and once sued the U.S. Federal Government for damages incurred to her property during the Siege of Atlanta towards the end of the American Civil War.

During the war, she spent most of her time in Atlanta and stayed during General William Tecumseh Sherman's March to the Sea. Toward the end of the Siege of Atlanta, she returned to Rural Home. She allegedly demanded, and was granted, protection from the invading Union Army by General Sherman. The house was looted, but not destroyed by the army.

== Personal life ==
On April 14, 1863, she married Captain John Stephens, a Confederate States Army officer and member of an old Catholic gentry family from Birr, County Offaly, in a Catholic ceremony at the Shrine of the Immaculate Conception. Her husband became an established merchant in Atlanta and served on the Atlanta Police Commission for six terms. They had twelve children together.

Stephens was the maternal grandmother of author Margaret Mitchell, who spent summers with her on the family's plantation. It is believed that Mitchell based the character Scarlett O'Hara, from her novel Gone with the Wind, on Stephens. Feminist film critic Molly Haskell stated that Stephens was "the real-life progenitor of Scarlett."

Following her daughter Maybelle Stephens Mitchell's death, Stephens moved in with her son-in-law Eugene Mitchell and his children. After quarreling with Mitchell one night, Stephens called a cab and left the Mitchells' house, instead taking up residence at the Georgian Terrace Hotel. The move hurt the Mitchells financially, who were receiving an allowance from some of the Stephens relatives to help maintain Stephens' lifestyle while she lived with them. Stephens was estranged from polite society in Atlanta due to her shrewd business endeavors and behavior. She was a moralist and devout Catholic.

Stephens contested her father's will in order to claim a larger share of the family estate and won, dispossessing some of her other family members. She died on February 17, 1934, and is buried in Oakland Cemetery in Atlanta.
