= Gone with the Wind (novel) =

1936 novel by Margaret Mitchell

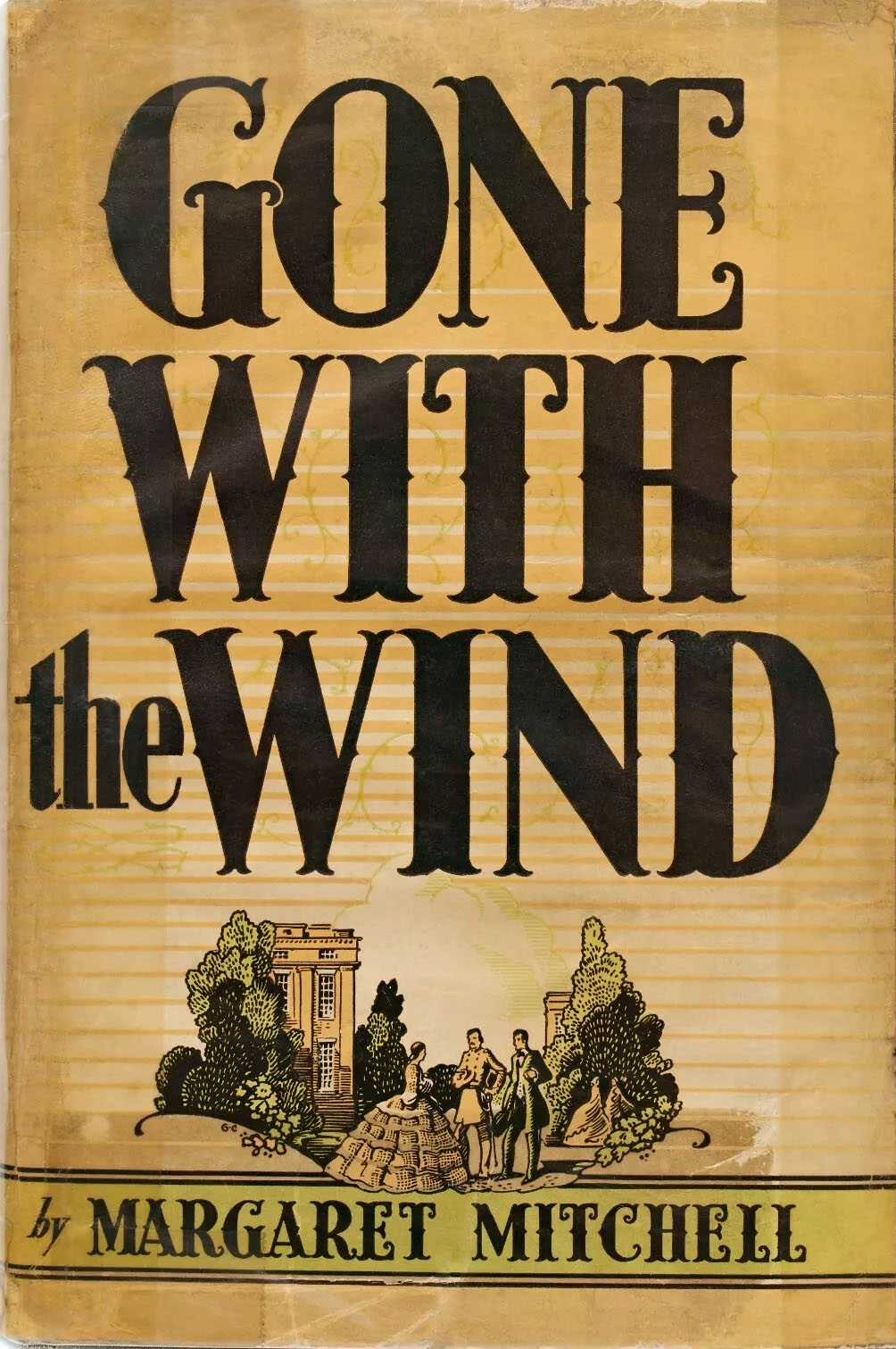
- First-edition cover
- Author: Margaret Mitchell
- Language: English
- Genre: Historical Fiction
- Publisher: Macmillan
- Publication date: June 30, 1936
- Publication place: United States
- Media type: Print (hard & paperback)
- Pages: 1,037 (first edition); 1,024 (Warner Books paperback)
- ISBN: 978-0-446-36538-3 (Warner)
- OCLC: 28491920
- Dewey Decimal: 813.52
- Followed by: Scarlett; Rhett Butler's People; Ruth's Journey

Gone with the Wind is a novel by American writer Margaret Mitchell, first published in 1936. The story is set in Clayton County and Atlanta, both in Georgia, during the American Civil War and Reconstruction era. It depicts the struggles of young Scarlett O'Hara, the spoiled oldest daughter of a well-to-do plantation owner, who must use every means at her disposal to claw her way out of poverty following Sherman's destructive "March to the Sea". This historical novel features a coming-of-age story, with the title taken from the poem Non Sum Qualis eram Bonae Sub Regno Cynarae by Ernest Dowson.

Gone with the Wind was popular with American readers from the outset and was the top American fiction bestseller in 1936 and 1937. As of 2014, a Harris poll found it to be the second favorite book of American readers, just behind the Bible. More than 30 million copies have been printed worldwide.

Gone with the Wind is a controversial reference point for subsequent writers of the South, both black and white. Scholars at American universities refer to, interpret, and study it in their writings. The novel has been absorbed into American popular culture.

Mitchell received the Pulitzer Prize for Fiction for the book in 1937. It was adapted into the 1939 film of the same name, which is considered to be one of the greatest films ever made and also received the Academy Award for Best Picture during the 12th annual Academy Awards ceremony. Gone with the Wind is the only novel by Mitchell published during her lifetime.

== Plot ==
=== Part I ===
It is April 15, 1861, the eve of a rebellion in which seven southern states declare their secession from the United States (known as "the Union") over a desire to continue the institution of slavery, which was the economic engine of the South. In one of those states, Georgia, the family of wealthy Irish immigrant Gerald O'Hara owns a plantation (called "Tara").

The oldest of the three O'Hara daughters, 16-year-old Scarlett is dismayed to learn that the man she secretly loves, her county neighbor Ashley Wilkes, is set to announce his engagement to his cousin Melanie Hamilton. The next day, the Wilkeses throw an all-day party at their estate (known as "Twelve Oaks") where Scarlett notices someone leering at her. He turns out to be Rhett Butler, who has a reputation for seducing young women. Throughout the day, Scarlett attempts to turn Ashley's head by flirting with every man present, including Melanie's brother Charles Hamilton. In the afternoon, Scarlett gets Ashley alone and confesses her love for him, convinced he will return it. However, he says only that he cares for her as a friend and intends to marry Melanie. Stung, Scarlett insults Ashley and accuses him of being too cowardly to submit to his real feelings for her. As Ashley departs, Rhett reveals he has overheard their whole exchange. Scarlett feels humiliated.

Later, war is declared, and the men are going to enlist. Feeling petty and vengeful, Scarlett accepts Charles's marriage proposal. They marry, and two weeks later, Charles goes to war, where he dies of measles two months later. Scarlett gives birth to his child, Wade Hampton Hamilton. As a widow, she is bound to dye her dresses black, wear a veil in public, and avoid conversations with young men. Scarlett secretly mourns the loss of her youth, not the husband she barely knew.

=== Part II ===
Scarlett's mother, mistaking Scarlett's depression for grief, suggests that living with Melanie might lift her spirits. Melanie is living in Atlanta with her Aunt Sarah Jane, who is called by her childhood nickname "Pittypat". After moving there, Scarlett's spirit is revived by the excitement of living in a growing city. She busies herself with hospital work and sewing circles for the Confederate Army. However, her heart is not in it – she does it primarily to avoid being gossiped about by the other women of Atlanta society. Additionally, she believes her efforts may aid Ashley, with whom she is still in love.

Scarlett is mortified when she runs into Rhett while staffing a sales stall at a public dance benefiting the troops. Rhett believes the war is a lost cause but is becoming rich as a blockade runner for profit. He sees through Scarlett's "lady in mourning" disguise and recognizes her longing to dance with the other young people, so he bids a lot of gold to win the honor of leading the first dance and chooses her as his partner. Scarlett scandalizes everyone by dancing joyfully while still dressed in widow's mourning. Her reputation is saved by Melanie, who is now her sister-in-law and highly respected in Atlanta; she argues that Scarlett is supporting the Confederate cause. Scarlett continues to act recklessly, flirting and dating while still in widow's clothes, always protected by Melanie's endorsement. She spends much of her time with Rhett, whose sexual attraction to Scarlett is ever-present. At one point, he enrages her with a silky proposition that she become his mistress. Still, she appreciates Rhett for his money, his sophistication, and their shared irritation with the hypocrisy of Atlanta society.

At Christmas (1863), Ashley is granted a furlough from the army and goes to Atlanta. Scarlett struggles to restrain her feelings for him. She remains convinced that he is secretly in love with her and is still married to Melanie out of duty. Scarlett is heartbroken when Melanie becomes pregnant with Ashley's child.

=== Part III ===
The war is going badly for the Confederacy. By September 1864, Atlanta is besieged from three sides. The city becomes desperate as hundreds of wounded Confederate soldiers pour in. Melanie goes into labor with only the inexperienced Scarlett and a young enslaved woman called Prissy to assist, as all the trained doctors are attending to the soldiers. The tattered Confederate States Army sets flame to Atlanta before they abandon it to the Union army. Amidst the chaos, Melanie gives birth to a boy, Beau.

Scarlett tracks down Rhett and begs him to take her, Wade, Melanie, Beau, and Prissy to Tara. Rhett laughs at this idea, explaining that the Yankees have likely burned Tara. Still, he steals an emaciated horse and a wagon and begins driving them out of Atlanta. At the city's edge, Rhett has a change of heart and abandons Scarlett to join the army in their final, doomed push. Scarlett drives the wagon to Tara, which has avoided being burned like many of her neighbors' homes. However, the situation is bleak: Scarlett's mother is dead, her father has lost his mind with grief, her sisters are sick with typhoid fever, the enslaved field workers have left, the Yankees have burned all the cotton, and there is no food.

A long struggle for survival begins, with Scarlett working in the fields. There are several hungry people and animals, along with an ever-present threat from Yankees who steal or burn what little they can find. At one point, Scarlett kills a Yankee soldier who attempts to invade her home and buries his body in the garden. A long post-war succession of Confederate soldiers returning home stop at Tara to find food and rest. Eventually, Ashley returns from the war with his idealistic view of the world shattered. Finding themselves alone one day, he and Scarlett share a kiss. Unable to trust himself with her nearby, Ashley says he will take his family and move away. Scarlett says she can not let them leave when they have nowhere to go and promises not to throw herself at him again.

=== Part IV ===
Life at Tara begins to recover, but exorbitant taxes are levied on the plantation. Scarlett knows only one man with enough money to help her – Rhett. She puts on her only pretty dress (made from the velvet curtains at Tara) and finds him in a jailhouse in Atlanta. He is being held on a murder charge and is likely to hang. Although she nearly wins him over with a southern belle routine, he declines to help after realizing her sweetness is an act meant to use his money. Leaving the jailhouse in a snit, Scarlett meets Frank Kennedy, a middle-aged storeowner betrothed to her sister, Suellen. Realizing that Frank also has money and that Suellen will turn her back on Tara once she is married, Scarlett hatches a plot to marry Frank. She lies to Frank that Suellen has changed her mind about marrying him. Dazed, Frank succumbs to Scarlett's charms and marries her two weeks later. Wanting to keep his wife happy, Frank gives Scarlett the money to pay the taxes.

While Frank has a cold and is pampered by Aunt Pittypat, Scarlett reviews the accounts at Frank's store and finds that many owe him money. Terrified of the possibility of more taxes and irritated with Frank's poor business sense, she takes control of the store; her business practices emasculate Frank and leave many Atlantans resentful of her. With a loan from Rhett, she also buys and runs a small sawmill, which is viewed as even more scandalous conduct. To Frank's relief and Scarlett's dismay, she gets pregnant, which temporarily curtails her business activities. She convinces Ashley to come to Atlanta and manage her mill while still in love with him. At Melanie's urging, Ashley reluctantly accepts. Melanie becomes the center of Atlanta society, and Scarlett gives birth to baby Ella Lorena.

Georgia is under martial law, and life has become more frightening. For protection, Scarlett keeps Frank's pistol tucked in the upholstery of his buggy. Her lone trips to and from the mill take her past a shanty town where criminals live. While on her way home one evening, she is accosted by two men who try to rob her. However, she escapes with the help of Big Sam, a black former foreman from Tara. Attempting to avenge his wife, Frank and the Ku Klux Klan raid the shanty town, where Frank is shot dead in the fracas. Rhett puts on a charade to keep the raiders from being arrested. He enters the Wilkeses' home with Hugh Elsing and Ashley, singing and pretending to be drunk. Yankee officers outside question Rhett, who says he and the other men had been at Belle Watling's brothel that evening, a story Belle later confirms to the officers. The men are indebted to Rhett, and his reputation among them improves. Meanwhile, the men's wives – except Melanie – are livid at owing their husbands' lives to the town madam. At Frank's funeral, Rhett asks Scarlett to marry him. She refuses at first, but after a bit of repartee, he kisses her passionately, and in the heat of the moment, she accepts. One year later, Scarlett and Rhett announce their engagement, which becomes the talk of the town.

=== Part V ===
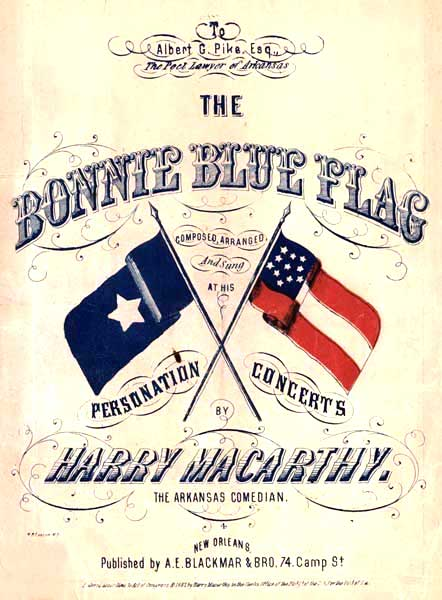
The Bonnie Blue Flag is an 1861 marching song that refers to the first unofficial flag of the Confederacy.

Mr. and Mrs. Butler honeymoon in New Orleans, spending lavishly. Returning to Atlanta, they build a gaudy mansion on Peachtree Street. Rhett happily pays for the house to be built to Scarlett's specifications but describes it as an "architectural horror". Shortly after moving into the house, the sardonic jabs between them become quarrels. Scarlett wonders why Rhett married her and then, "with real hate in her eyes", tells Rhett she will have a baby, which she does not want. Wade is seven years old in 1869 when his half-sister Eugenie Victoria is born. She has blue eyes, and Melanie nicknames her "Bonnie Blue" in reference to the Bonnie Blue flag of the Confederacy. After feeling well again, Scarlett makes a trip to the mill and talks to Ashley. In their conversation, she comes away believing Ashley still loves her and is jealous of Rhett. She returns home and tells Rhett she does not want more children. From then on, they sleep separately, and when Bonnie is two years old, she sleeps in a little bed beside Rhett. Rhett turns his attention entirely toward Bonnie, pampering her and working to ensure her a good reputation when she enters society.

Meanwhile, Melanie plans a surprise birthday party for Ashley. Scarlett goes to the mill to stall him until the celebration – a rare opportunity to be alone together. The two reminisce about the old days and how far their lives have departed from what they imagined for themselves. They share an innocent embrace but are spotted in the moment by Ashley's sister, India. Before the party has even begun, a rumor of an affair between Ashley and Scarlett explodes across Atlanta, eventually reaching Rhett and Melanie. Melanie refuses to accept any criticism of Scarlett, and India is expelled from the Wilkes home. That night at home, Rhett, drunker than Scarlett has ever seen him and acting more violent than ever, encourages Scarlett to drink with him. However, she declines with deliberate rudeness. Rhett pins her to the wall and tells her they could have been happy together if she could have let go of Ashley. He then takes her in his arms and carries her to her bedroom, where they engage in intercourse. Several days later, a chagrined Rhett leaves town with Bonnie and Prissy for three months. Scarlett is uncertain about her feelings surrounding Rhett, for whom she feels a mixture of desire and revulsion. She then learns she is pregnant with her fourth child.

When Rhett returns, he comments on Scarlett's paleness, and she reveals her pregnancy. Rhett sarcastically asks if the father is Ashley; Scarlett calls him a cad and says that no woman would want his baby, to which he replies, "Cheer up, maybe you'll have a miscarriage." She lunges at him but misses and tumbles down the stairs. She is seriously ill for the first time in her life, having lost the baby and broken her ribs. Rhett is remorseful and fears Scarlett will die. Sobbing and drunk, he seeks consolation from Melanie and confesses he acted out of jealousy. Scarlett goes to Tara with Wade and Ella to regain her strength and vitality. She returns healthy to Atlanta and sells the mills to Ashley. Bonnie is four years old in 1873, and Atlanta society is charmed by Rhett's transformation into a doting father. Rhett buys Bonnie a Shetland pony, teaching her to ride sidesaddle and paying a trainer to teach the pony to jump. One day, Bonnie makes her father raise the bar to one-and-a-half feet. During the jump, she falls and dies of a broken neck.

In the months following Bonnie's death, Rhett is often drunk and disheveled, while Scarlett, though equally bereaved, is more presentable. Melanie conceives a second child but loses the baby and soon dies due to complications. As she comforts the widowed Ashley, Scarlett realizes she stopped loving him long ago and perhaps never did. She is shocked to realize that she has always loved Rhett, and he has loved her in return. She returns home, brimming with her new love and determined to begin anew with him. She discovers him sitting in the library. In the wake of Melanie's death, Rhett has decided he wants to rediscover the calm Southern dignity he once knew in his youth and is leaving Atlanta to find it. Scarlett tries to persuade Rhett to either stay or take her with him, but he explains that while he once loved Scarlett, the years of hurt and neglect have killed that love. He says he may "come back often enough to keep gossip down" (since they have decided not to get a divorce), but in reply to Scarlett's plea of "What shall I do?" he replies, "My dear, I don't give a damn", and walks upstairs. Amid her grief, Scarlett consoles herself with the knowledge that she still has Tara. She plans to return there with the certainty that she can recover and win Rhett back because "tomorrow is another day".

== Characters ==
=== Main characters ===
- Katie Scarlett Hamilton Kennedy Butler née O'Hara: Scarlett is the oldest O'Hara daughter. Her forthright Irish blood is always at variance with the French teachings of style from her mother. Scarlett marries Charles Hamilton, Frank Kennedy, and Rhett Butler, in that order, always wishing that she was married to Ashley Wilkes instead. She is secretly scornful of Melanie Wilkes, wife to Ashley, who has always shown her love. She has three children, one from each husband: Wade Hampton Hamilton (son to Charles Hamilton), Ella Lorena Kennedy (daughter to Frank Kennedy), and Eugenie Victoria "Bonnie Blue" Butler (daughter to Rhett Butler). During a quarrel with Rhett, she miscarries a fourth child (and her second with Rhett) when she accidentally falls down the stairs. Scarlett is unaware of the extent of Rhett's love for her or that she might love him.
- Captain Rhett K. Butler: Scarlett's admirer and her third husband. He is often publicly shunned for his scandalous behavior and sometimes accepted for his charm. Rhett declares he is not a marrying man and initially propositions Scarlett to be his mistress, but marries her after the death of Frank Kennedy. He says he won't risk losing her to someone else since it is unlikely she will ever need money again. At the end of the novel, Rhett confesses to Scarlett, "I loved you but I couldn't let you know it. You're so brutal to those who love you, Scarlett." Mitchell took the character's name from the prominent Rhett family of South Carolina.
- Major George Ashley Wilkes: Ashley is a noble and honorable man. He is well read and cultured. He marries his cousin, Melanie, because "Like must marry like or there'll be no happiness." He enlists in the Confederate States Army though he says he would have freed the people his father enslaved after his father's death if the war had not done it first. Although many of his friends and relations are killed in the Civil War, Ashley survives to see its brutal aftermath. Ashley is "the Perfect Knight", in the mind of Scarlett, even throughout her three marriages. "She loved him and wanted him and did not understand him."
- Melanie Wilkes née Hamilton: Ashley's wife and cousin. Melanie is a humble, serene, and gracious Southern woman. Her extremely warm heart and tenderness towards all she loves is notable throughout her life. As the story unfolds, Melanie becomes progressively physically weaker, first by childbirth, then "the hard work she had done at Tara", and she dies after a miscarriage. As Rhett Butler says, "She never had any strength. She's never had anything but heart."

=== Secondary characters ===
==== Scarlett's immediate family ====
- Ellen O'Hara née Robillard: is Scarlett's mother. Of French ancestry, Ellen married Gerald O'Hara, who was 28 years her senior, after her true love, Philippe Robillard, died in a bar fight. She is Scarlett's ideal of a "great lady". Ellen ran all aspects of the household and nursed enslaved people and poor whites. She dies from typhoid in August 1864 after nursing Emmie Slattery.
- Gerald O'Hara: is Scarlett's Irish father. An excellent horseman, Gerald likes to jump fences on horseback while intoxicated, which eventually leads to his death. Gerald's mind becomes addled after the death of his wife, Ellen.
- Susan Elinor "Suellen" Benteen née O'Hara: is Scarlett's younger sister, born in 1846, whom Scarlett mostly despised due to her opinion of Suellen being "an annoying sister with her whining and selfishness". She became sickened by typhoid during the siege of Atlanta. After the war, Scarlett steals and marries Suellen's beau, Frank Kennedy. Later, Suellen marries Will Benteen, and they have a child, Susie.
- Caroline Irene "Carreen" O'Hara: is Scarlett's youngest sister, born in 1848. She was also ill with typhoid during the siege of Atlanta. She is infatuated with and later engaged to Brent Tarleton, who dies in the war. Broken-hearted by Brent's death, Carreen eventually joins a convent.
- Gerald O'Hara Junior: are the three sons of Ellen and Gerald who died in infancy and are buried 100 yards from the house. Each was named after the father; they were born and died in quick succession. The headstone of each boy is inscribed "Gerald O'Hara, Jr."
- Charles Hamilton: is Melanie Wilkes' brother and Scarlett's first husband. Charles is a shy and loving man. Father to Wade Hampton, Charles dies of pneumonia caused by measles before reaching a battlefield or seeing his son.
- Wade Hampton Hamilton: is the son of Scarlett and Charles, born in early 1862. He was named for his father's commanding officer, Wade Hampton III, as was the fashion for Southern boys at the time. Traumatized by the invasion and burning of Atlanta, he is a shy and fearful child, much to the annoyance of Scarlett, who frequently orders him to "be a little man." He hopes to attend Harvard University and become a lawyer like his father, although Scarlett strongly objects to him attending a "Yankee school," preferring the University of Georgia. He is fond of his pet St. Bernard dog and his aunt Melanie. He mostly plays with his cousin Beau, since the families of other boys his age in Atlanta won't receive him on account of Scarlett's reputation.
- Frank Kennedy: is Suellen O'Hara's former fiancé and Scarlett's second husband. Frank is an unattractive older man who runs a successful general store after the war. He originally proposes to Suellen, but instead, Scarlett marries him for his money to pay the taxes on Tara. Frank is unable to comprehend Scarlett's fears and her desperate struggle for survival after the war. He is unwilling to be as ruthless in business as Scarlett is. Unknown to Scarlett, Frank is involved in the Ku Klux Klan. He is "shot through the head", according to Rhett Butler, while attempting to defend Scarlett's honor after she is attacked.
- Ella Lorena Kennedy: is the daughter of Scarlett and Frank, named for her grandmother, Ellen, and given "the most fashionable name" for Southern girls at the time as a middle name. She is considered stupid and ugly by most, with the exception of Frank. She is afraid of all animals, very unlike both of her half-siblings. She does not get along well with Wade, who considers her slow, and has a childish enmity with her cousin Susie.
- Eugenie Victoria "Bonnie Blue" Butler: is Scarlett and Rhett's pretty and spoiled daughter, as Irish in looks and temper as Gerald O'Hara, with the same blue eyes. Originally named for the queens of France and England at the time, she becomes known solely by her nickname after Melanie remarks that her eyes are "as blue as the Bonnie Blue Flag." Rhett adores Bonnie, giving her all the love and attention that Scarlett refuses to accept, and becomes determined to ensure a proper place for her in Southern society. He stops drinking because she dislikes the smell of liquor and comforts her when she cries in fear of the dark. Scarlett decides that Bonnie is her favorite child because she is bolder than Wade and prettier and more clever than Ella. Bonnie later dies of a broken neck after attempting to jump a high fence on her pony. Her death prompts Rhett to leave Scarlett at the end of the story.

==== Tara ====
I made Tara up, just as I made up every character in the book. But nobody will believe me.

— Margaret Mitchell
- Mammy: is Scarlett's nurse. Scarlett's grandmother enslaved her; she raises Ellen O'Hara and later her daughters and grandchildren. Mammy is "head woman of the plantation" and takes her work and the good name of the O'Haras extremely seriously. She is very outspoken and quick to chastise the girls for improper behavior.
- Pork: is Gerald O'Hara's valet and the first person he enslaved. Gerald won the enslavement of Pork in a poker game (as he did ownership of the Tara plantation in a separate poker game). When Gerald died, Scarlett gave his pocket watch to Pork. She offered to have the watch engraved, but Pork declined the offer.
- Dilcey: is Pork's wife and an enslaved woman of mixed Native American and African descent. Scarlett encourages her father to buy Dilcey and her daughter from John Wilkes, the latter as a favor to Dilcey that she never forgets.
- Prissy: is Dilcey's daughter. Prissy is Wade's nurse and goes with Scarlett to Atlanta.
- Jonas Wilkerson: is the Yankee overseer of Tara before the Civil War. He impregnates Emmie Slattery out of wedlock, which prompts Ellen to insist on his dismissal. He later marries Emmie and becomes a carpetbagger, making an attempt to buy Tara from Scarlett, who flatly refuses.
- Big Sam: is a strong, hardworking, enslaved field worker and the foreman at Tara. In post-war lawlessness, Sam rescues Scarlett from would-be thieves.
- Will Benteen: is a "South Georgia cracker", Confederate soldier, and patient listener to the troubles of all. Will lost part of his leg in the war and walks with the aid of a wooden stump. The O'Haras take him in on his journey home from the war; he manages the farm after his recovery. Fond of Carreen O'Hara, he is disappointed when she decides to enter a convent. He later marries Suellen and has at least one child, Susie, with her.

==== Clayton County ====
- India Wilkes: is the sister of Honey and Ashley Wilkes. She is described as plain. Stuart Tarleton courted India before he and his brother Brent both fell in love with Scarlett. India despises Scarlett and spreads rumors about her and Ashley, which Melanie refuses to believe.
- Honey née Wilkes (married last name unknown): is the sister of India and Ashley Wilkes. Honey is described as having the "odd lashless look of a rabbit".
- John Wilkes: is the owner of the Twelve Oaks plantation and patriarch of the Wilkes family. John Wilkes is educated and gracious. He dies during the siege of Atlanta.
- Tarleton boys: Boyd, Tom, and the twins, Brent and Stuart: The red-headed Tarleton boys were in frequent scrapes, loved practical jokes and gossip, and "were worse than the plagues of Egypt", according to their mother. The inseparable twins, Brent and Stuart, at 19 years old, were six feet two inches tall. All four boys were killed in the war, the twins just moments apart at the Battle of Gettysburg. Boyd was buried somewhere in Virginia.
- Tarleton girls: Hetty, Camilla, Randa, and Betsy: The "pretty, buxom" Tarleton girls have varying shades of red hair: plain red for Hetty, strawberry blond for Camilla, auburn for Randa, and carrot-red for Betsy. The fun-loving daughters treat Beatrice more as a friend than a parent, which Scarlett finds both shocking and endearing.
- Beatrice Tarleton: is the mistress of the Fairhill plantation. She manages a large cotton plantation, a hundred negroes, eight children, and the largest horse-breeding farm in Georgia. Hot-tempered, she believed that "a lick every now and then did her boys no harm."
- Calvert family: Raiford, Cade, and Cathleen: are the O'Haras' Clayton County neighbors from another plantation, Pine Bloom. Cathleen Calvert was Scarlett's friend. Their widowed father Hugh married a Yankee governess. Raiford is killed at Gettysburg. Next to Scarlett, Cathleen "had had more beaux than any girl in the County", but eventually married their former Yankee overseer, Mr. Hilton.
- Fontaine family: Joe, Tony, and Alex are known for their hot tempers. Joe is killed at Gettysburg, while Tony murders Jonas Wilkerson in a barroom and flees to Texas, leaving Alex to tend to their plantation. Grandma Fontaine, also known as "Old Miss", is the wife of old Doc Fontaine, the boys' grandfather. "Young Miss" and young Dr. Fontaine, the boys' parents, and Sally Fontaine née Munroe, wife to Joe, make up the remaining family of the Mimosa plantation.
- Emmie Wilkerson née Slattery: is a poor white woman. The daughter of Tom Slattery, her family lived on three acres along the swamp bottoms between the O'Hara and Wilkes plantations. Emmie gave birth to a stillborn illegitimate child fathered by Jonas Wilkerson, a Yankee and the overseer at Tara, with Ellen O'Hara attending as midwife during Emmie's labor and delivery. Emmie later married Jonas. After the war, flush with carpetbagger cash, they try to buy Tara, but Scarlett refuses the offer.

==== Atlanta ====
- Sarah Jane "Pittypat" Hamilton: acquired the nickname "Pittypat" in childhood because she walked on tiny feet. Aunt "Pittypat" is an easily flustered spinster who lives in the red-brick house at the quiet end of Peachtree Street in Atlanta. The house is half-owned by Scarlett (after the death of Charles Hamilton). Her finances are managed by her brother, Henry, whom she doesn't especially care for. Aunt Pittypat raised Melanie and Charles Hamilton after the death of their father, with considerable help from "Uncle" Peter, who she enslaves.
- Henry Hamilton: is Aunt Pittypat's brother, an attorney, and the uncle of Charles and Melanie.
- "Uncle" Peter: is an older enslaved man who works as Aunt Pittypat's coach driver and general factotum. Uncle Peter looked after Melanie and Charles Hamilton when they were young.
- Beauregard "Beau" Wilkes: is Melanie and Ashley's son, who is born in Atlanta when the siege begins and transported to Tara after birth. Like his cousin and playmate Wade, he is named for his father's commanding general, in this case P.G.T. Beauregard. When Ashley proposes moving North to find work, Melanie objects on the ground that they would have to send Beau to an integrated school. He was suggested as a future husband for Bonnie before her death.
- Archie: is an ex-convict and former Confederate soldier who was imprisoned for the murder of his adulterous wife (who was having an affair with his brother) before the war. Melanie takes in Archie, who becomes Scarlett's coach driver.
- Meade family: Atlanta society considers Dr. Meade to be "the root of all strength and all wisdom". He looks after injured soldiers during the siege with assistance from Melanie and Scarlett. Mrs. Meade is on the bandage-rolling committee. Their two sons are killed in the war.
- Merriwether family: Mrs. Dolly Merriwether is an Atlanta dowager along with Mrs. Elsing and Mrs. Whiting. Post-war, she sells homemade pies to survive, eventually opening a bakery. Her father-in-law Grandpa Merriwether fights in the Home Guard and survives the war. Her daughter Maybelle marries René Picard, a Louisiana Zouave. They have two sons, Napoleon and Raoul.
- Belle Watling: is a prostitute and brothel madam who is portrayed as a loyal Confederate. Melanie declares she will acknowledge Belle when she passes her in the street, but Belle tells her not to.

==== Robillard family ====
- Pierre Robillard: is the father of Ellen O'Hara. Even though his family was Roman Catholic, he was staunchly Presbyterian. The thought of his daughter becoming a nun was worse than her marrying Gerald O'Hara.
- Solange Robillard née Prudhomme: is the mother of Ellen O'Hara and Scarlett's grandmother. She was a dainty Frenchwoman who was haughty and cold.
- Eulalie and Pauline Robillard: are the married sisters of Ellen O'Hara who live in Charleston.
- Philippe Robillard: is the cousin of Ellen O'Hara and her first love. Philippe died in a bar fight in New Orleans around 1844.

== Biographical background and publication ==
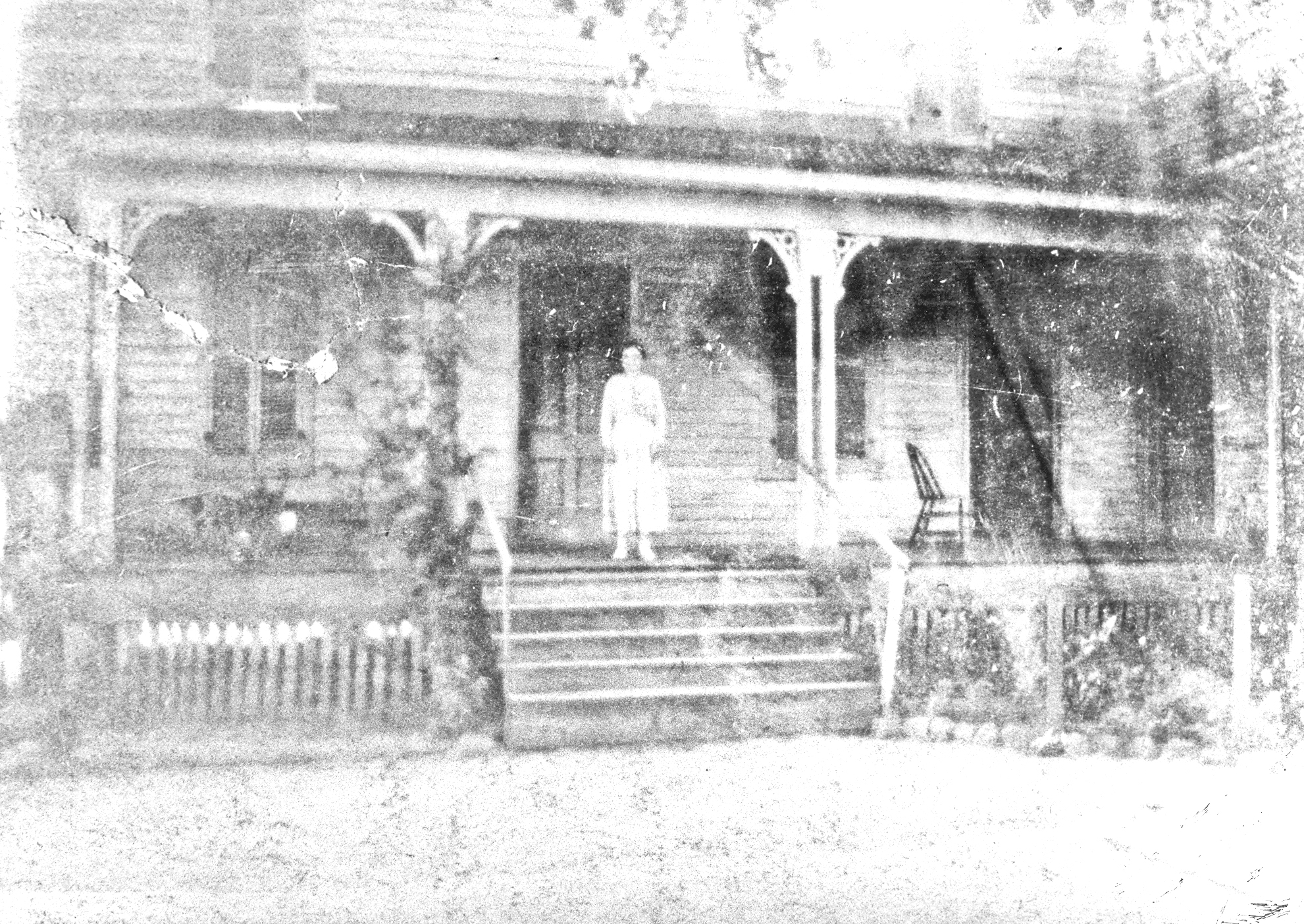
Rural Home, the plantation home of Mitchell's grandmother Annie Fitzgerald Stephens

Born in 1900 in Atlanta, Margaret (Peggy) Mitchell was a Southerner and writer throughout her life. She grew up hearing stories about the American Civil War and the Reconstruction from her Irish-American grandmother, Annie Fitzgerald Stephens, who had endured its suffering while living on the family plantation, Rural Home. Her forceful and intellectual mother, Maybelle Stephens Mitchell, was a suffragist who fought for the rights of women to vote.

As a young woman, Mitchell found love with an army lieutenant. He was killed in World War I, and she would carry his memory for the remainder of her life. After studying at Smith College for a year, during which time her mother died from the 1918 pandemic flu, Mitchell returned to Atlanta. She married, but her husband was an abusive bootlegger. She took a job writing feature articles for the Atlanta Journal at a time when Atlanta debutantes of her class did not work. After divorcing her first husband, she married again to a man who shared her interest in writing and literature, John Marsh. He had been the best man at her first wedding.

Margaret Mitchell began writing Gone with the Wind in 1926 to pass the time while recovering from a slow-healing injury from an auto crash. In April 1935, Harold Latham of Macmillan, an editor looking for new fiction, read her manuscript and saw that it could be a best-seller. After Latham agreed to publish the book, Mitchell worked for another six months checking the historical references and rewriting the opening chapter several times. Mitchell and her husband, John Marsh, a copy editor by trade, edited the final version of the novel. Mitchell wrote the book's final moments first and then wrote the events that led to them. Gone with the Wind was published in June 1936.

== Title ==
The author tentatively titled the novel Tomorrow Is Another Day, from its last line. Other proposed titles included Bugles Sang True, Not in Our Stars, and Tote the Weary Load. The title Mitchell finally chose is from the first line of the third stanza of the poem "Non Sum Qualis Eram Bonae sub Regno Cynarae" by Ernest Dowson:

I have forgot much, Cynara! gone with the wind,
Flung roses, roses riotously with the throng,
Dancing, to put thy pale, lost lilies out of mind ...

Scarlett O'Hara uses the title phrase when she wonders if her home on a plantation called "Tara" is still standing or if it had "gone with the wind which had swept through Georgia". In a general sense, the title is a metaphor for the demise of a way of life in the South before the Civil War. When taken in the context of Dowson's poem about "Cynara", the phrase "gone with the wind" alludes to erotic loss. The poem expresses the regrets of someone who has lost his feelings for his "old passion", Cynara. Dowson's Cynara, a name that comes from the Greek word for artichoke, represents a lost love.

It is also possible that the author was influenced by the connection of the phrase "Gone with the wind" with Tara in a line of James Joyce's Ulysses in the chapter "Aeolus".

== Structure ==
=== Coming-of-age story ===
Margaret Mitchell arranged Gone with the Wind chronologically, focusing on the life and experiences of the main character, Scarlett O'Hara, as she grew from adolescence into adulthood. During the novel's period, from 1861 to 1873, Scarlett ages from sixteen to twenty-eight. This is a type of Bildungsroman, a novel concerned with the moral and psychological growth of the protagonist from youth to adulthood (coming-of-age story). Scarlett's development is affected by the events of her time. Mitchell used a smooth linear narrative structure. The novel is known for its exceptional "readability". The plot is rich with vivid characters.

=== Genre ===
Gone with the Wind is often placed in the literary subgenre of the historical romance novel. Pamela Regis has argued that it is more appropriately classified as a historical novel, as it does not contain all of the elements of the romance genre. The novel has been described as an early classic of the erotic historical genre because it is thought to contain some degree of pornography.

== Plot elements ==
=== Slavery ===
Slavery in Gone with the Wind is a backdrop to a story that is essentially about other things. Southern plantation fiction (also known as Anti-Tom literature, in reference to reactions to Harriet Beecher Stowe's anti-slavery novel, Uncle Tom's Cabin of 1852) from the mid-19th century, culminating in Gone with the Wind, is written from the perspective and values of a slave owner and tends to present slaves as docile and happy.

==== Caste system ====
The characters in the novel are organized into two basic groups along class lines: the white planter class, such as Scarlett and Ashley, and the black house servant class. The enslaved people depicted in Gone with the Wind are primarily loyal house servants, such as Mammy, Pork, Prissy, and Uncle Peter. House servants are the highest "caste" of enslaved people in Mitchell's caste system. They choose to stay with their masters after the Emancipation Proclamation of 1863 and subsequent Thirteenth Amendment of 1865 sets them free. Scarlett thinks of the servants who stayed at Tara, "There were qualities of loyalty and tirelessness and love in them that no strain could break, no money could buy."

The enslaved field workers make up the lower class in Mitchell's caste system. The enslaved field workers from the Tara plantation and the foreman, Big Sam, are taken away by Confederate soldiers to dig ditches and never return to the plantation. Mitchell wrote that other enslaved field workers were "loyal" and "refused to avail themselves of the new freedom", but the novel has no enslaved field workers who stay on the plantation to work after emancipation.

American William Wells Brown escaped from slavery and published his memoir, or slave narrative, in 1847. He wrote of the disparity in conditions between the house servant and the field hand:

During the time that Mr. Cook was overseer, I was a house servant – a situation preferable to a field hand, as I was better fed, better clothed, and not obliged to rise at the ringing bell, but about a half-hour after. I have often laid and heard the crack of the whip, and the screams of the slave.

==== Faithful and devoted slave ====
Way back in the dark days of the Early Sixties, regrettable tho it was – men fought, bled, and died for the freedom of the negro – her freedom! – and she stood by and did her duty to the last ditch –

It was and is her life to serve, and she has done it well.

While shot and shell thundered to release the shackles of slavery from her body and her soul – she loved, fought for, and protected – Us who held her in bondage, her "Marster" and her "Missus!"

— Excerpt from My Old Black Mammy by James W. Elliott, 1914.

Although the novel is more than 1,000 pages long, the character of Mammy never considers what her life might be like away from Tara. She recognizes her freedom to come and go as she pleases, saying, "Ah is free, Miss Scarlett. You kain sen' me nowhar Ah doan wanter go", but Mammy remains duty-bound to "Miss Ellen's chile". (No other name for Mammy is given in the novel.)

Eighteen years before the publication of Gone with the Wind, an article titled "The Old Black Mammy", written in the Confederate Veteran in 1918, discussed the romanticized view of the mammy character persisting in Southern literature:

for her faithfulness and devotion, she has been immortalized in the literature of the South; so the memory of her will never pass, but live on in the tales that are told of those "dear dead days beyond recall".

Micki McElya, in her book Clinging to Mammy, suggests the myth of the faithful enslaved person, in the figure of Mammy, lingered because white Americans wished to live in a world in which African Americans were not angry over the injustice of slavery.

The best-selling anti-slavery novel, Uncle Tom's Cabin by Harriet Beecher Stowe, published in 1852, is mentioned briefly in Gone with the Wind as being accepted by the Yankees as "revelation second only to the Bible". The enduring interest of both Uncle Tom's Cabin and Gone with the Wind has resulted in lingering stereotypes of 19th-century enslaved Black people. Gone with the Wind has become a reference point for subsequent writers about the South, both black and white alike.

=== Southern belle ===
Young misses whut frowns an' pushes out dey chins an' says 'Ah will' an' 'Ah woan' mos' gener'ly doan ketch husbands.

— Mammy

The southern belle is an archetype for a young woman of the antebellum American South upper class. The southern belle was considered physically attractive but, more importantly, personally charming with sophisticated social skills. She is subject to the correct code of female behavior. The novel's heroine, Scarlett O'Hara, charming though not beautiful, is a classic southern belle.

For young Scarlett, her mother, Ellen O'Hara, represents the ideal southern belle. In "A Study in Scarlett", published in The New Yorker, Claudia Roth Pierpont wrote:

The Southern belle was bred to conform to a subspecies of the nineteenth-century "lady" ... For Scarlett, the ideal is embodied in her adored mother, the saintly Ellen, whose back is never seen to rest against the back of any chair on which she sits, whose broken spirit everywhere is mistaken for righteous calm

However, Scarlett is not always willing to conform. Kathryn Lee Seidel, in her book, The Southern Belle in the American Novel, wrote:

part of her does try to rebel against the restraints of a code of behavior that relentlessly attempts to mold her into a form to which she is not naturally suited.

Scarlett, the figure of a pampered southern belle, lives through an extreme reversal of fortune and wealth and survives to rebuild Tara and her self-esteem. Her bad belle traits (Scarlett's deceitfulness, shrewdness, manipulation, and superficiality), in contrast to Melanie's good belle traits (trust, self-sacrifice, and loyalty), enable her to survive in the post-war South and pursue her main interest, which is to make enough money to survive and prosper. Although Scarlett was "born" around 1845, she is portrayed to appeal to modern-day readers for her passionate and independent spirit, determination, and obstinate refusal to feel defeated.

==== Historical background ====
Marriage was supposed to be the goal of all southern belles, as that of their husbands largely determined women's status. All social and educational pursuits were directed towards it. Despite the Civil War and the loss of a generation of eligible men, young ladies were still expected to marry. By law and Southern social convention, household heads were adult, white propertied males, and all white women and all African Americans were thought to require protection and guidance because they lacked the capacity for reason and self-control.

The Atlanta Historical Society has produced many Gone with the Wind exhibits, among them a 1994 exhibit titled "Disputed Territories: Gone with the Wind and Southern Myths". The exhibit asked, "Was Scarlett a Lady?", finding that historically most women of the period were not involved in business activities as Scarlett was during Reconstruction when she ran a sawmill. White women performed traditional jobs such as teaching and sewing and generally disliked work outside the home.

During the Civil War, Southern women played a significant role as volunteer nurses in makeshift hospitals. Many were middle- and upper-class women who had never worked for wages or seen the inside of a hospital. One such nurse was Ada W. Bacot, a young widow who had lost two children. Bacot came from a wealthy South Carolina plantation family that enslaved 87 people.

In the fall of 1862, Confederate laws were changed to permit women to be employed in hospitals as members of the Confederate Medical Department. Twenty-seven-year-old nurse Kate Cumming from Mobile, Alabama, described the primitive hospital conditions in her journal:

They are in the hall, on the gallery, and crowded into very small rooms. The foul air from this mass of human beings at first made me giddy and sick, but I soon got over it. We have to walk, and when we give the men any thing kneel, in blood and water; but we think nothing of it at all.

=== Battles ===
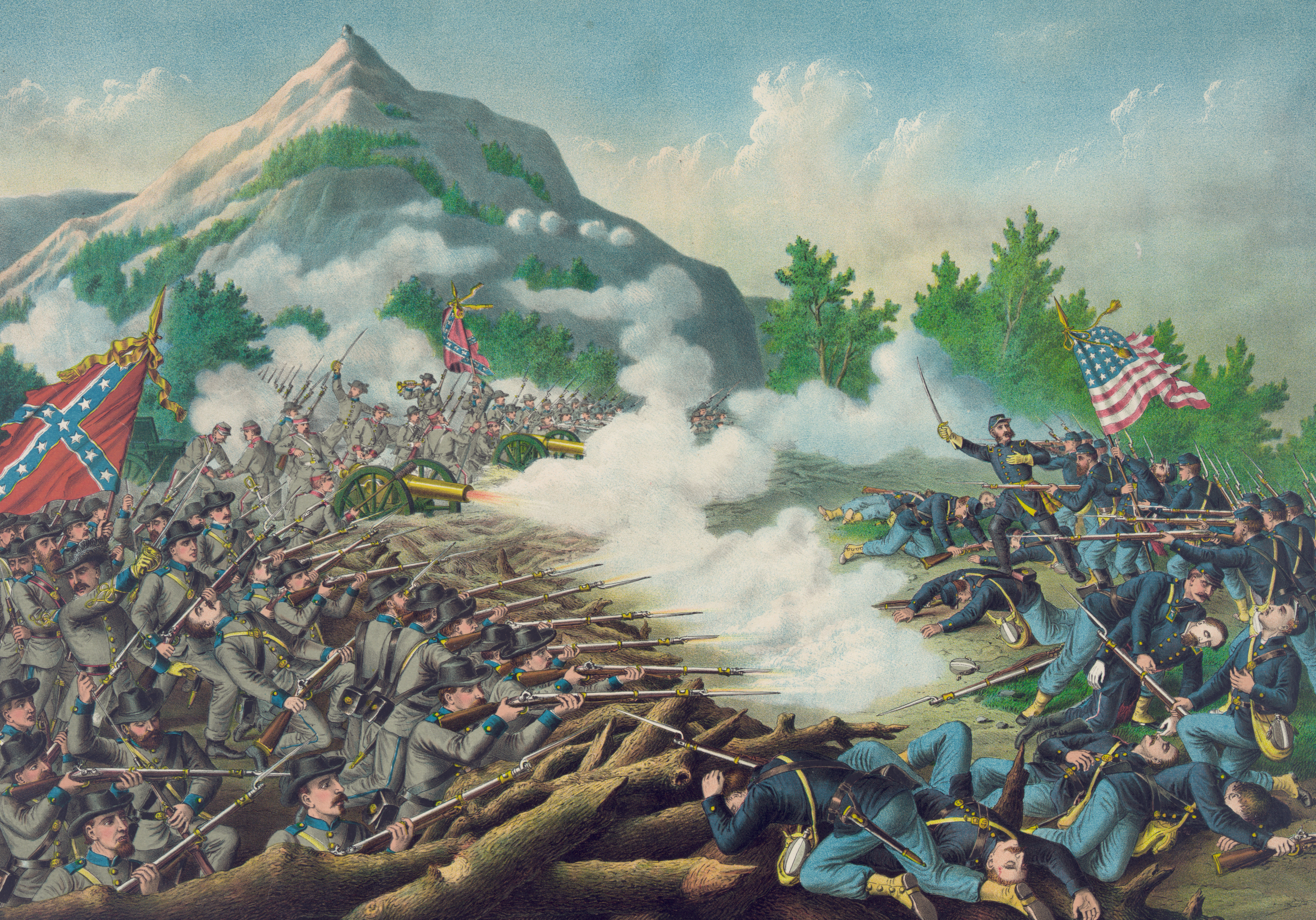
Battle of Kennesaw Mountain, June 27, 1864.

The Civil War ended on April 26, 1865, when Joseph E. Johnston surrendered his armies in the Carolinas campaign to U.S. Army General William Tecumseh Sherman. Several battles are mentioned or depicted in Gone with the Wind.

==== Early and mid war years ====
- Seven Days Battles, June 25 – July 1, 1862, Richmond, Virginia, a Confederate victory.
- Battle of Fredericksburg, December 11–15, 1862, Fredericksburg, Virginia, a Confederate victory.
- Streight's Raid, April 19 – May 3, 1863, in northern Alabama. U.S. Army Colonel Abel Streight and his men were captured by Confederate General Nathan Bedford Forrest.
- Battle of Chancellorsville, April 30 – May 6, 1863, in Spotsylvania County, Virginia, near the village of Chancellorsville, Virginia, a Confederate victory.

Ashley Wilkes is stationed on the Rapidan River, Virginia, in the winter of 1863, later captured and sent to a U.S. Army prisoner-of-war camp, Rock Island Arsenal.

- Siege of Vicksburg, May 18 – July 4, 1863, Vicksburg, Mississippi, a Union victory.
- Battle of Gettysburg, July 1–3, 1863, fought in and around Gettysburg, Pennsylvania, a Union victory. "They expected death. They did not expect defeat."
- Battle of Chickamauga, September 19–20, 1863, northwestern Georgia. The first fighting in Georgia and the most significant Union defeat.
- Chattanooga campaign, November–December 1863, Tennessee, a Union victory. The city became the supply and logistics base for Sherman's 1864 Atlanta Campaign.

==== Atlanta campaign ====
Map of the Atlanta campaign

The Atlanta campaign (May–September 1864) took place in northwest Georgia and the area around Atlanta.

Confederate General Johnston fights and retreats from Dalton (May 7–13) to Resaca (May 13–15) to Kennesaw Mountain (June 27). Union General Sherman suffers heavy losses to the entrenched Confederate army. Unable to pass through Kennesaw, Sherman swings his men around to the Chattahoochee River, where the Confederate army is waiting on the opposite side of the river. Once again, General Sherman flanks the Confederate army, forcing Johnston to retreat to Peachtree Creek (July 20), five miles northeast of Atlanta.

- Battle of Atlanta, July 22, 1864, just southeast of Atlanta. The city would not fall until September 2, 1864—heavy losses for Confederate John Bell Hood.
- Battle of Ezra Church, July 28, 1864, Sherman's failed attack west of Atlanta where the railroad entered the city.
- Battle of Utoy Creek, August 5–7, 1864, Sherman's failed attempt to break the railroad line at East Point, into Atlanta from the west, heavy Union losses.
- Battle of Jonesborough, August 31 – September 1, 1864, Sherman successfully cut the railroad lines from the south into Atlanta. The city of Atlanta was abandoned by General Hood and then occupied by Union troops for the rest of the war.

==== March to the Sea ====
Sherman's March to the Sea was conducted in Georgia during November and December 1864.

==== President Lincoln's murder ====
Although Abraham Lincoln is mentioned in the novel 14 times, no reference is made to his assassination on April 14, 1865.

=== Manhood ===
Somebody's darling! so young and so brave! Wearing still on his pale, sweet face – Soon to be hid by the dust of the grave – The lingering light of his boyhood's grace!

— Somebody's Darling by Marie La Coste, of Georgia.

Ashley Wilkes is the beau ideal of Southern manhood in Scarlett's eyes. A planter by inheritance, Ashley knew the Confederate cause had died. However, Ashley's name signifies paleness. His "pallid skin literalizes the idea of Confederate death".

Ashley contemplates leaving Georgia for New York City. Had he gone North, he would have joined numerous other ex-Confederate transplants there. Ashley, embittered by war, tells Scarlett he has been "in a state of suspended animation" since the surrender. He feels he is not "shouldering a man's burden" at Tara and believes he is "much less than a man – much less, indeed, than a woman".

A "young girl's dream of the Perfect Knight", Ashley is like a young girl himself. With his "poet's eye", Ashley has a "feminine sensitivity". Scarlett is angered by the "slur of effeminacy flung at Ashley" when her father tells her the Wilkes family was "born queer". (Mitchell's use of the word "queer" is for its sexual connotation because queer, in the 1930s, was associated with homosexuality.) Ashley's effeminacy is associated with his appearance, his lack of forcefulness, and sexual impotence. He rides, plays poker, and drinks like "proper men", but his heart is not in it, Gerald claims. The embodiment of castration, Ashley wears the head of Medusa on his cravat pin.

Scarlett's love interest, Ashley Wilkes, lacks manliness, and her husbands – the "calf-like" Charles Hamilton, and the "old-maid in britches", Frank Kennedy – are unmanly as well. Mitchell is critiquing masculinity in southern society since Reconstruction. Even Rhett Butler, the well-groomed dandy, is effeminate or "gay-coded". Charles, Frank, and Ashley represent the impotence of the post-war white South. Its power and influence have been diminished.

=== Scallawag ===
The word "scallawag" is defined as a loafer, a vagabond, or a rogue. Scallawag had a special meaning after the Civil War as an epithet for a white Southerner who accepted and supported Republican reforms. Mitchell defines scallawags as "Southerners who had turned Republican very profitably." Rhett Butler is accused of being a "damned Scallawag". In addition to scallawags, Mitchell portrays other types of scoundrels in the novel: Yankees, carpetbaggers, Republicans, prostitutes, and overseers. In the early years of the Civil War, Rhett is called a "scoundrel" for his "selfish gains" profiteering as a blockade-runner.

As a scallawag, Rhett is despised. He is the "dark, mysterious, and slightly malevolent hero loose in the world". Literary scholars have identified elements of Mitchell's first husband, Berrien "Red" Upshaw, in the character of Rhett. Another sees the image of Italian actor Rudolph Valentino, whom Margaret Mitchell interviewed as a young reporter for The Atlanta Journal. Fictional hero Rhett Butler has a "swarthy face, flashing teeth and dark alert eyes". He is a "scamp, blackguard, without scruple or honor".

== Themes ==
=== Survival ===
If Gone with the Wind has a theme it is that of survival. What makes some people come through catastrophes and others, apparently just as able, strong, and brave, go under? It happens in every upheaval. Some people survive; others don't. What qualities are in those who fight their way through triumphantly that are lacking in those that go under? I only know that survivors used to call that quality "gumption." So I wrote about people who had gumption and people who didn't.
— Margaret Mitchell, 1936

=== Colors ===
Mitchell's use of color in the novel is symbolic and open to interpretation. Red, green, and a variety of hues of each of these colors are the predominant palette of colors related to Scarlett.

=== Irishness ===
In Gone with the Wind, Mitchell explores some complexities in racial issues. A Yankee woman asked Scarlett for advice on whom to appoint as a nurse for her children; Scarlett suggested a "darky", much to the disgust of the Yankee woman who was seeking an Irish maid, a "Bridget". African Americans and Irish Americans are treated "in precisely the same way" in Gone with the Wind, writes David O'Connell in his 1996 book, The Irish Roots of Margaret Mitchell's Gone With the Wind. Ethnic slurs on the Irish and Irish stereotypes pervade the novel, O'Connell claims, and Scarlett is not an exception to the terminology. Conversely, Irish scholar Geraldine Higgins notes that Jonas Wilkerson labels Scarlett: "you highflying, bogtrotting Irish". Higgins says that, as the Irish American O'Haras were enslavers and held African Americans in bondage, the two ethnic groups are not equivalent in the ethnic hierarchy of the novel.

== Critical reception ==
=== Reviews ===
The sales of Margaret Mitchell's novel in the summer of 1936, as the nation was recovering from the Great Depression and at the virtually unprecedented price of three dollars, reached about 1 million by the end of December. The book was a bestseller when reviews began appearing in national magazines. Herschel Brickell, a critic for the New York Evening Post, lauded Mitchell for the way she "tosses out the window all the thousands of technical tricks our novelists have been playing with for the past twenty years."

Ralph Thompson, a book reviewer for The New York Times, was critical of the length of the novel and wrote in June 1936:

I happen to feel that the book would have been infinitely better had it been edited down to say, 500 pages, but there speaks the harassed daily reviewer as well as the would-be judicious critic. Very nearly every reader will agree, no doubt, that a more disciplined and less prodigal piece of work would have more nearly done justice to the subject-matter.

Some reviewers compared the book to William Thackeray's Vanity Fair and Leo Tolstoy's War and Peace. Mitchell claimed Charles Dickens as an inspiration and called Gone with the Wind a "'Victorian' type novel."

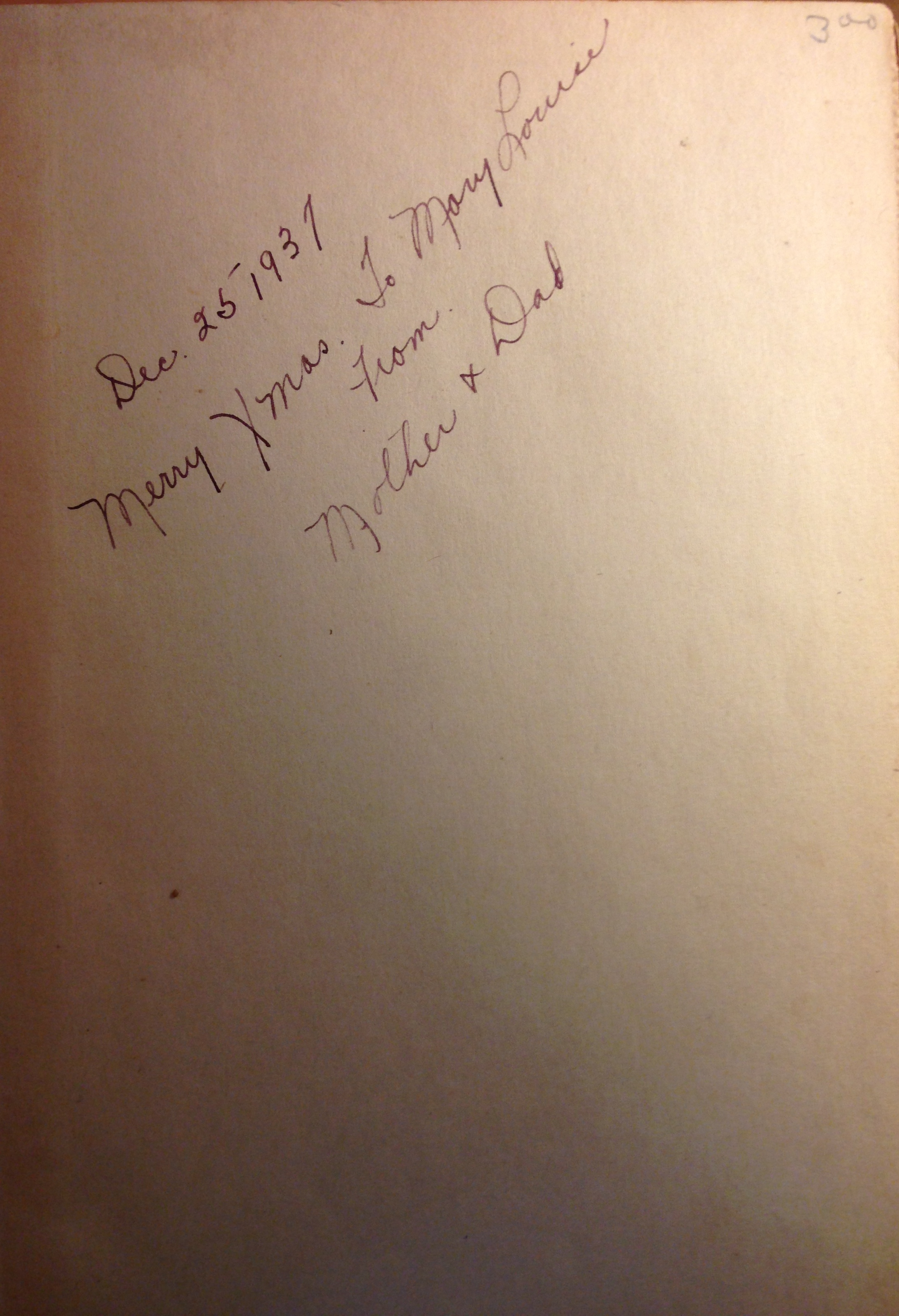
Mitchell worried the high $3.00 price would ruin its chance for success. When Mary Louise received this copy from Mother and Dad in December 1937, the novel was the best American fiction bestseller for the second year.

Helen Keller read the 12-volume Braille edition. The book brought her fond memories of her Southern infancy, but she also felt sadness compared to what she knew about the South. Keller's father had enslaved people and fought as a Confederate captain, but Helen would later support the NAACP and the ACLU.

The book was popular in Nazi Germany; within two days of its publication there in 1937, it had sold 12 thousand copies; by 1941 it had sold 276 thousand copies. William L. Shirer noted in 1939 that it was one of the most popular novels in Germany; the novel for the most part received positive reviews. The novel continued to have high sales until 1942, when books by American authors were banned.

=== Scholarship: racial, ethnicity and social issues ===
Gone with the Wind has been criticized for its stereotypical and derogatory portrayal of African Americans in the 19th century South. Former field hands during the early days of Reconstruction are described as behaving "as creatures of small intelligence might naturally be expected to do. Like monkeys or small children turned loose among treasured objects whose value is beyond their comprehension, they ran wild – either from perverse pleasure in destruction or simply because of their ignorance."

Commenting on this passage of the novel, Jabari Asim, author of The N Word: Who Can Say It, Who Shouldn't, and Why, says, in "one of the more charitable passages in Gone With the Wind, Margaret Mitchell hesitated to blame black 'insolence' during Reconstruction solely on 'mean niggers', of which, she said, there were few even in slavery days."

The novel has been criticized for promoting plantation values and romanticizing the white supremacy of the antebellum South. Mitchell biographer Marianne Walker, author of Margaret Mitchell and John Marsh: The Love Story Behind Gone with the Wind, believes those who attack the book on these grounds have not read it. She said that the popular 1939 film "promotes a false notion of the Old South". Mitchell was not involved in the screenplay or film production.

James Loewen, author of Lies My Teacher Told Me: Everything Your American History Textbook Got Wrong, says this novel is "profoundly racist and profoundly wrong".

The novel came under intense criticism for alleged racist and white supremacist themes in 2020 following the murder of George Floyd, and the ensuing protests and focus on systemic racism in the United States.

As a result of this criticism, the novel has faced challenges a number of times leading to a successful ban in Anaheim, California (1978) and an unsuccessful attempt to remove it from schools in Waukegan, Illinois (1984).

=== Reconstruction ===
Critics say that Mitchell downplayed the violent role of the Ku Klux Klan and their abuse of freedmen. Author Pat Conroy, in his preface to a later edition of the novel, describes Mitchell's portrayal of the Ku Klux Klan as having "the same romanticized role it had in The Birth of a Nation and appears to be a benign combination of the Elks Club and a men's equestrian society".

Regarding the historical inaccuracies of the novel, historian Richard N. Current points out:

No doubt it is indeed unfortunate that Gone with the Wind perpetuates many myths about Reconstruction, particularly with respect to blacks. Margaret Mitchell did not originate them and a young novelist can scarcely be faulted for not knowing what the majority of mature, professional historians did not know until many years later.

=== Awards and recognition ===
In 1937, Margaret Mitchell received the Pulitzer Prize for Fiction for Gone with the Wind and the second annual National Book Award for Fiction from the American Booksellers Association. It is ranked as the second favorite book by American readers, just behind the Bible, according to a 2008 Harris poll. The poll found the novel has the strongest following among women, those aged 44 or more, both Southerners and Midwesterners, both whites and Hispanics, and those who have not attended college. In a 2014 Harris poll, Mitchell's novel ranked again as second, after the Bible. The novel is on the list of best-selling books. As of 2010, over 30 million copies have been printed in the United States and abroad. More than 24 editions of Gone with the Wind have been issued in China. Time magazine critics Lev Grossman and Richard Lacayo included the novel on their list of the 100 best English-language novels published between 1923 and 2005. In 2003, the book was listed at number 21 on the BBC's The Big Read poll of the UK's "best-loved novel".

=== Censorship ===
Gone with the Wind frequently has been the center of controversy.

In 1978, the book was banned from English classrooms in the Anaheim Union High School District in Anaheim, California.

In 1984, an alderman in Waukegan, Illinois, challenged the book's inclusion on the reading list of the Waukegan School District on the grounds of "racism" and "unacceptable language". He objected to the frequent use of the racial slur nigger. He also objected to several other books: The Nigger of the 'Narcissus', Uncle Tom's Cabin, and Adventures of Huckleberry Finn for the same reason.

== Adaptations ==
Gone with the Wind has been adapted several times for various media:

- The novel was adapted into the classic Academy Award-winning 1939 film. The film has been considered one of the greatest Hollywood movies ever made, and upon release, was immensely popular in its own right. It stars Clark Gable, Vivien Leigh and Olivia de Havilland.
- The book was adapted into a musical, Scarlett, which opened in Tokyo in 1970 (in 1966 it was produced as a nine-hour play without music), and in London in 1972, where it was reduced to four hours. The London production opened in 1973 in Los Angeles and again in Dallas in 1976.
- The Japanese Takarazuka Revue produced a musical adaptation of the novel, Kaze to Tomo ni Sarinu, which was performed by the all-female Moon Troupe in 1977. The most recent performance was in January 2014 by the Moon Troupe, with Todoroki Yuu as Rhett Butler and Ryu Masaki as Scarlett O'Hara.
- An unabridged audiobook adaptation narrated by Liza Ross was released in 1998, winning the UK Talkies Awards. This edition was re-released in 2025.
- A 2003 French musical adaptation was produced by Gérard Presgurvic, Autant en emporte le vent.
- The book was adapted into a British musical, Gone with the Wind, and opened in 2008 in the U.K. at the New London Theatre in the West End.
- A full-length three-act classical ballet version, with a score arranged from the works of Antonín Dvořák and choreographed by Lilla Pártay, premiered in 2007 as performed by the Hungarian National Ballet. It was revived in their 2013 season.
- A new stage adaptation by Niki Landau premiered at the Manitoba Theatre Centre in Winnipeg, Canada in January 2013.
- The comic-book adaptation Gone with the wind by Pierre Alary was published in French in 2023–2025.

== In popular culture ==
Gone with the Wind has appeared in many places and forms in popular culture:

=== Books, television and more ===
- A 1945 cartoon by World War II cartoonist Bill Mauldin shows an American soldier lying on the ground with Margaret Mitchell's bullet-riddled book. The caption reads: "Dear, Dear Miss Mitchell, You will probably think this is an awful funny letter to get from a soldier, but I was carrying your big book, Gone with the Wind, under my shirt and a ..."
- The novelist Vladimir Nabokov considered Gone with the Wind to be a "cheap novel", and in his Bend Sinister a book meant to resemble it is used as toilet paper.
- In the season 3 episode of I Love Lucy, "Lucy Writes a Novel", which aired on April 5, 1954, "Lucy" (Lucille Ball) reads about a housewife who makes a fortune writing a novel in her spare time. Lucy writes a novel, which she titles Real Gone with the Wind.
- Gone with the Wind is the book that S. E. Hinton's runaway teenage characters, Ponyboy and Johnny, read while hiding from the law in the young adult novel The Outsiders (1967).
- A film parody titled "Went with the Wind!" aired in a 1976 episode of The Carol Burnett Show. Burnett as Starlett descends a long staircase wearing a green curtain complete with hanging rod. The outfit, designed by Bob Mackie, is displayed at the Smithsonian Institution.
- Come Back With the Wind is a parody novel of Gone with the Wind by British comic writer Les Dawson, published in 1990. The story is set in a fictitious 20th century civil war between the North and the South of Britain. The main characters are Carla O'Mara and Red Butler, substituted for Scarlett O'Hara and Rhett Butler from the original story. (ISBN 9780450559068)
- Mad magazine created a parody of the novel "Groan with the Wind" (1991), in which Ashley was renamed Ashtray and Rhett became Rhetch. It ends with Rhetch and Ashtray running off together.
- A pictorial parody in which the slaves are white and the protagonists are black appeared in a 1995 issue of Vanity Fair titled "Scarlett 'n the Hood".
- In a MADtv comedy sketch (2007), "Slave Girl #8" introduces three alternative endings to the film. In one ending, Scarlett pursues Rhett wearing a jet pack.

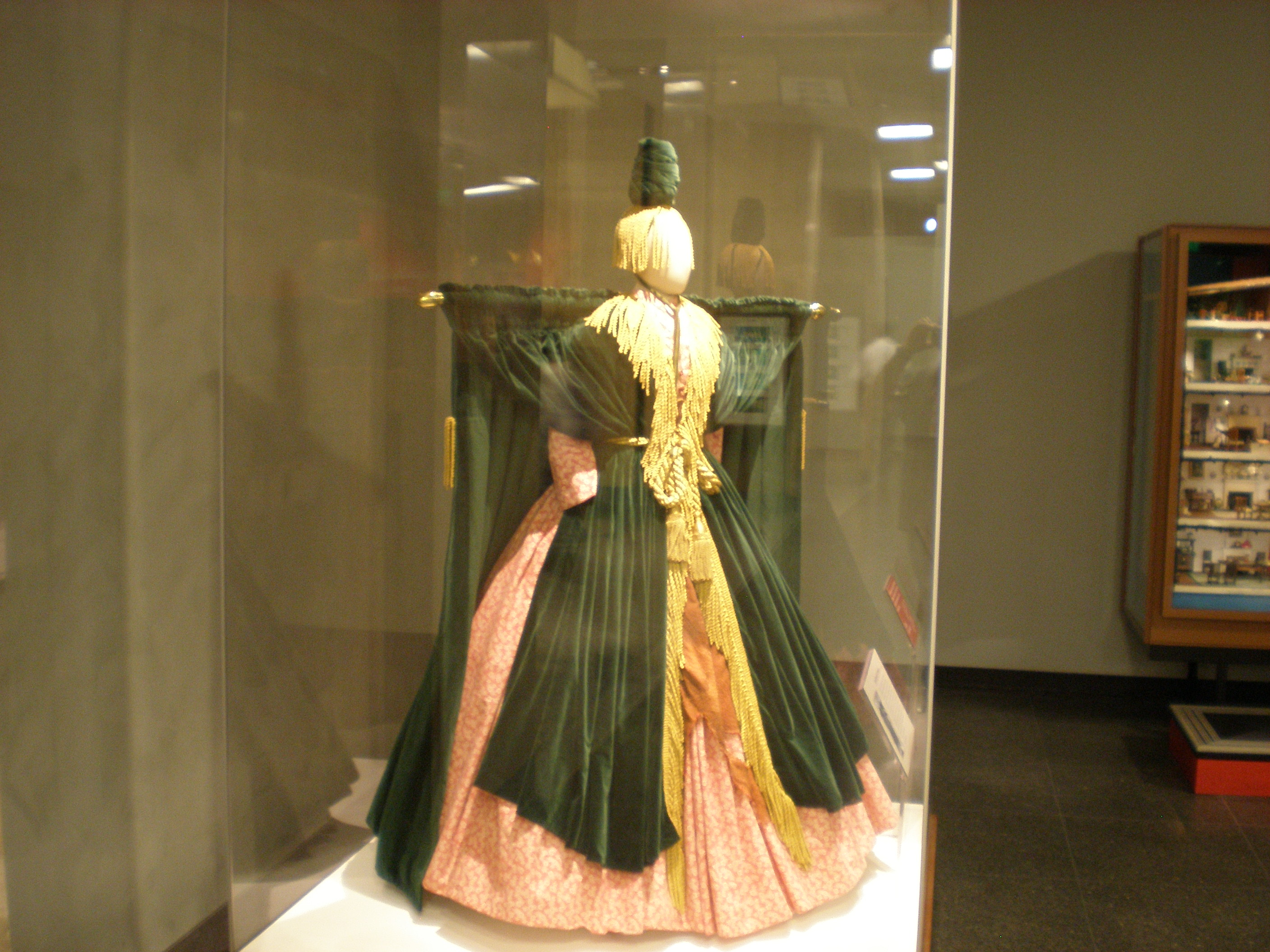
The "Curtain Dress" from The Carol Burnett Show on display at the Smithsonian Institution in 2009

=== Collectibles ===
On June 30, 1986, the 50th anniversary of the day Gone with the Wind went on sale, the U.S. Post Office issued a one-cent stamp showing an image of Margaret Mitchell. The stamp was designed by Ronald Adair and was part of the U.S. Postal Service's Great Americans series.

On September 10, 1998, the U.S. Post Office issued a 32-cent stamp as part of its Celebrate the Century series, recalling various important events in the 20th century. The stamp, designed by Howard Paine, displays the book with its original dust jacket, a white Magnolia blossom, and a hilt placed against a background of green velvet.

To commemorate the 75th anniversary (2011) of the publication of Gone with the Wind in 1936, Scribner published a paperback edition featuring the book's original jacket art.

=== The Windies ===
"The Windies" are Gone with the Wind fans who follow the latest news and events surrounding the book and film. They gather periodically in costumes from the film or dressed as Margaret Mitchell. Atlanta, Georgia, is their meeting place.

== Legacy ==
The novel appeals worldwide due to its universal themes: war, love, death, racial conflict, class, gender, and generation, which speak especially to women. In North Korea, readers relate to the novel's theme of survival, finding it to be "the most compelling message of the novel". Margaret Mitchell's personal collection of nearly 70 foreign language translations of her novel was given to the Atlanta Public Library after her death.

=== Perceptions of the Old South ===
One legacy of Gone with the Wind is the persistence in people's minds of its representation of the history of the Old South, and how the American Civil War and Reconstruction changed it. The film adaptation of the novel "amplified this effect", writes Joel Williamson. The plantation legend was burned into the public consciousness. Meanwhile, the book's racial themes became an enduring subject of academic discourse.

Helen Taylor wrote:

Gone with the Wind has almost certainly done its ideological work. It has sealed in popular imaginations a fascinated nostalgia for the glamorous southern plantation house and ordered hierarchical society in which slaves are "family" and there is a mystical bond between the landowner and the rich soil those slaves work for him.

David W. Blight wrote:

From this combination of Lost Cause voices, a reunited America arose pure, guiltless, and assured that the deep conflicts in its past had been imposed upon it by otherworldly forces. The side that lost was especially assured that its cause was true and good. One of the ideas the reconciliationist Lost Cause instilled deeply into the national culture is that even when Americans lose, they win. Such was the message, the indomitable spirit, that Margaret Mitchell infused into her character Scarlett O'Hara in Gone With the Wind.

In its entry on Margaret Mitchell, the Encyclopædia Britannica notes:

The extent to which readers believe Gone With the Wind has, and has not, accurately recorded this period of American history—and what duty they believe Mitchell had to do so—determines how they assess Mitchell herself.

Mitchell's fictional account of the war and its aftermath has influenced how the world has viewed the city of Atlanta for successive generations.

=== Differences with the film ===
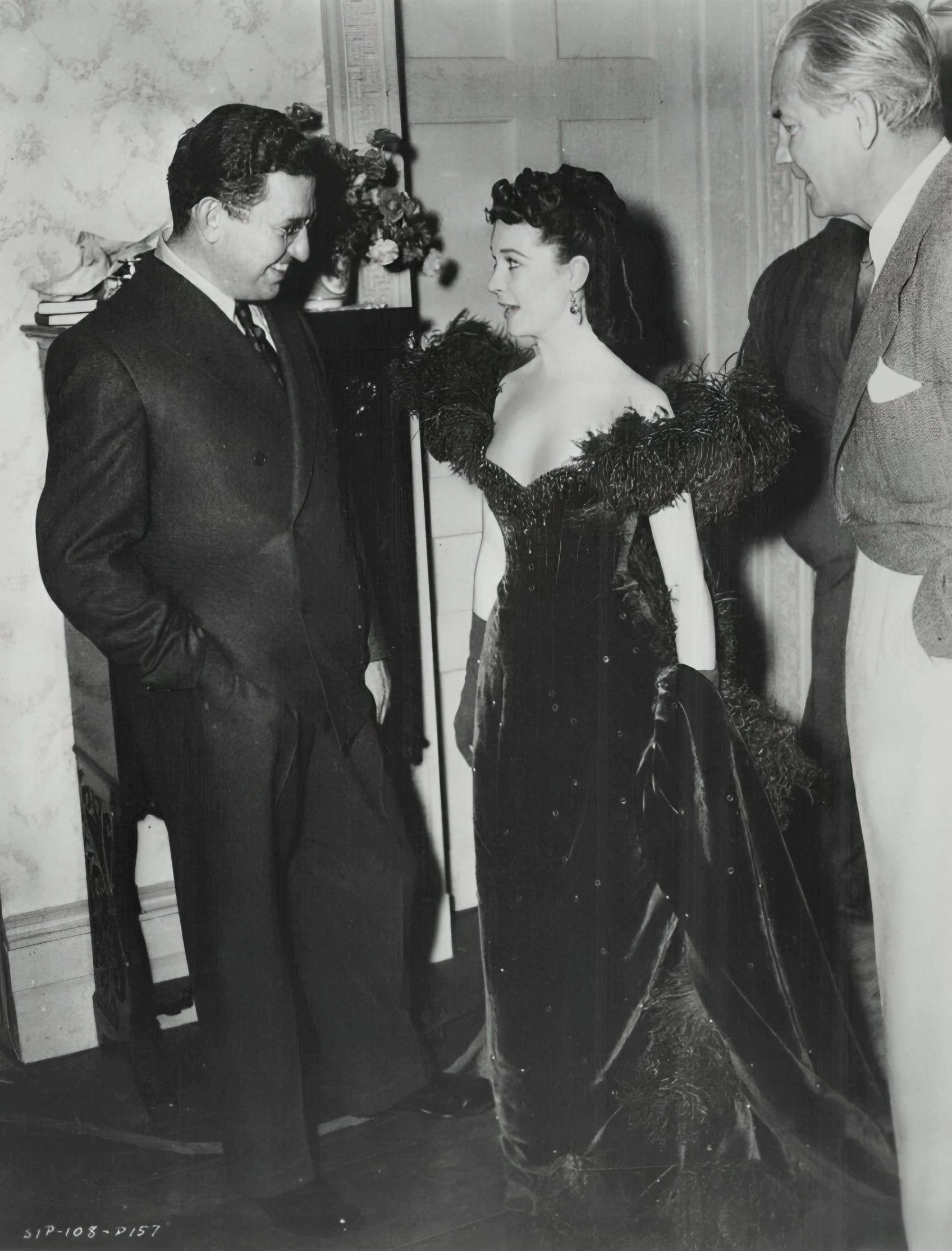
David O. Selznick, producer of the film Gone with the Wind, with lead actress Vivien Leigh and director Victor Fleming

Some readers of the novel have seen the film first and read the novel afterward. One difference between the film and the novel is the staircase scene, in which Rhett carries Scarlett up the stairs. In the film, Scarlett weakly struggles and does not scream as Rhett starts up the stairs. In the novel, "he hurt her and she cried out, muffled, frightened," writes Celia R. Daileader.

Earlier in the novel, in an intended rape at Shantytown (Chapter 44), Scarlett is attacked by a black man who rips open her dress while a white man grabs hold of her horse's bridle. She is rescued by another black man, Big Sam. In the film, she is attacked by a white man while a black man grabs the horse's bridle. Whereas in the book her avengers are stated to be members of the Ku Klux Klan, in the film they constitute an unnamed revenge group. Producer David O. Selznick was deliberate in deviating from aspects of the novel, conscious of the debate over racism and segregation in America, and the ongoing genocide at the time in Nazi Germany. He told screenwriter Sidney Howard, "I, for one, have no desire to produce an anti-Negro film either. In our picture I think we have to be awfully careful that the Negroes come out decidedly on the right side of the ledger."

=== Place in American literature ===
The Library of Congress began a multiyear "Celebration of the Book" in July 2012 with an exhibition on Books That Shaped America and an initial list of 88 books by American authors that have influenced American lives. Gone with the Wind was included in the Library's list. Librarian of Congress, James H. Billington said:

This list is a starting point. It is not a register of the 'best' American books – although many of them fit that description. Rather, the list is intended to spark a national conversation on books written by Americans that have influenced our lives, whether they appear on this initial list or not.

Among books on the list considered to be the Great American Novel were Moby-Dick, Adventures of Huckleberry Finn, The Great Gatsby, The Grapes of Wrath, The Catcher in the Rye, Invisible Man, and To Kill a Mockingbird.

=== Margaret Mitchell Estate ===
On August 16, 2012, the Archdiocese of Atlanta announced that it had been bequeathed a 50% stake in the trademarks and literary rights to Gone With the Wind from the estate of Margaret Mitchell's deceased nephew, Joseph Mitchell. Margaret Mitchell had separated from the Catholic Church. However, one of Mitchell's biographers, Darden Asbury Pyron, stated that Margaret Mitchell had "an intense relationship" with her mother, who was a Roman Catholic.

== Publication history ==
=== Original manuscript ===
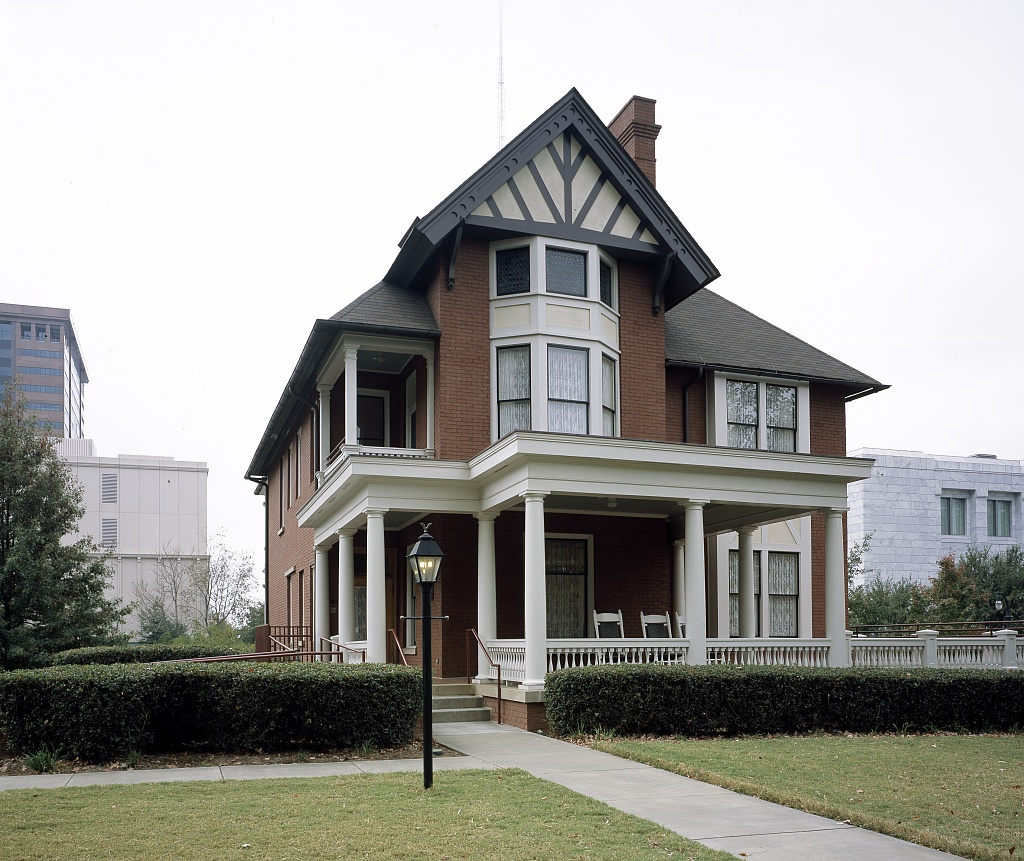
The Crescent Apartments in Atlanta, Georgia, where Margaret Mitchell wrote her novel, is now operated as the Margaret Mitchell House and Museum.

Although some of Mitchell's papers and documents related to the writing of Gone with the Wind were burned after her death, many documents, including assorted draft chapters, were preserved. The last four chapters of the novel are held by the Pequot Library of Southport, Connecticut.

=== Publication and reprintings (1936 – US) ===
The first printing of 10,000 copies contains the original publication date: "Published May, 1936". After the book was chosen as the Book-of-the-Month Club's selection for July, the publication was delayed until June 30. The second printing of 25,000 copies (and subsequent printings) contains the release date: "Published June, 1936". The third printing of 15,000 copies was made in June 1936. Additionally, 50,000 copies were printed for the Book-of-the-Month Club July selection. Gone with the Wind was officially released to the American public on June 30, 1936.

=== Sequels and prequels ===
Although Mitchell refused to write a sequel to Gone with the Wind, Mitchell's estate authorized Alexandra Ripley to write a sequel, which was titled Scarlett. The book was subsequently adapted into a television mini-series in 1994. A second sequel was authorized by Mitchell's estate titled Rhett Butler's People, by Donald McCaig. The novel parallels Gone with the Wind from Rhett Butler's perspective. In 2010, Mitchell's estate authorized McCaig to write a prequel, which follows the life of the house servant Mammy, whom McCaig names "Ruth". The novel, Ruth's Journey, was released in 2014.

The copyright holders of Gone with the Wind attempted to suppress publication of The Wind Done Gone by Alice Randall, which retold the story from the perspective of the enslaved people. A federal appeals court denied the plaintiffs an injunction (Suntrust v. Houghton Mifflin) against publication on the basis that the book was a parody and therefore protected by the First Amendment. The parties subsequently settled out of court, and the book became a New York Times Best Seller.

A book sequel unauthorized by the copyright holders, The Winds of Tara by Katherine Pinotti, was blocked from publication in the United States. The novel was republished in Australia, avoiding U.S. copyright restrictions.

Away from copyright lawsuits, Internet fan fiction has proved to be a fertile medium for sequels (some of them book-length), parodies, and rewritings of Gone with the Wind.

Numerous unauthorized sequels to Gone with the Wind have been published in Russia, mostly under the pseudonym Yuliya Hilpatrik, a cover for a consortium of writers. The New York Times states that most have a "Slavic" flavor.

Several sequels were written in Hungarian under the pseudonym Audrey D. Milland or Audrey Dee Milland by at least four different authors (who are named in the colophon as translators to make the book seem a translation from the English original, a procedure common in the 1990s but prohibited by law since then). The first picks up where Ripley's Scarlett ended; the next is about Scarlett's daughter Cat. Other books include a prequel trilogy about Scarlett's grandmother, Solange, and a three-part miniseries about a supposed illegitimate daughter of Carreen.

=== Copyright status ===
Gone with the Wind has been in the public domain in Australia and Canada since 1999 (50 years after Margaret Mitchell's death). On January 1, 2020, the book entered the public domain in the European Union (70 years after the author's death). Under an extension of copyright law, Gone with the Wind will not enter the public domain in the United States until January 1, 2032.

== See also ==
- Lost Laysen, 1916 novella also written by Margaret Mitchell
- Southern literature
- Southern Renaissance
- Le Monde's 100 Books of the Century
- Confederate novel
