= Rural Home =

Plantation house in Clayton County, Georgia

Coordinates: 33°27′52.6″N 84°21′34.6″W

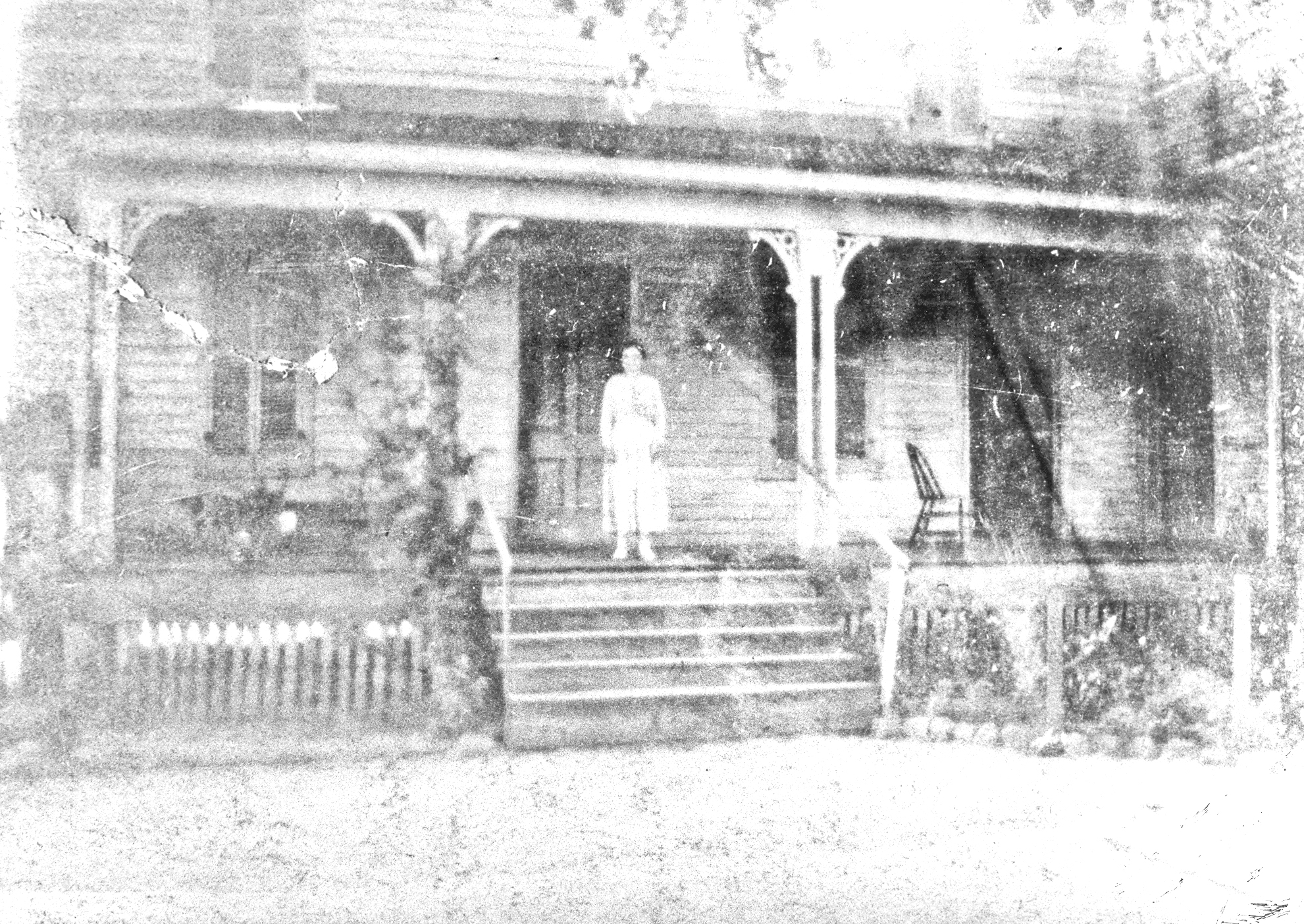
Rural Home circa 1920. The woman on the porch is probably Margaret Mitchell.

Rural Home, also known as the Fitzgerald House, was a plantation house in Clayton County, Georgia. Built in the 1830s, the house was acquired by Philip Fitzgerald, a planter and Irish immigrant, in 1836. Rural Home was the childhood home of Annie Fitzgerald Stephens, the grandmother of author Margaret Mitchell, and was the center of a large cotton plantation. The plantation served as inspiration for Mitchell's fictional Tara Plantation in her novel Gone With the Wind. It was looted but ultimately withstood Sherman's March to the Sea during the American Civil War and functioned as a family home until the 1970s. In 1982 it was moved to a temporary site near Lovejoy. After being badly damaged in a storm, the house was demolished in 2005.

== History ==
=== Antebellum period ===
Rural Home was built in the late 1820s or early 1830s on land that had been taken from the Muscogee people due to the Indian Removal Act. The land, located across the Flint River about six miles east of Fayetteville and about five miles southeast of Jonesboro, was first purchased by John Ward, who likely never lived there. He sold the land to John Chambers for $130 on November 30, 1831. In 1835 or 1836, the property was acquired by an Irish immigrant, Philip Fitzgerald, for $200. According to Fitzgerald family tradition, a relatively newly-built wood frame house was already on the property. The house was two stories and included a dining room, bedroom, and kitchen on the first floor and two bedrooms on the second floor. The house was most likely built by John Chambers and was one of the better antebellum dwellings in the county.

Fitzgerald married Eleanor McGhan, a member of an Irish Catholic family with ties to colonial Maryland, in 1838. They had ten children on the plantation, including Ann Elizabeth Stephens, the mother of Maybelle Stephens Mitchell and grandmother of Margaret Mitchell. Seven of the ten children survived to adulthood; Ann Elizabeth, Agnes Bridget, Adele, Katherine, Isabelle, Sarah, and Mary Ellen. Two of the daughters, Mary Ellen and Sarah, never married and lived their entire lives at Rural Home. Eleanor disliked living on the plantation, which expanded to 1,000 acres, reportedly telling a granddaughter that she "spent all of her young married life in.. a small African village" over which she exercised "care and attention". The plantation house was referred to as "Rural Home" by the Fitzgeralds to distinguish it from their home in town.

Fitzgerald grew cotton on the plantation, depending on slave labor. They also raised livestock, farmed bees, and grew maize, wheat, and oats. At the outbreak of the American Civil War, Fitzgerald was one of the largest slaveowners in the region. Of the 171 slaveowners in Clayton County in 1860, Fitzgerald was behind only Solomon Dorsey and Sherod H. Gray. Fitzgerald continued to purchase property adjacent to Rural Home, including the 1,209-acre McElroy plantation, in 1853. By 1854, Fitzgerlald owned 2,375 acres of land and, by the time of the Civil War, he owned more than 2,400 acres. Despite being one of the wealthier planters of the region, Fitzgerald made few architectural changes to Rural Home prior to the war. In the 1850s, many other local plantation houses were being remodeled with Neoclassical features. Fitzgerald did replace the simple portico at the front of the house, adding a full-width porch, columns, and Italianate trim.

=== Civil War ===
During Sherman's March to the Sea in 1864, Union troops arrived at Rural Home, where they destroyed or consumed $60,000 worth of cotton, produce, and other property. Fitzgerald's daughter, Ann Elizabeth, allegedly was granted protection of the house from the invading Union Army by General Sherman. The house was looted, but not destroyed.

=== Reconstruction and later years ===
During the Reconstruction era following the war, the Fitzgeralds made drastic changes to the house. In 1873, a two-story balloon-framed addition with six rooms and high ceilings, laid out in an L-shaped plan, was added to the north end of the original house. Finishing with lapped siding and featuring end gables with elaborate baseboards, the house became an example of Eastlake architecture. The original house was renovated as well, with the removal of end chimneys and fireplaces, replaced by a center chimney and the addition of closets where the staircase had originally been. Three additional bedrooms were also added, and a spacious parlor. One of the Fitzgerald daughters, Katherine, married William Stephens in the house's parlor in 1875.

During this time, the plantation was being farmed by tenant farmers and share-croppers who continued to grow cotton.

Philip Fitzgerald died in May 1880, leaving the house and 503.5 acres of land to his wife and unmarried children. He specified in his will that the home should serve as a "refuge" for any of his children or grandchildren should they become widowed or destitute. In the 1920s, legal disputes ensued regarding the terms of the will, leading to a rift in the family. The two unmarried Fitzgerald daughters, Mary Ellen and Sarah, continued to live at Rural Home, often hosting relatives at the house, including their niece, Maybelle Stephens Mitchell and her daughter, Margaret Mitchell. Margaret Mitchell's experiences at Rural Home inspired the fictional Tara Plantation in her novel Gone With the Wind. The plantation suffered major losses in 1919 with the boll weevil invasion throughout the Georgia piedmont region, which killed much of the crop. By the end of World War I, the Fitzgeralds failed to produce any cotton. They turned to their sister, Ann Elizabeth, who paid for the taxes on the house. Ann Elizabeth attempted to return to the house to take up residence after living as a widow, per the terms of her father's will, but her sisters and niece prevented it. Ann Elizabeth filed a lawsuit in the Clayton County Superior Court to gain control of the property, but the court sided in favor of her sisters. In 1928, Eugenia Gress, a daughter of Ann Elizabeth, got quit-claim deeds from the other Fitzgerald heirs, paid her aunt and cousin $5,000, and took possession of the house.

Gress set about fixing up the dilapidated Rural Home, enclosing the breezeway and remodeling the kitchen. Gress moved her mother into the house and retained the property after her mother's death. In 1937, she rented Rural Home to her brother, Alexander H. Stephens, and his wife, Mary Grace Rogers. They continued to operate the plantation as a working farm until the end of World War II. In the 1940s, indoor plumbing and electric lighting were installed in the house.

=== Demolition ===
In 1958, Grace Rogers Stephens died. Alexander Stephens, now age 80, was no longer considered able to care for the home in the opinion of Gress. She revoked the 1937 rental agreement and took control of Rural Home. It remained a rental property for the next 40 years. Gress died in 1966, and the remains of the estate were placed in trust for her children. The house was rented for a few more years, but by 1980, the value of the land was worth more than the rundown house and outbuildings. The house and other buildings were removed from the original site following a survey by the Historic Preservation Section of the Georgia Department of Natural Resources in November 1977.

In July 1980, Betty Shingler Talmadge, the ex-wife of Senator Herman Talmadge, bought the house and moved it to her plantation home in nearby Lovejoy. She had the 1873 addition dismantled, and she stored the framing and finish materials in an old milk barn on her property; the original antebellum house and kitchen were moved intact to a field across the drive from her house.

Talmadge died on November 7, 2005, never finishing her plans for Rural Home. On July 6, 2005, a tornado knocked the house off its temporary foundation. Subsequently, the house was dismantled.
