= The Wind Done Gone =

2001 novel by Alice Randall

- Author: Alice Randall
- Language: English
- Publisher: Houghton Mifflin
- Publication date: 1 May 2001
- Publication place: United States
- Media type: Print (hardback & paperback)
- Pages: 210 pp (first edition, hardback)
- ISBN: 0-618-10450-X (first edition, hardback)
- OCLC: 45002181
- Dewey Decimal: 813/.6 21
- LC Class: PS3568.A486 W56 2001

The Wind Done Gone (2001) is the first novel written by Alice Randall. It is a historical novel that tells an alternative account of the story in the American novel Gone with the Wind (1936) by Margaret Mitchell. While the story of Gone with the Wind focuses on the life of the daughter of a wealthy slave owner, Scarlett O'Hara, The Wind Done Gone tells the story of the life of slaves through Cynara, a slavewoman during the same time period and events.

The title is an African American Vernacular English play on the original's title. Cynara's name comes from the Ernest Dowson poem Non sum qualís eram bonae sub regno Cynarae, frequently shortened to Cynara. A line from Cynara ("I have forgot much, Cynara! gone with the wind") was the origin of the title of Mitchell's novel.

== Plot summary ==
The Wind Done Gone is narrated through the diary of Cynara, a mixed-race enslaved woman who is the daughter of Mammy (Pallas) and Planter, the white master of the plantation, making her the half-sister of “Other” (the Scarlett O’Hara analogue). Cynara grows up feeling neglected, overshadowed by Mammy’s devotion to Other, and is eventually sold away as a teenager to prevent scandal.

Years later, after Mammy’s death, Cynara returns to Tata (the Tara analogue). There she confronts memories of her divided family and reads a letter written by Mammy that reveals her mother’s complicated feelings toward her—both pride in her intelligence and regret at having failed her. Cynara also learns of Other’s death, which forces her to reflect on the rivalry that shaped her life.

Cynara becomes the mistress of R. (the Rhett Butler analogue), who has grown estranged from Other. Their relationship is both intimate and pragmatic, offering Cynara material security but also underscoring her precarious social position.

During Reconstruction, Cynara travels with R. to Washington, D.C., where she encounters prominent Black political leaders. She begins a relationship with a Black congressman, but recognizing the demands of his career and marriage, she entrusts their newborn child to him and his wife so the child may be raised within a stable household.

The novel closes with Cynara’s diary entries asserting her own perspective on the decline of the Old South and the rise of Jim Crow. Through her writing, she rejects the romanticized myths of Gone with the Wind and reclaims her agency, declaring a history centered on her own voice rather than on the white plantation family.

== Characters ==
- Cynara—The narrator of the novel, the recently freed slave is the daughter of white plantation owner Planter and his slave Mammy. She has a lifelong rivalry with her half-sister Other, sparked by jealousy that Mammy paid more attention to the white baby. They both came to love R.
- Mammy—Cynara's mother and Other's wet nurse, Mammy doted on Other while neglecting her own daughter. Her masters believe she is a loyal slave, but the other slaves suspect that she killed Lady and Planter's male children—given to her to nurse—so that Planter would be Cotton Farm's last white master. Her real name, Pallas, is so rarely used that her daughter didn't learn it until after her death. A clear parallel to Gone with the Wind's Mammy, she is the only major character called by the same name in both books.
- Other—The daughter of Planter and Lady, Other formed a strong bond with her wet nurse Mammy. When her youngest daughter dies in an accident and her husband R. leaves her, she returns to Mammy and the Cotton Farm. Parallel to Scarlett O'Hara in Gone with the Wind.
- R.—Other's husband R. leaves his wife and takes Cynara as a mistress and kept woman. Cynara sees him as a prize that she can win in her rivalry with her half-sister Other. While R. loves Cynara for her beauty, he never tries to understand her. Parallel to Rhett Butler in Gone with the Wind.
- Beauty—A brothel owner who once owned Cynara, Beauty is a source of advice for the young woman. Although she had an affair with R., Cynara believes she is a lesbian. Parallel to Belle Watling in Gone with the Wind.
- Garlic—Planter's manservant Garlic is the architect of his master's success, his master's marriage and the house Tata. He used his wits and patience to manipulate Planter, with the goal of becoming the estate's real master. Cynara suspects that he may also be the mastermind behind Planter's death. Parallel to Pork in Gone with the Wind.
- Lady—After the death of her cousin Filipe, her only love, Lady joined Planter in a chaste marriage. Hurt by the close relationship between Other and Mammy, she would sometimes care for and breast-feed Cynara. She kept a secret that could destroy her family: she learned that one of her distant ancestors was black, which by the one-drop rule made her and her children Negro. Parallel to Ellen O'Hara in Gone with the Wind.
- Planter—Though he doted on his daughter Cynara when she was young, he gave her away to another family when he realized that she was Other's rival. His passion was for Mammy, not for his wife. Parallel to Gerald O'Hara in Gone with the Wind.
- The Dreamy Gentleman—The unobtainable knight of Other's dreams, the Dreamy Gentleman chose to marry his plain cousin Mealy Mouth and live respectably. As a homosexual, he was horrified by Other's advances; he secretly loved Miss Priss' brother. When his lover revealed the affair to his wife, Mealy Mouth had the slave whipped to death. Parallel to Ashley Wilkes in Gone with the Wind.
- Miss Priss—Garlic's daughter holds a grudge against Mealy Mouth, whom she blames for two of her brothers' deaths. One of her brothers was whipped to death when Mealy Mouth discovered his affair with her husband. The other starved to death as a baby when his mother became wet nurse to Mealy Mouth's child. The whites believe she was psychologically broken by her brothers' deaths, but the slaves believe that she is a crafty woman who is responsible for Mealy Mouth's death. Parallel to Prissy in Gone with the Wind.
- Mealy Mouth-Other's friend and Dreamy Gentleman's wife. Parallel to Melanie Wilkes in Gone with the Wind.

== Similarity to characters in Gone with the Wind ==
The book consciously avoids using the names of Mitchell's characters or locations. Cynara refers to her sister as "Other", rather than Scarlett, and to Other's husband as "R" (and later, "Debt Chauffeur") instead of Rhett Butler. Other is in love with "Dreamy Gentleman" (Ashley Wilkes), although he is married to "Mealy Mouth" (Melanie Wilkes). The magnificence of the O'Haras' house, Tara, is reduced to "Tata" or "Cotton Farm", and Twelve Oaks is renamed for its builders, "Twelve Slaves Strong as Trees".

While this could be done for legal purposes, depriving enslaved people of their names is one way slave owners asserted their dominance and deprived the enslaved of their agency. By being the only character in the book going by their true name, Cynara asserts her agency and personal narrative.

== Legal controversy ==
The estate of Margaret Mitchell sued Randall and her publishing company, Houghton Mifflin, on the grounds that The Wind Done Gone was too similar to Gone with the Wind, thus infringing its copyright. The case attracted numerous comments from leading scholars, authors, and activists, regarding what Mitchell's attitudes would have been and how much The Wind Done Gone copies from its predecessor. After the U.S. Court of Appeals for the Eleventh Circuit vacated an injunction against publishing the book in Suntrust v. Houghton Mifflin (2001), the case was settled in 2002 when Houghton Mifflin agreed to make an unspecified donation to Morehouse College in exchange for Mitchell's estate dropping the litigation.

The cover of the book bears a seal identifying it as "The Unauthorized Parody." It is parody in the broad legal sense: a work that comments on or criticizes a prior work. This characterization was important in the Suntrust case.
