= Scarlett (miniseries) =

American TV miniseries

- Based on: Scarlett by Alexandra Ripley
- Written by: William Hanley
- Directed by: John Erman
- Starring: Joanne Whalley-Kilmer; Timothy Dalton
- Theme music composer: John Morris
- Country of origin: United States
- Original language: English
- No. of episodes: 4

Production
- Executive producer: Robert Halmi
- Producers: John Erman; Richard M. Rosenbloom; Doris Kirch
- Cinematography: Tony Imi
- Editors: Malcolm Cooke; Keith Palmer; John W. Wheeler
- Running time: 360 minutes
- Production companies: TF1; Kirch Gruppe; Silvio Berlusconi Communications; Beta Film; RHI Entertainment
- Budget: $45 million

Original release
- Network: CBS
- Release: November 13 – November 17, 1994

Scarlett is a 1994 American six-hour television miniseries loosely based on the 1991 book of the same name written by Alexandra Ripley as a sequel to Margaret Mitchell's 1936 novel Gone with the Wind. The series was filmed at 53 locations in the United States and abroad, and stars Joanne Whalley-Kilmer as Scarlett O'Hara, Timothy Dalton as Rhett Butler, and Sean Bean as Lord Richard Fenton. The miniseries was broadcast in four parts on CBS from November 13 to November 17, 1994.

== Synopsis ==
Although the television miniseries shares its name with the book sequel to Gone with the Wind, the plots between the two differ dramatically. The miniseries begins with many similarities to the book in characters, location, and plot, but it departs more and more until the plot is nearly unrecognizable near the end, including a lengthy prison arc and multiple scenes of violent rape.

The series begins with Scarlett attending the funeral of Melanie Wilkes, her late sister-in-law and rival for Ashley Wilkes' affection, at which her estranged husband, Rhett Butler, is not present. Heartbroken that he left her, Scarlett sets out for Tara and is saddened when she learns that Mammy, her mainstay since birth, is dying. When she arrives, she sends a telegram to notify Rhett about Mammy under the name of Will Benteen (her sister Suellen's husband), because she knows that Rhett won't come if he suspects she is there. Before Mammy passes away, she makes Rhett swear to look after "her lamb", Miss Scarlett. He agrees, although he has no intention of honoring the request. After Mammy dies, Rhett and Scarlett have another hostile encounter, which culminates in him leaving and her returning to the Atlanta house, determined to win him back.

=== Return to Tara ===
This section is practically identical to that of the book regarding Scarlett's actions at the funeral and Mammy's death bed.

=== Going to Charleston ===
The major differences in Charleston are in the attitude and behavior of the characters, most notably Scarlett and Anne. Scarlett is not shown struggling with her unease in society but rather is criticized when Anne sees her and Ashley go into his hotel room together, resulting in a steamy kiss. Anne is completely different from her counterpart in the novel; while she is supposed to be a clone of Melanie, she coyly flirts with Rhett and does other things that neither her character in the book nor Melanie ever would have done. The series continues to follow the relationship created between them after the book ceases doing so.

=== Savannah ===
Scarlett continues to distance herself from the novel as her relationship with her kin is not so much discovering and assimilating her Irish heritage and family, as escaping from her grandfather's household and passing the time. Her decision to go to Ireland is also preceded by cutting off all ties to America as well as the details of buying her sister Carreen's share of Tara, which had been donated to the convent as a dowry when she became a nun.

=== Ireland ===
Once in Ireland, Scarlett is faced with two main conflicts that differ from the novel. She is pursued by Lord Richard Fenton, of whom her kin disapprove. She also faces quandaries and mixed emotions over the physical force the Irish rebels use against British rule, and the way the English treated the Irish is contrasted to how the South was treated by the North.

=== Katie Colum O'Hara (Cat) ===
Scarlett keeps her daughter's birth a secret from Rhett to spite him, thinking that if Katie grows up not knowing her father she will not love him. The day that Rhett finally does meet his daughter, he will realize that she does not love him or even know him, thus giving Scarlett her revenge. Katie is barely talked about beyond this – her role in the book as the possible manifestation of a supernatural force is entirely deleted. Anne Hampton-Butler also travels to Ireland with Rhett, which never occurred in the novel, and she even has a lengthy conversation with Scarlett. Her death from yellow fever is also detailed.

=== Lord Fenton ===
Lord Fenton's character is much more evil than in the novel. He coerces a servant girl named Mary to have sex with him, becomes physically violent, repeatedly rapes her, and he also rapes Scarlett. Mary kills him in retaliation, but Scarlett is accused. The plot completely veers from the novel at this point; when Scarlett is put on trial, Rhett comes to her defense, having learned about Katie. It is also discovered that Colum, found shot dead by the road some time before, was murdered by Lord Fenton. Colum had gone to confront Fenton to ask him to provide the funds to send Mary, who was pregnant with Fenton's child, away to the United States as she wished. Colum had threatened to tell Scarlett about Lord Fenton’s true nature if he didn’t help Mary; Lord Fenton then murdered Colum and left him by the roadside at night.

When Rhett tries to ask Mary to testify to save Scarlett, Mary attempts suicide by drowning herself in the river, but is saved by Rhett. At the trial, Mary is still reluctant to confess that she killed Fenton, but does so after Scarlett is found guilty of murder. Later, Rhett and Scarlett make up with one another and decide to travel the world with Cat.

== Cast ==
Starring

- Joanne Whalley-Kilmer as Scarlett O'Hara
- Timothy Dalton as Rhett Butler

Also starring

- Barbara Barrie as Pauline Robillard, one of Scarlett's maternal aunts (ep. 1–2)
- Sean Bean as Lord Richard Fenton (ep. 2–4)
- Brian Bedford as Sir John Morland (ep. 3–4)
- Stephen Collins as Ashley Wilkes (ep. 1, 3)
- John Gielgud as Pierre Robillard, Scarlett's maternal grandfather (ep. 2)
- Annabeth Gish as Anne Hampton-Butler (ep. 1–4)
- George Grizzard as Henry Hamilton, Melanie's uncle (ep. 1–3)
- Julie Harris as Eleanor Butler, Rhett's mother (ep. 1–4)
- Melissa Leo as Suellen O'Hara Benteen (ep. 1, 3)
- Colm Meaney as Father Colum O'Hara (ep. 2–3)
- Gary Raymond as Old Daniel O'Hara (ep. 2–4)
- Esther Rolle as Mammy (ep. 1)
- Jean Smart as Sally Brewton (ep. 1–2, 4)
- Elizabeth Wilson as Eulalie Robillard, one of Scarlett's maternal aunts (ep. 1–2)
- Paul Winfield as Big Sam (ep. 1)
- Sara Crowe as Lulie Harris (ep. 1)
- Rakie Ayola as Pansy (ep. 1–3)
- Ray McKinnon as Will Benteen, husband of Scarlett's sister Suellen (ep. 1, 3)
- Pippa Guard as India Wilkes (ep. 1)
- Tina Kellegher as Mary Boyle (ep. 2–4)
- Bairbre Dowling as Mrs. Boyle (ep. 4)
- Rosaleen Linehan as Mrs. Fitzpatrick (ep. 2–4)
- Betsy Blair as Sister of Mercy (ep. 2)
- Ronald Pickup as Whitlock (ep. 4)
- Delena Kidd as Lady Morland (ep. 3–4)
- Dorothy Tutin as Lady Fenton (ep. 4)
- Peter Eyre as Roberts (ep. 4)
- Ann-Margret as Belle Watling (ep. 1–4)

== Awards and nominations ==
Year	Award	Result	Category	Recipient
1995	American Society of Cinematographers	Nominated	Outstanding Achievement in Cinematography in Mini-Series	Tony Imi
1995	Emmy Award	Nominated	Outstanding Individual Achievement in Costume Design for a Miniseries or a Special	Marit Allen (For episode 1)
1995	Emmy Award	Won	Outstanding Individual Achievement in Hairstyling for a Miniseries or a Special	Tricia Cameron and Linda De Andrea
1995	Emmy Award	Won	Outstanding Individual Achievement in Art Direction for a Miniseries or a Special	Brian Ackland-Snow, Joseph Litsch, Josie MacAvin, and Rodger Maus (For episode 1)
