= Creative works set in Charleston, South Carolina =

There have been many creative works set in Charleston, South Carolina. In addition, Charleston is a popular filming location for movies and television, both in its own right and as a stand-in for Southern and/or historic settings.

== Literature ==
- Porgy (1925), by DuBose Heyward, adapted into a play in 1927.
- Several books by Citadel alumnus and novelist Pat Conroy (d. 2016), such as The Lords of Discipline (1980) set from 1963–'67, and (based on Conroy's experiences as a cadet at The Citadel) and South of Broad (a #1 2009 New York Times Best Seller).
- British author Clive Barker's novel Galilee 1998
- Harry Turtledove's Southern Victory Series (1997-2007), an alternate history series about a Confederacy that won the Civil War
- Italian author Rafael Sabatini's novel The Carolinian
- Grace Peixotto and her bordello, the Big Brick at 11 Beresford Street in Charleston, are said to have been the inspiration for Belle Watling and her brothel in Margaret Mitchell's Gone With the Wind (1936).
- A #1 New York Times Best Seller in 1991 (and the best selling novel of 1991) Scarlett, is the sequel to Gone with the Wind. In fact, the late Alexandra Ripley, the author of Scarlett and a Charleston native, derived inspiration from the city for her novel Charleston (1981) and its sequel On Leaving Charleston.
- The novel Werewolf Smackdown by Mario Acevedo is set in Charleston.
- The novels Dreams of Sleep, Rich in Love, and The Fireman's Fair were written by Josephine Humphreys, a native of Charleston. All are set in Charleston and the Charleston area. Rich in Love (1993) was filmed on Mount Pleasant and in Charleston.
- Virals, Seizure, Code, Exposure, and Terminal (2010–15) by Kathy Reichs are set in Charleston.
- Celia Garth, a Revolutionary era novel by Gwen Bristow
- Rick Riordan's 2012 hit teen book Mark of Athena, part of the Percy Jackson/Heroes of Olympus series has several scenes set in Charleston like Fort Sumter.
- Sue Monk Kidd's 2014 novel The Invention of Wings (a #1 New York Times Best Seller). The book's story is partially situated in Charleston, the birthplace of Sarah Grimké, who also inspired the main characters of the novel.
- North and South series of books by John Jakes, was partially set in Charleston. North and South reached #1 on the New York Times Best Seller list in 1982.
- Charleston by Alexandra Ripley was set in the town.
- The Trust by Sean Keefer, a legal thriller, is set in and around Charleston.

== Film and television ==
- In the Netflix series House of Cards, the main character Congressman Frank Underwood (Kevin Spacey) is an alumnus of The Sentinel, a fictional school based on the local Citadel, and returns to its campus in one episode upon the occasion of a new library building there being named for him. 2013–present
- The Notebook, 2004, starring Rachel McAdams, Ryan Gosling, and James Garner, was filmed in Charleston. The American Theatre on King Street was Allie and Noah's first date spot. (It is set in 1940–'46 on Seabrook Island; based on the novel by North Carolina author Nicholas Sparks.)
- The 2010 film, Dear John, starring Amanda Seyfried and Channing Tatum, was filmed on Sullivans Island; set in early 2000s, it was the #1 film in U.S. [based on the novel (which was a #1 New York Times Best Seller in 2006) by North Carolina author Nicholas Sparks]
- The College of Charleston's Randolph Hall is featured in the 2000 Mel Gibson and Heath Ledger movie The Patriot. It serves as the meeting house where the South Carolinians decide to join the fight against the British. (set in 1776–1781)
- The 1989 film Glory starring Matthew Broderick, Denzel Washington, and Morgan Freeman, is about the 1863 Second Battle of Fort Wagner on Morris Island.
- The TNT television show Falling Skies is set predominately in postapocalyptic Charleston from the second season onwards.
- The Lifetime television show Army Wives (2007–2013) is set at a fictional Army post in Charleston and mostly filmed on location in the City of Charleston and in the City of North Charleston. A sound stage was built near the intersection of Dorchester Rd and Montague Ave in North Charleston and a small town at the old Naval Base in North Charleston and shot many scenes at the U.S. Air Force Base in North Charleston.
- The Bravo reality series titled Southern Charm (2014–present) follows the lives of a group of wealthy friends and socialites around Charleston, although only Thomas Ravenel is an actual Charlestonian.
- The CBS television show Reckless (2014–15) was filmed and set in Charleston.
- The WE Network television show South of Hell is filmed and takes place in Charleston.
- Gullah Gullah Island (1994–98, children's TV series) was on Nickelodeon.
- North and South miniseries was partially set and filmed in Charleston. The wedding between George Hazard and Constance Flynn was held in Stella Maris Catholic Church, on Sullivans Island.

== Opera ==
- George Gershwin's controversial folk opera Porgy and Bess (1935), based on the novel Porgy, is set in Charleston and was partially written at Folly Beach, near Charleston. A film version was released in 1959.
