= Frankly, my dear, I don't give a damn =

Iconic film quotation

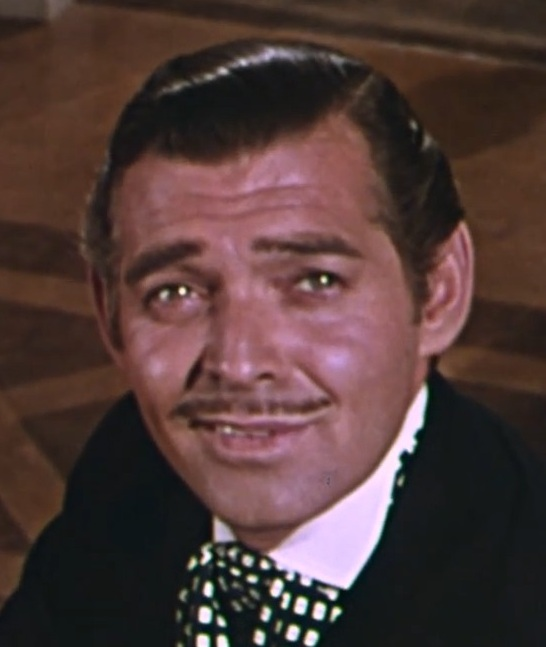
- Rhett Butler (Clark Gable)
- Character: Rhett Butler
- Actor: Clark Gable
- First used in: Gone with the Wind
- Voted #1 in AFI's 100 Movie Quotes poll

"Frankly, my dear, I don't give a damn" is a line from the 1939 film Gone with the Wind starring Clark Gable and Vivien Leigh. The line is spoken by Rhett Butler (Gable), as his last words to Scarlett O'Hara (Leigh), in response to her tearful question: "Where shall I go? What shall I do?"; Scarlett clings to the hope that she can win him back. This line is slightly different in Margaret Mitchell's 1936 novel Gone with the Wind, from which the film is derived: "My dear, I don't give a damn."

The line demonstrates that Rhett has finally given up on Scarlett and their tumultuous relationship. After more than a decade of fruitlessly seeking her love, he no longer cares what happens to her, even though she has finally admitted that she truly loves him.

== Production code conflict ==
Prior to the release of Gone With the Wind (1939), censors objected to the use of the word "damn" in the film, a word that had been prohibited by the 1930 Motion Picture Production Code, beginning in July 1934. However, before 1930 the word "damn" had been relatively common in films. In the silent era, John Gilbert even shouted "Goddamn you!" to the enemy during battle in The Big Parade (1925). The Production Code was ratified on March 31, 1930, and was effective for motion pictures whose filming began afterward. Thus, talkies that used "damn" include Glorifying the American Girl (1929), Flight (1929), Gold Diggers of Broadway (1929), Hell's Angels (1930), The Big Trail (1930), The Dawn Patrol (1930), The Green Goddess (1930), and Dracula (1931). Although legend persists that the Hays Office fined producer David O. Selznick $5,000 (equivalent to about $115,730 in 2025) for using the word "damn", in fact the MPPDA board passed an amendment to the Production Code a month and a half before the film's release, on November 1, 1939, that allowed use of the words "hell" or "damn" when their use "shall be essential and required for portrayal, in proper historical context, of any scene or dialogue based upon historical fact or folklore ... or a quotation from a literary work, provided that no such use shall be permitted which is intrinsically objectionable or offends good taste". With that amendment, the Production Code Administration had no further objection to Rhett Butler's closing line. It is actually the second use of "damn" in the film. The term "damn Yankees" is heard in the parlor scene at Twelve Oaks.

== Legacy ==
This quotation was voted the number one movie line of all time by the American Film Institute in 2005. Marlon Brando was critical of Gable's delivery of the line, commenting—in the audio recordings distributed by Listen to Me Marlon (2015)—that "When an actor takes a little too long as he's walking to the door, you know he's gonna stop and turn around and say, 'Frankly, my dear, I don't give a damn.'"
