= Ashley Wilkes =

Fictional character in Gone with the Wind

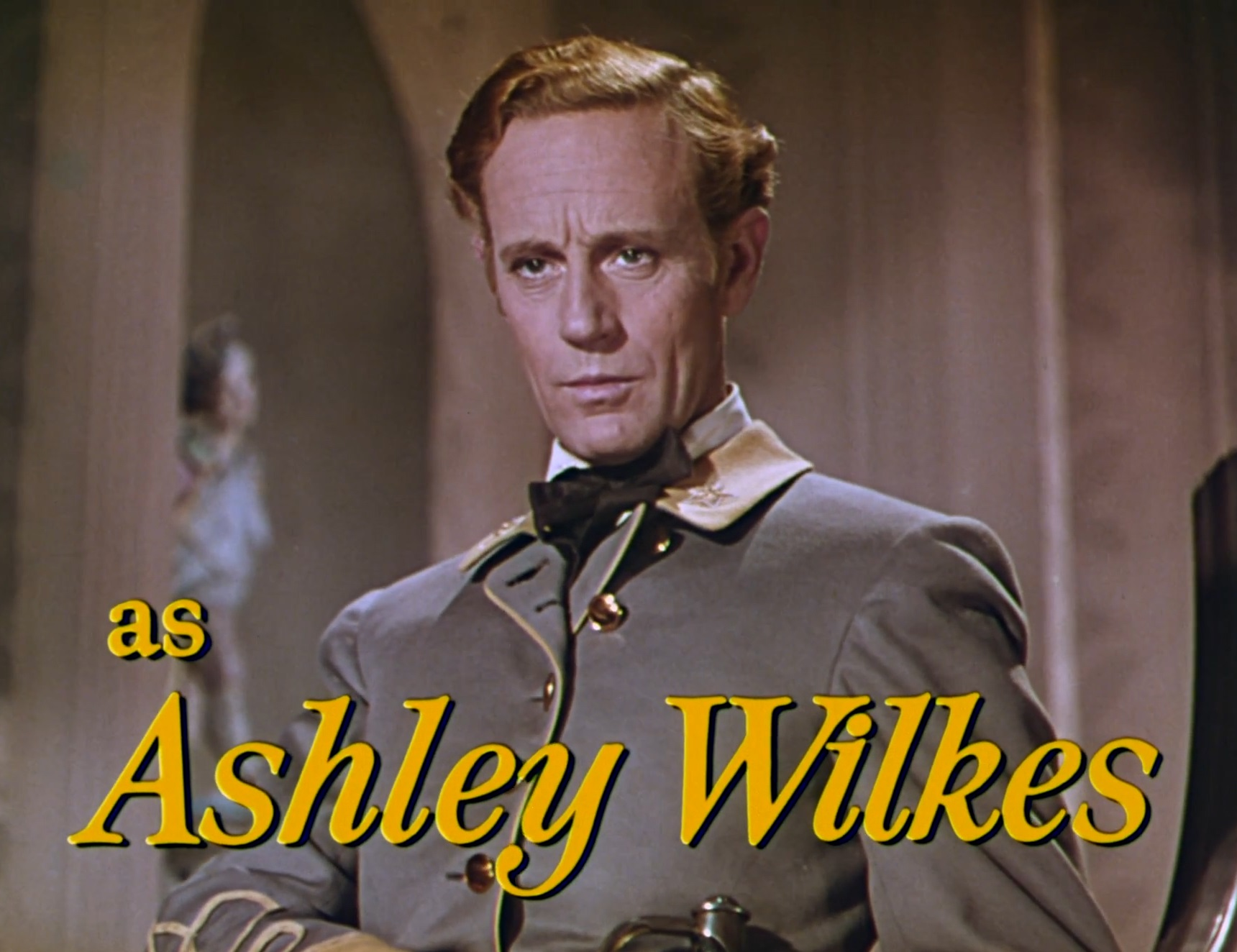
- as portrayed by Leslie Howard in Gone With the Wind
- First appearance: Gone with the Wind
- Last appearance: Rhett Butler's People
- Created by: Margaret Mitchell
- Portrayed by: Leslie Howard; Stephen Collins

In-universe information
- Gender: Male
- Occupation: Aristocrat
- Family: John Wilkes (father); India Wilkes (sister); Honey Wilkes (sister)
- Spouses: Melanie Hamilton (widowed; also cousin)
- Children: Beau Wilkes
- Relatives: Henry Hamilton (uncle); Sarah "Pittypat" Hamilton (aunt); William Hamilton (uncle); Charles Hamilton (cousin)

George Ashley Wilkes is a fictional character in Margaret Mitchell's 1936 novel Gone with the Wind and the 1939 film of the same name. The character also appears in the 1991 book Scarlett, a sequel to Gone with the Wind written by Alexandra Ripley, and in Rhett Butler's People (2007) by Donald McCaig.

== Fictional biography ==
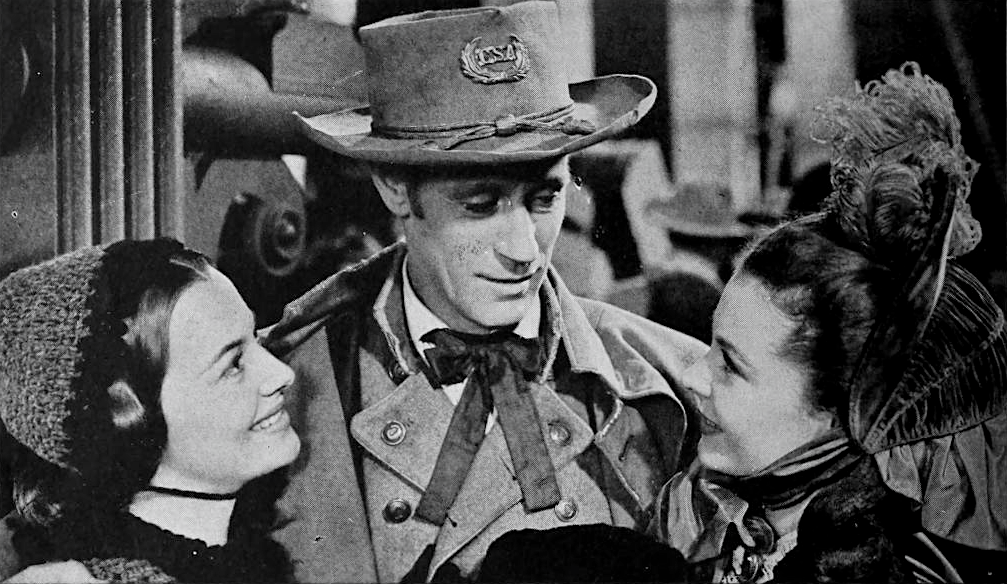
Ashley with wife Melanie Hamilton (left) and sister-in-law Scarlett O'Hara (right)

Wilkes was born in 1840, being twenty-one at the start of the novel. He is the man with whom Scarlett O'Hara is obsessed. Gentlemanly yet indecisive, he loves Scarlett but finds he has more in common with Melanie, his first cousin and later his wife. However, he is tormented by his attraction to Scarlett. Unfortunately for him and Scarlett, his failure to deal with his true feelings for her ruins any chance she has for real happiness with Rhett Butler. Wilkes is a complicated character. He is not sympathetic to the cause of the North. However, he isn't an ardent Confederate patriot, either. What he loves about the South is the serene, peaceful life that he and his dear ones know at Twelve Oaks and similar plantations. At one point after the war he comments to Scarlett that "had the war not come he would have spent his life happily buried at Twelve Oaks."

In short, Wilkes loves the South, but not necessarily the Confederacy. He hates war, telling his friends at the beginning of the book that "most of the misery in the world has been caused by war", though he fights because of his loyalty to the above-mentioned peaceful life he had in Georgia. Ashley serves as an officer in Cobb's Legion.

There is a sense in which the end of Ashley's life (as he knew it) is more than just the burning of Twelve Oaks. The four Tarleton brothers (Boyd, Tom, Brent and Stuart) are all killed, three of them at Gettysburg. Cade Calvert returns home terminally ill from tuberculosis. Little Joe Fontaine is killed in battle, and Tony Fontaine has to flee forever to Texas after killing a Yankee (specifically, Scarlett's family's former slave overseer, Jonas Wilkerson, during Reconstruction; after Wilkerson encouraged a former slave to attempt to rape Tony's sister-in-law). These were Wilkes' childhood friends, all represented in the happy scene at the barbecue, close to the beginning of the book. When the "family circle" of the county is decimated, the life he loved is gone.

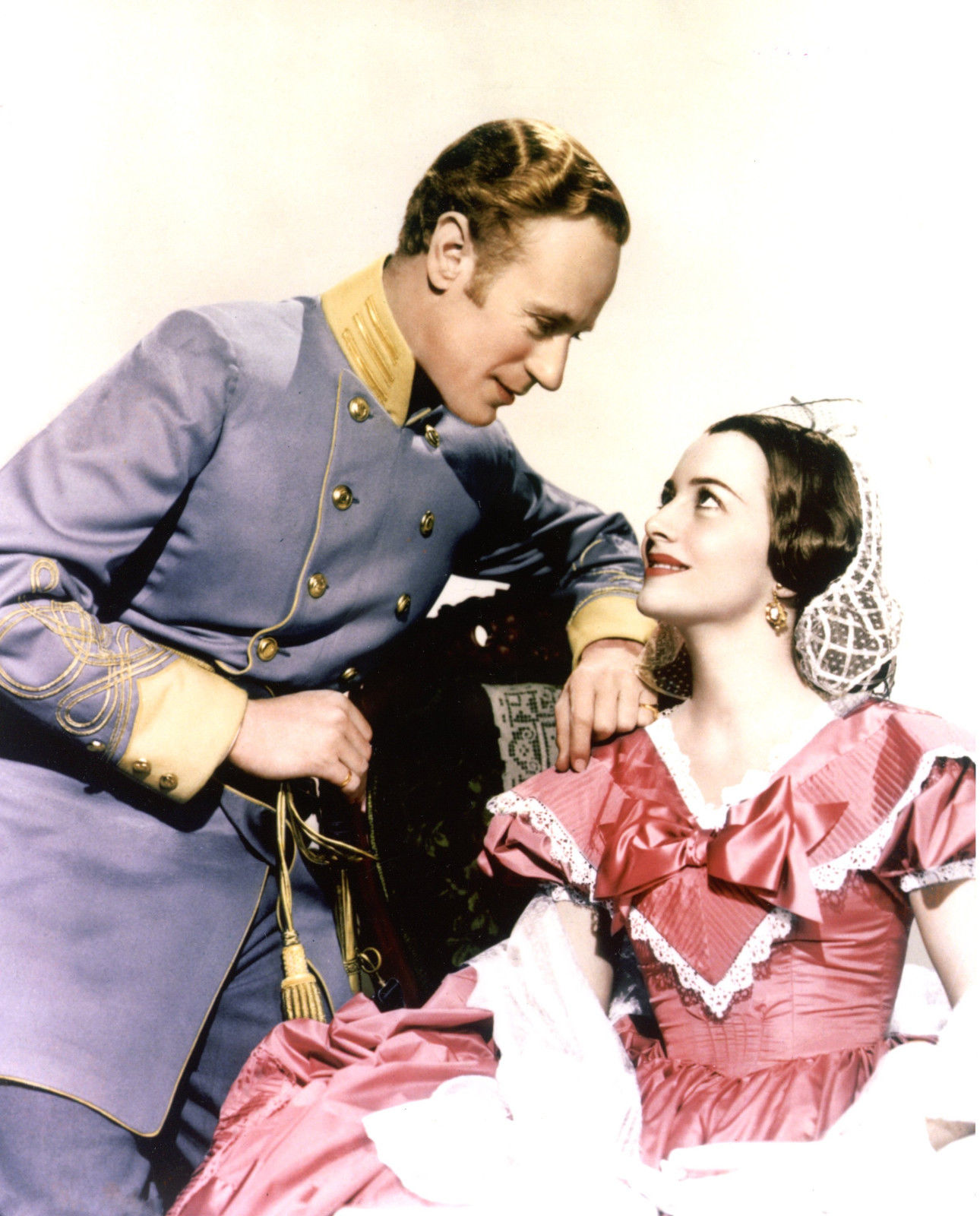
Ashley and Melanie

At one point in the book Wilkes pleads, in vain, with his wife Melanie to move to the North, after he comes back from fighting in the war. This isn't, however, because of any affection for the North, but because he wants to be able to stand on his own as a man, something he will never again be able to do in Georgia now that his plantation is gone and his home burned. However, he ends up working for Scarlett due to her manipulative entreaties and Melanie's naive support of her. Melanie also states that if they move to New York, Beau will not be able to go to school. This is because in New York he’d be surrounded by “Yankees,” and Melanie had no desire for Beau to pick up Northern ways.

== Role ==
Wilkes is the character best personifying the tragedy of the Southern upper class after the Civil War. Coming from a privileged background, he is an honorable and educated man. This is in clear contrast to Rhett Butler, who is decisive and full of life. Rhett is both ruthless and practical, and willing to do whatever he must to survive. In contrast, Wilkes is often impractical (even Melanie admits this on her deathbed) and would resist doing many things Rhett would do because they aren't "proper" or "gentlemanly". Wilkes fights in the Civil War, but he does it out of love for his homeland and not a hatred of the Yankees, who he actually hopes will just leave the South in peace. As a soldier he shows enough leadership to be promoted to the rank of Major, and survives being imprisoned at the Rock Island Arsenal in Illinois (a notorious prisoner-of-war camp) for several months. He eventually returns home, still able-bodied.

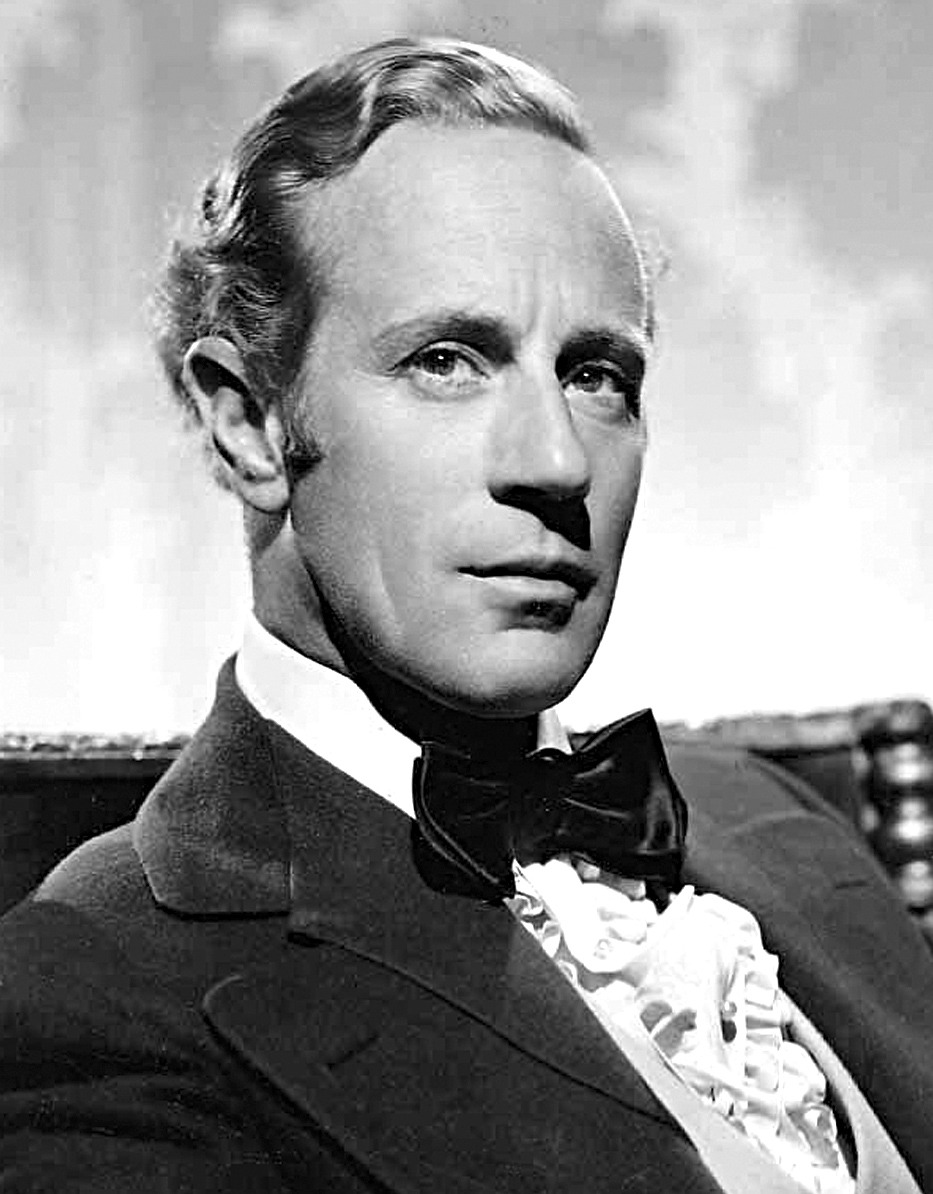
Leslie Howard as Ashley Wilkes

Ashley could have lived a peaceful and respectable life had the War never taken place. The War that changed the South forever has turned his world upside down, with everything he had believed in 'gone with the wind', a phrase composed by the poet Ernest Dowson. Doc Holliday is believed to be the inspiration behind Ashley Wilkes.

== Portrayals ==
Wilkes was portrayed by Leslie Howard in the critically acclaimed 1939 film adaption of the novel. It would become Howard's most famous role.
