= Rhett Butler's People =

Book by Donald McCaig

- The cover of the hardcover edition
- Author: Donald McCaig
- Language: English
- Genre: Historical novel, Romance
- Publisher: St. Martin's Press
- Publication date: November 2007 (hardcover)
- Publication place: United States
- Pages: 512 (hardcover)
- ISBN: 0312262515 (hardcover)
- Preceded by: Gone with the Wind

Rhett Butler's People by Donald McCaig is an authorized sequel to the 1936 novel Gone with the Wind. It was published in November 2007.

Fully authorized by the Margaret Mitchell estate, Rhett Butler’s People is a novel that parallels Gone with the Wind from Rhett Butler's perspective. The book was unveiled on November 3, 2007, after several years of setbacks and two previous authors. Both Emma Tennant and Pat Conroy had previously been commissioned by the estate to produce the book.

McCaig chose to disregard the 1991 novel Scarlett by Alexandra Ripley. He does not acknowledge its existence in the canon of Gone with the Wind, nor does his novel incorporate any of its characters. McCaig's impression was that the Margaret Mitchell estate was "thoroughly embarrassed" by Ripley's novel.

== Plot ==
Rhett Butler's People attempts to present a semi-journalistic view of the life and times of Rhett Butler, while remaining faithful to the original Mitchell work. The Rhett-Scarlett love-story is downplayed. The novel begins with a duel that is mentioned in Gone with the Wind; this is the reason that Rhett is not received in Charleston society. He participates in a duel against Belle Watling's brother, who is certain that Rhett is the father of his sister's unborn child.

Eventually the novel flashes back to when Rhett was twelve years old. He never had a good relationship with his father, Langston Butler, and often refused to go to Charleston with his father. His father often punished Rhett due to his lack of cooperative skills as his eldest son. Instead, Rhett spends time in the slaves quarters where he enjoys his time with Will (a slave). One day, Will gets firmly punished due to disobedience towards a white overseer. Rhett, unable to see his friend getting whipped continuously and having no power to stop it, takes the boat to escape the chaos, and vows to grow up and never be helpless again.

The novel continues through the time covered by Gone with the Wind and retells the story. The story is not told solely from Rhett's perspective. It proceeds to relate other moments from the time during the original novel and then adds a new ending. The book only goes a short way past the timeline of Gone with the Wind (unlike the sequel Scarlett, which travels several years further).

== Reception ==
Melissa Whitworth of The Daily Telegraph described McCaig's Butler as "touchy-feely". In The New York Times, Stephen Carter noted that the character of Rhett Butler was made into a more human, flawed person than either Mitchell or Ripley portrayed him to be. However, he stated that the novel transformed Rhett from the man of mystery that drew readers to him into "a version of the angst-ridden, on-the-make, love-struck antihero of modern fiction: Rhett Butler as channeled by Rabbit Angstrom [of Rabbit, Run] or T. S. Garp [of The World According to Garp]." He then wondered if such a Rhett was one wanted by readers. Alison Flood of The Guardian said that in Mitchell's novel, the character of Mammy – which won actor Hattie McDaniel an Oscar in the film version of the book – is not fleshed out.
