= Scarlett (Ripley novel) =

1991 novel by Alexandra Ripley

- German cover
- Author: Alexandra Ripley
- Language: English
- Genre: Historical, Romance, Novel
- Publisher: Warner Books
- Publication date: September 1991
- Publication place: United States
- Media type: Print (Hardback & Paperback)
- Pages: 823
- ISBN: 0-446-51507-8 (first edition, hardback)
- OCLC: 23870219
- Dewey Decimal: 813/.54 20
- LC Class: PS3568.I597 S27 1991

Scarlett is a 1991 novel by Alexandra Ripley, written as a sequel to Margaret Mitchell's 1936 novel, Gone with the Wind. The book debuted on The New York Times Best Seller list.

It was adapted as a television mini-series of the same title in 1994 starring Timothy Dalton as Rhett Butler and Joanne Whalley-Kilmer as Scarlett O'Hara.

== Plot summary ==
Shortly after the first novel, Scarlett attends the funeral of her former sister-in-law and rival for Ashley Wilkes' affection, Melanie Wilkes. Her estranged husband, Rhett Butler, is not present. Scarlett, heartbroken and aggravated over Rhett leaving her, sets out for Tara. There, she learns that Mammy, her mainstay since birth, is dying. She notifies Rhett about Mammy, using her brother-in-law Will Benteen's name, knowing Rhett will not come if Scarlett is there. Before Mammy dies, she makes Rhett swear to look after Scarlett. Rhett agrees, although he has no intention of honoring the request. After Mammy's death, Rhett and Scarlett fight, which culminates in Rhett leaving and Scarlett returning to the Atlanta house, determined to win Rhett back.

Scarlett travels to Charleston to visit Rhett's family and tries to corner him by winning his mother's affection. She convinces Rhett to take her for a sail on the harbor, where their boat capsizes during a terrible storm. Scarlett and Rhett swim to an island, where they make love in a cave. Rhett initially denies, then admits, that he loves Scarlett, but he does not want to "lose himself" over her again. Back in Charleston, Rhett leaves Scarlett near death at his mother's house, telling her, in a letter, that while he admires her bravery, he will never see her again.

After Scarlett regains her strength, she leaves Charleston with her two aunts, Pauline and Eulalie, to attend her maternal grandfather's birthday celebration in Savannah. She leaves a note for Rhett's mother with his sister, Rosemary, who burns it.

Scarlett connects with the Savannah O'Haras against her maternal family's wishes. Scarlett's maternal grandfather offers Scarlett his inheritance if she remains with him in Savannah until his death and avoids contact with her father's side of the family. Scarlett refuses and storms out. She stays with her cousin Jamie and his family. Soon another cousin named Colum, a priest from Ireland, joins them. Scarlett agrees to travel to Ireland with him. By this time Scarlett has realized that she is pregnant with Rhett's child but keeps her pregnancy hidden.

In Ireland, Scarlett's Irish kin welcome her. Exploring with Colum, they pass an old house called 'Ballyhara'; it was O'Hara land long before the English seized it. Scarlett soon receives a notification of divorce from Rhett. She makes plans to leave for America but learns that Rhett is now married to Anne Hampton, who is said to resemble Melanie Wilkes. Heartbroken, Scarlett decides to remain in Ireland. She works with lawyers and leaves her share of her father's plantation to her son Wade Hampton (fathered by her first husband, Charles Hamilton, brother of Melanie Wilkes), buys Ballyhara and settles down in Ireland, to her Irish family's delight. She and Colum lie, telling everyone that her husband died..

As Ballyhara is restored, Scarlett eagerly awaits the birth of her child, praying for a girl and vowing to be a good mother. She is well respected by the townspeople and her family, earning her a reputation as a hard worker. She becomes known as The O'Hara, a title reserved for the undisputed leader of a family clan.

On Halloween night, her water breaks. Her housekeeper, Mrs. Fitzpatrick, and the midwife whom Colum summons, are unable to handle the situation, and it appears that Scarlett will die. Instead, she is saved by a wise old woman who lives near the haunted tower. The caesarean birth is successful, but Scarlett can no longer have children. A girl is born with dark skin like Rhett's, but with blue eyes that slowly turn green. Scarlett names her Katie Colum O'Hara, and calls her "Cat" because of her green eyes.

Ashley Wilkes—her past lover, whom she wished to marry during her youth—proposes to Scarlett. She is grateful but kindly declines. He and Scarlett decide to remain friends.

After Scarlett settles in Ballyhara, she runs into Rhett several times—in America while she is on the boat to Boston, at a fair where she admits she still loves him, and at a foxhunt a week later. He still does not know he has a child. When he seeks her out at a society ball, Scarlett realizes he still loves her.

Lord Fenton, one of the wealthiest men in Europe, pursues Scarlett, wanting to marry her. He wants Scarlett to bear his children after seeing Cat's fiery spirit and fearlessness. He also plans to unite their estates; he owns Adamstown, the land adjacent to Scarlett's. Angered by his arrogance, Scarlett refuses and orders him to leave. Scarlett departs for Dublin for her yearly visit for parties and hunts. She later decides to accept Lord Fenton when she hears that Anne is pregnant with Rhett's child.

When news leaks out about her engagement, a drunken Rhett insults her when they meet at a horse race. A friend tells Scarlett that Anne and her baby died. Scarlett rushes back to Ballyhara hopeful that Rhett will come there. She finds the English there with an arrest warrant for Colum, who heads an Irish terrorist group. Colum is murdered and Rosaleen Fitzpatrick sets fire to the English arsenal to avenge him. The villagers, thinking Scarlett is aiding the English, set her house on fire. Rhett arrives and wants her to escape with him, but Scarlett frantically searches for Cat. She tells Rhett that he is Cat's father, and he searches for her. After finding Cat, the three climb into a high tower on Ballyhara and spend the night there. Rhett and Scarlett confess their love for one another. The next morning, they are ready to leave Ireland and start their new lives together.

== Reception ==
Scarlett was panned by critics. Reviewing the novel for The New York Times in 1991, Janet Maslin said the book was a "stunningly uneventful 823-page holding action." Donald McCaig, author of Rhett Butler's People, said it was his impression that the Margaret Mitchell estate was "thoroughly embarrassed" by Scarlett. Despite this, the novel was a commercial success; Scarlett sold millions of copies and as of 2007 remains in print.

When discussing the possibility of his own works receiving authorized sequels after his death, A Song of Ice and Fire author George R. R. Martin called such books "abominations, to my mind, like [...] Scarlett, the [...] Gone With the Wind sequel".

== TV adaptation ==
It was adapted as a television mini-series of the same title in 1994 starring Timothy Dalton as Rhett Butler and Joanne Whalley-Kilmer as Scarlett O'Hara. The plot of the mini-series varies considerably from the book.
