= Rhett Butler =

Fictional character from Gone with the Wind

- Gone with the Wind character
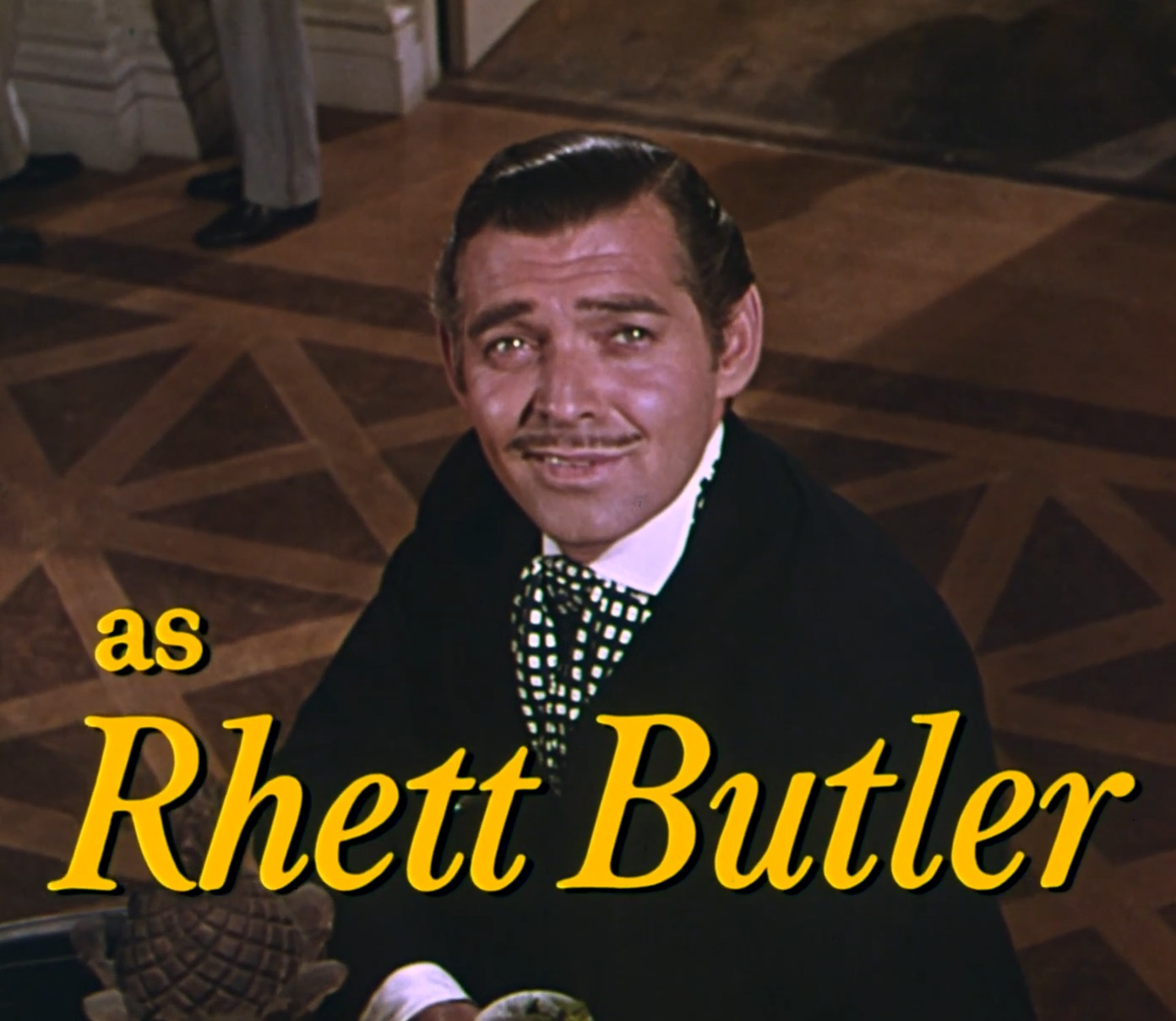
- as portrayed by Clark Gable in Gone With the Wind
- First appearance: Gone with the Wind
- Last appearance: Rhett Butler's People
- Created by: Margaret Mitchell
- Portrayed by: Clark Gable; Timothy Dalton

In-universe information
- Gender: Male
- Occupation: Blockade runner (discharged); Socialite; Planter; Confederate Soldier
- Family: Steven Butler (father); Eleanor Butler (mother); Ross Butler (brother); Rosemary Butler (sister)
- Spouses: Scarlett O'Hara (divorced; remarried); Anne Hampton (widowed)
- Children: Eugenie "Bonnie Blue" Butler; Katie "Cat" Butler; Wade Hampton Hampton (stepson); Ella Lorena Kennedy (stepdaughter)

Rhett Butler (born 1828) is a fictional character in the 1936 novel Gone with the Wind by Margaret Mitchell and in the 1939 film adaptation of the same name. Rhett is a complex character with many complex relationships throughout the novel and movie. He is known as both a scoundrel and a gambler, and he is considerably wealthy. Rhett Butler acts as a supporting character to the main character, Scarlett O'Hara, with whom he has numerous encounters. Scarlett holds a negative impression of Rhett upon their first meeting. Over the course of the story, he slowly earns her favor, and the two eventually wed. However, their conflicting personalities, a scandal, and the death of their daughter results in a doomed marriage.

The producer of the movie, David O. Selznick, went through different negotiations to borrow an actor from another studio for the role of Rhett Butler. Many other actors were considered for the part, but quite a few of them turned it down. A deal between Metro-Goldwyn-Mayer (MGM) and Selznick landed Clark Gable the role. The role of Rhett Butler is one of Clark Gable's most recognizable and significant roles.

Several sequels to Gone with the Wind bring the character back, including the miniseries Scarlett, based on the novel of the same name by Alexandra Ripley, as well as Rhett Butler's People, a novel written by Donald McCaig. In addition to those two, a novel by Alice Randall, The Wind Done Gone, is an alternative account of the story from the perspective of a slave. Several musical adaptations also bring other portrayals of Rhett Butler, adding to the depth of the character.

== Role ==
Rhett's personality is that of a cynical, charming, and mocking philanderer. He frequently declares that he has no honor, though he respects those he considers true gentlemen or ladies. He often thinks the worst of Scarlett, even as he admires and loves her. During their first meeting, he says she is no lady, just as he is no gentleman. He often mocks her attempts to be gentle, kind, or ladylike, believing it does not suit her, and encourages her scheming ways, even as he despises them. He presents a fickle and dapper front, saying things he doesn't mean and causing Scarlett to misunderstand him. His constant, defensive teasing causes her to distrust his true intentions, even when she manages to perceive them. In turn, he does not recognize that Scarlett uses charm and acid to protect herself, rather than out of malicious intent.

As the novel begins, Rhett is first mentioned at the Twelve Oaks Plantation barbecue, the home of John Wilkes and his son Ashley and daughters Honey and India Wilkes. The novel describes Rhett as "a visitor from Charleston", a black sheep who was expelled from West Point and is not received by any family with a reputation in the whole of Charleston, and perhaps all of South Carolina. He is considerably older than the 16-year-old Scarlett, being about 32-33 at the time, and has made a name for himself as a wealthy scoundrel and professional gambler. Rhett witnesses Scarlett's young confession to Ashley at the plantation barbecue and is immediately attracted to her boldness in breaking social conventions and her beauty. Rhett mocks Scarlett over her confession, which causes a lasting negative impression.

After Scarlett is widowed for the first time, Rhett makes significant headway in gaining her favor by showering a depressed and isolated-in-mourning Scarlett with attention, though he tells her he isn't going to marry her and keeps her flirtatious advances at arm's length. She requests that he help her return to Tara with her family in order to wait out the war. However, partway on the dangerous journey, his convoluted convictions lead him to give her a kiss and a gun before he abandons her on the road in order to enlist in the doomed American Civil War. Following, Scarlett undergoes one of the most significant and traumatizing times in her life without support, facing starvation, disease, and violence as she becomes the sole support for her family.

During the war, Rhett's wealth and influence balloon as he acts as a smuggler and blockade runner, often in and out of prison. Southern society marks him as an outsider, though they are occasionally charmed by him. An impoverished and desperate Scarlett seeks him out to request a loan of $300 (equivalent to $6176 in 2025) to save Tara, and after leading her in circles to see how much she'd be willing to debase herself for the funds, including her offering to be his mistress (to which he replies she wouldn't be worth that much) reveals he was never going to lend her the money, lacking sufficient liquid assets. Scarlett is furious and humiliated. In response, Scarlett convinces Frank Kennedy, her sister Suellen's beau, to marry her instead in order to save her family, since her sister intended to abandon the family and enjoy Frank's wealth.

Rhett is upset, since he actually was going to lend her the money once out of prison, and later praises her scheming and ability to steal her newest husband from under her sister's nose. During this time, Rhett admires that Scarlett makes ventures as a businesswoman, running and expanding Frank's businesses, but deplores her hard-nosed and miserly tactics, which earn her few fans, and does not understand her all-consuming need to hoard money.

Her unladylike and brutal business behavior causes Scarlett to be attacked in shanty town, and when her husband, Frank, dies during a retaliatory Ku Klux Klan raid, Rhett saves Ashley Wilkes and several others by alibiing them to the Yankee captain, a man with whom he has played cards on several occasions. Though he blames her for the death of her husband, Rhett laughs at Scarlett's sincere fears that she's going to hell for her role in Frank's life and death, and proposes to the newly widowed Scarlett, saying he always knew he'd have her, one way or another, and she should marry him for fun and their physical compatibility.

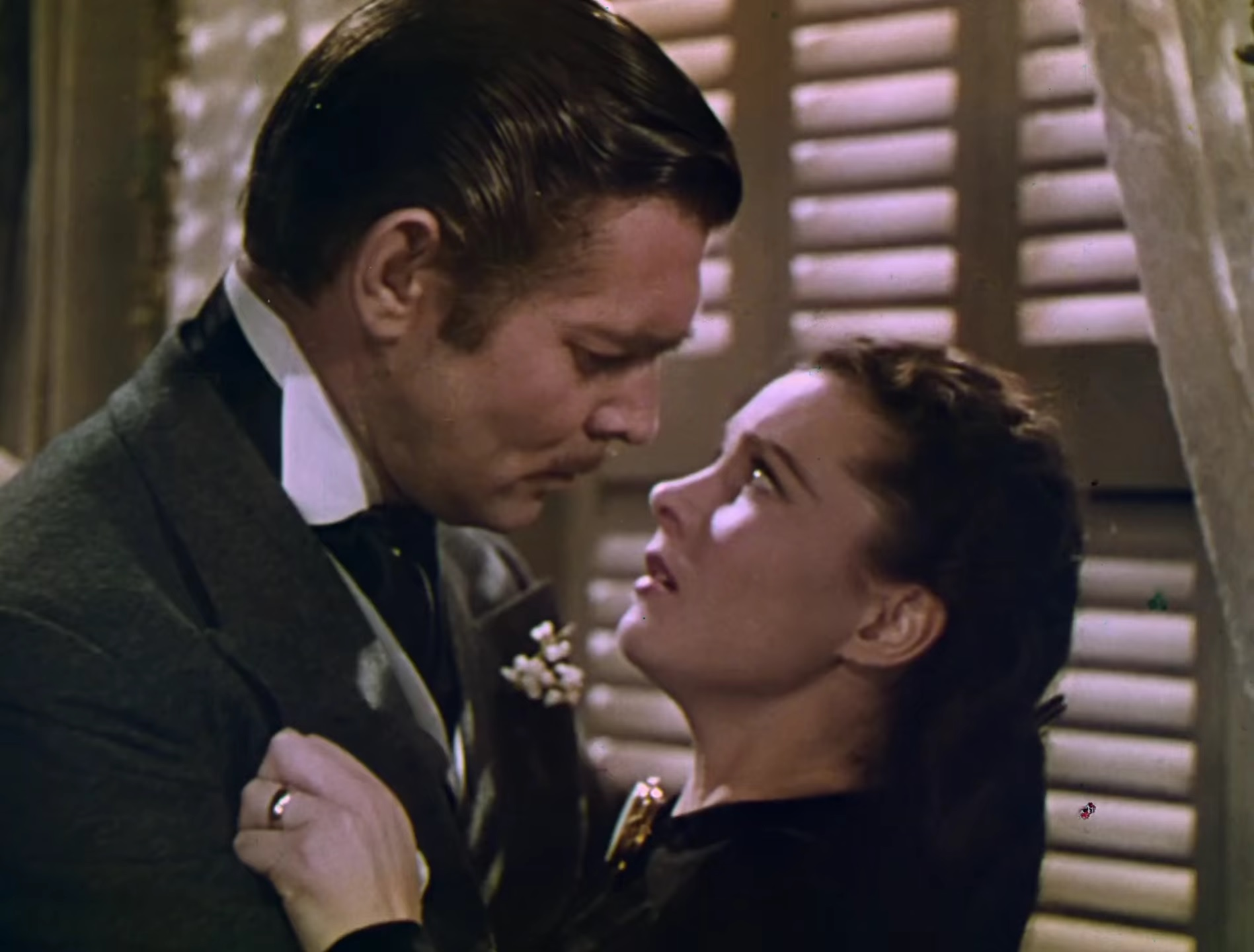
Rhett with his future wife, Scarlett O'Hara

Scarlett agrees, though only for his money. In the novel, Rhett's fortune is estimated at $50,000,000 (equivalent to $1029 million in 2025). Rhett secretly hopes that Scarlett will eventually return the love he's had since the day he saw her at Twelve Oaks. But Rhett is also determined not to show Scarlett he loves her, believing those who love Scarlett become wretched, and the pair have volcanic arguments from the start of their marriage.

Rhett's jealousy over Scarlett's continuing affection for Ashley Wilkes becomes a problem for the couple, however, as well as their low opinions of each other. Scarlett does not view Rhett as a gentleman or good person and resents that he does not see her as a lady. She does not believe or trust that he loves her and often uses her idealized infatuation with the gentlemanly Ashley Wilkes to comfort herself from the worldly, and frequently flippant, Rhett. Rhett views her money-grubbiness as tacky, loathes the position Ashley continues to play in her heart, and is unable to sway her hardened affections with his sardonic teasing. Still, Rhett completely adores their daughter, Bonnie. Rhett is an infatuated and doting father, showering his daughter with the affection Scarlett will not accept from him, which further isolates him from his wife.

In contrast with his wife, Rhett forms a genuinely warm and fond friendship with Melanie Wilkes, Ashley Wilke's wife, and Scarlett's only friend, whom he considers a rare, true 'lady', and often performs acts of service for her and relies on her for consolation. He also continues his shadier associations, much to Scarlett's displeasure and suspicion.

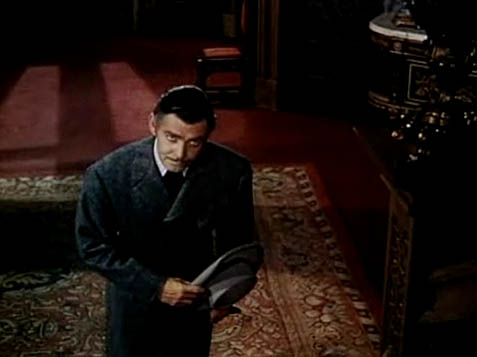
Rhett at home

The Butlers' marriage becomes tattered and eventually wrecked by scandal, the death of their daughter, an accident where Rhett causes Scarlett to tumble down the stairs and miscarry, and the final nail in the coffin, the death of Melanie, Ashley's wife. Melanie makes Scarlett promise to care for Ashley after she's gone and speaks of how much Rhett loves Scarlett. Rhett, believing Scarlett has never loved him and will jump at the chance to marry the now free and receptive Ashley, becomes apathetic to Scarlett's declarations to the contrary. Tired of it all, Rhett walks out of his marriage, seeking to abandon everything to find something left of "charm and grace" in the world.

== Character ==
In the course of the novel, Rhett becomes increasingly enamored with Scarlett's sheer will to survive in the chaos surrounding the war. The novel contains several pieces of information about him that do not appear in the film. After being disowned by his family (mainly by his father), he became a professional gambler, and at one point was involved in the California Gold Rush, where he ended up getting a scar on his stomach in a knife fight. He seems to love his mother and his sister Rosemary, but has an adversarial relationship with his father which is never resolved. He also has a younger brother who is never named, and a sister-in-law (both of whom he has little respect or regard for), who owns a rice plantation. Rhett is the guardian of a little boy who attends boarding school in New Orleans; it is speculated among readers that this boy is Belle Watling's son (whom Belle mentions briefly to Melanie), and perhaps Rhett's illegitimate son as well.

Despite being thrown out of West Point, the Rhett of the novel is obviously very well-educated, referencing everything from Shakespeare to classical history to German philosophy. He also has an extensive knowledge of women, both physically and psychologically, which Scarlett does not consider to be "decent" (but nonetheless considers fascinating). Rhett has tremendous respect and gradually gains affection for Melanie as a friend, but very little for Ashley. Rhett's understanding of human nature extends to children as well, and he is a much better parent to Scarlett's children from her previous marriages than she is herself; he has a particular affinity with her son Wade, even before Wade is his stepson. When Bonnie is born Rhett showers her with the attention that Scarlett will no longer allow him to give to her and is a devoted, even doting and overindulgent, father.

Rhett also decides to join in the Confederate Army but only after its defeat at Atlanta, and when he understood the cause to be lost. Rhett has known and believed, and has said publicly, that the South is doomed to lose. He has risked neither his life nor his fortune for the cause of the South, when to have done so at the beginning of the war might have been worth the risk to establish a new nation.

In both of the official sequels, Scarlett (1991) by Alexandra Ripley and Rhett Butler's People (2007) by Donald McCaig, and in the unofficial Winds of Tara by Kate Pinotti, Scarlett succeeds in getting Rhett back.

== Family ==
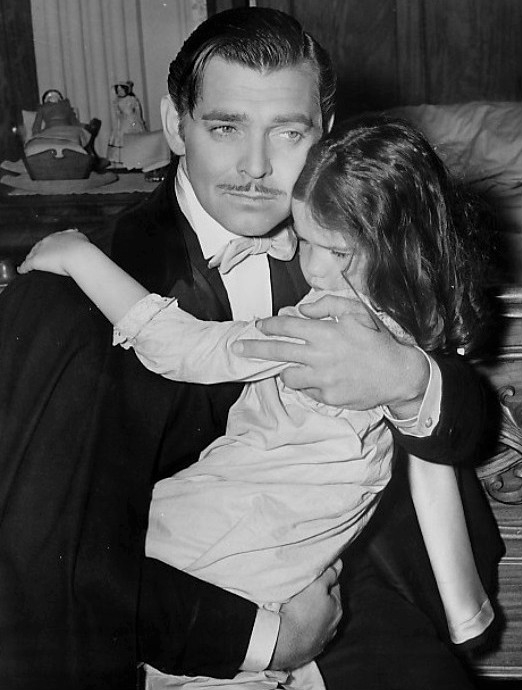
Rhett with Bonnie, his daughter with Scarlett

Rhett is the eldest child. In Gone with the Wind only his younger sister Rosemary is named; his brother and sister-in-law are mentioned very briefly, but not by name. In the sequel Scarlett by Alexandra Ripley, the Butler parents are called Steven and Eleanor, the younger brother is Ross. In this sequel Rhett marries Anne Hampton after divorcing Scarlett and he reunites with Scarlett only after Anne dies. He and Scarlett have a second daughter called Katie "Cat".

In the authorized prequel and sequel Rhett Butler's People his parents are called Langston and Elizabeth, his brother is Julian. In this novel Belle Watling's son plays an important role; in the end he is revealed to be another man's son even though he believed Rhett was his father.

== Searching for Rhett ==
In the 1939 film version of Gone with the Wind, for the role of Rhett Butler, Clark Gable was an almost immediate favorite for both the public and producer David O. Selznick (except for Gable himself). But as Selznick had no male stars under long-term contract, he needed to go through the process of negotiating to borrow an actor from another studio. Gary Cooper was thus Selznick's first choice, because Cooper's contract with Samuel Goldwyn involved a common distribution company, United Artists, with which Selznick had an eight-picture deal. However, Goldwyn remained noncommittal in negotiations.

Warner Bros. offered a package of Bette Davis, Errol Flynn, and Olivia de Havilland for the lead roles in return for the distribution rights. When Gary Cooper turned down the role of Rhett Butler, he was passionately against it. He was quoted saying, "Gone With The Wind is going to be the biggest flop in Hollywood history. I’m glad it’ll be Clark Gable who’s falling flat on his nose, not Gary Cooper". But by then Selznick was determined to get Clark Gable, and eventually found a way to borrow him from Metro-Goldwyn-Mayer. Selznick's father-in-law, MGM chief Louis B. Mayer, offered in May 1938 to fund half of the movie's budget in return for a powerful package: 50% of the profits would go to MGM, the movie's distribution would be credited to MGM's parent company, Loew's, Inc., and Loew's would receive 15 percent of the movie's gross income.

Selznick accepted this offer in August, and Gable was cast. But the arrangement to release through MGM meant delaying the start of production until Selznick International completed its eight-picture contract with United Artists. Gable was reluctant to play the role. At the time, he was wary of potentially disappointing a public who had formed a clear impression of the character that he might not necessarily convey in his performance.

== Adaptations and sequels ==
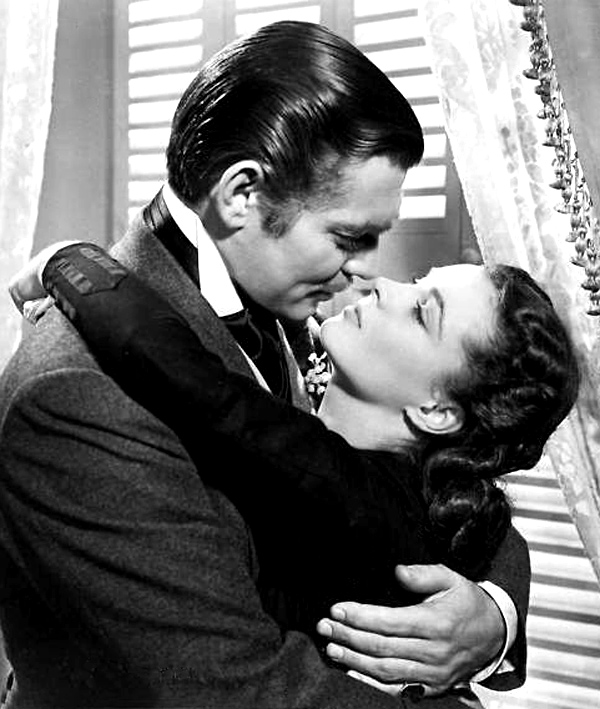
Clark Gable as Rhett in the 1939 film adaption (shown with Vivien Leigh as Scarlett O'Hara)

In the 1939 film adaptation, Rhett was played by Clark Gable. Despite his initial reservations about playing the role, Gable ultimately enjoyed playing the part. His performance is critically acclaimed (as is the film) and is considered the definitive portrayal of the character and he was nominated for Best Actor.

In Scarlett, (based on the above sequel novel), Rhett was played by Timothy Dalton.

In the musical production by Takarazuka Revue, Rhett had been played by several top stars of the group, including Yūki Amami (currently a film/TV actress), Yu Todoroki (currently one of the directors of the group) and Yōka Wao (former leading male role of the Cosmos Troupe that retired from the group in July 2006).

Alice Randall's novel, The Wind Done Gone is either a parallel historical novel, or (after litigation) a parody. It is told from the slave point of view.

Donald McCaig's novel, Rhett Butler's People is told from Rhett Butler's perspective.

In the 2008 Margaret Martin musical Gone with the Wind, the role of Rhett Butler was originated by Darius Danesh.

== Reception ==
Michael Sragow of Entertainment Weekly compared Butler to James Bond, arguing that both characters share an analytical sense, are good at seducing "ambivalent" women, and are "masters of maneuvering behind enemy lines". He also stated that "007's erotic quips follow straight from Rhett's verbal jousts with Scarlett."
