= Adam's Task =

1986 book by Vicki Hearne

Adam's Task: Calling Animals by Name
- Author: Vicki Hearne
- Publisher: Knopf
- Publication date: 1986
- ISBN: 9780394542140

Adam's Task: Calling Animals by Name by philosopher, poet, and animal trainer Vicki Hearne describes a metaphysical approach to training animals. In it, Hearne asserts that animals (specifically those that commonly cohabit or interact with humans) are more intelligent than assumed on average. She further asserts that they are capable of developing an understanding of "the good", a moral code that influences their motives and actions.

Adam's Task was first published by Knopf in 1986. It is now available from Skyhorse Publishing with a new introduction by Donald McCaig.
