= Vicki Hearne =

American poet

Victoria Elizabeth "Vicki" Hearne (February 13, 1946 – August 21, 2001) was an American author, philosopher, poet, animal trainer, and scholar of literary criticism and linguistics.

== Biography ==
Hearne was born in Austin, Texas, but, because her father was an Air Force Officer, her childhood was spent in a number of Air Force Bases. The last, where her father retired, was in Riverside, California, where she attended the University of California. There, Hearne received her B.A. in English. She subsequently spent more than twenty-five years studying animal behavior as a horse and dog trainer. Central to Hearne's view on animal training was her belief that animals should not be defined by behaviorists' dictates, that in their individuality they have the capacity to be in reciprocal relationships with humans both emotionally and morally. In addition to her poetry, she authored several books on animals and animal-training theory, including Adam's Task, Bandit, and Animal Happiness. She received a 1992 award for outstanding literary achievement from the American Academy of Arts and Letters.

In the mid-1980s, she was offered an appointment at Yale, inducing a move from California to Connecticut. Eventually, she settled in Westbrook, Connecticut. While in Connecticut, she appeared in the Oscar-nominated short documentary, A Little Vicious.

Before her passing, she authored numerous notable works, including News from the Dogs, Young Dog, Grass and More, and Trained Man and Dog.

She died at the age of 55 of lung cancer at the Connecticut Hospice in Branford, attended by her daughter Colleen Lehrman from a previous marriage, her husband Robert Tragesser and her brother, James Hearne. She was in addition survived by her father, William Victor Hearne.

== Sources ==
- Hafrey, Leigh (June 26, 1988). "You Can't Lie to a Dog—THE WHITE GERMAN SHEPHERD. By Vicki Hearne". The New York Times.
- Boxer, Sarah (December 15, 1991). "Who You Calling a Pit Bull?". The New York Times.
- Verongos, Helen (August 27, 2001). "Vicki Hearne, Who Saw Human Traits in Pets, Dies at 55". The New York Times.
