= Scarlett O'Hara =

Fictional character in Gone with the Wind

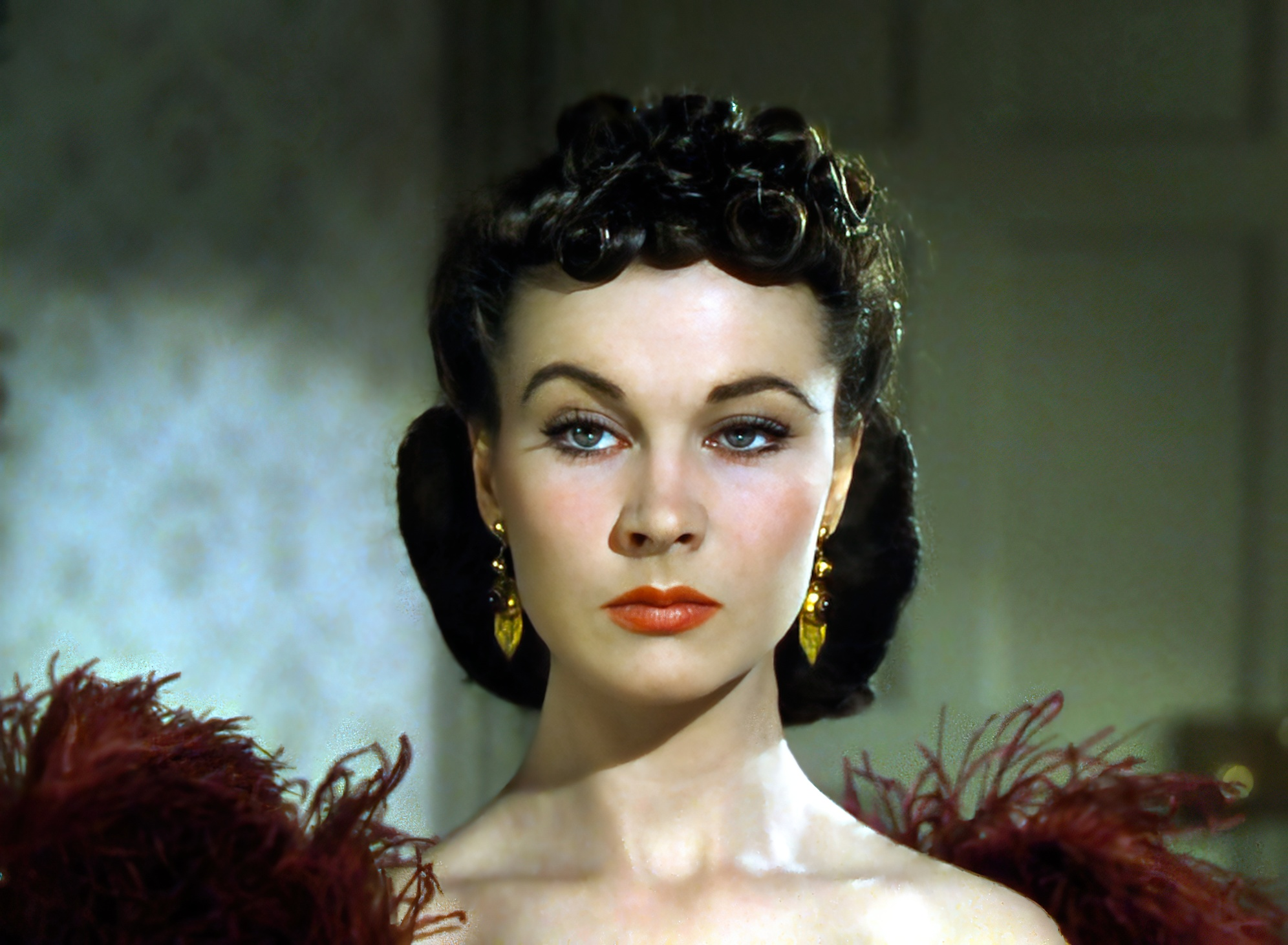
- as portrayed by Vivien Leigh in Gone With the Wind
- First appearance: Gone with the Wind
- Created by: Margaret Mitchell
- Portrayed by: Vivien Leigh (Gone with the Wind); Joanne Whalley (Scarlett)

In-universe information
- Full name: Katie Scarlett O'Hara Hamilton Kennedy Butler
- Gender: Female
- Family: Gerald O'Hara (father); Ellen O'Hara (mother); Suellen Benteen (sister); Carreen O'Hara (sister); Gerald O'Hara Jr (three younger brothers)
- Spouses: Charles Hamilton (widowed); Frank Kennedy (widowed); Rhett Butler (separated)
- Children: Wade Hampton Hamilton; Ella Lorena Kennedy; Eugenie "Bonnie Blue" Butler; Katie "Cat" Butler
- Relatives: Katie O'Hara (grandmother); Andrew O'Hara (uncle); James O'Hara (uncle); Pierre Robillard (grandfather); Solange Robillard (grandmother); Eulalie Smith (aunt); Pauline Robillard (aunt); Susie Benteen (niece)
- Religion: Catholic Church
- Nationality: French/Irish-American

Katie Scarlett O'Hara is the protagonist of Margaret Mitchell's 1936 novel Gone with the Wind and the 1939 film of the same name, in which she is portrayed by Vivien Leigh. She also is the main character in the 1970 musical Scarlett and the 1991 book Scarlett, a sequel to Gone with the Wind that was written by Alexandra Ripley and adapted for a television mini-series in 1994. During early drafts of the original novel, Mitchell referred to her heroine as "Pansy", and did not decide on the name "Scarlett" until just before the novel went to print. PBS has called O'Hara "quite possibly the most famous female character in American history."

== Biography ==
Scarlett O'Hara is the oldest living child of Gerald O'Hara and Ellen O'Hara (née Robillard). She was born in 1845 on her family's plantation Tara in Georgia. She was named Katie Scarlett, after her father's mother, but is always called Scarlett, except by her father, who refers to her as "Katie Scarlett". She is from a Catholic family of Irish ancestry on her paternal side and French ancestry on her maternal side, descending from her mother's old-money Robillard family in Savannah. Scarlett has black hair, green eyes, and fair skin. She is famous for her fashionably small waist. (Note: "[T]here was no one in Fayetteville, Jonesboro or in three counties, for that matter, who had so small a waist." With a tightly-laced corset, she could fit into a dress with a 17-inch waist.) Scarlett has two younger sisters, Susan Elinor ("Suellen") O'Hara and Caroline Irene ("Carreen") O'Hara, and three little brothers who died in infancy. Her baby brothers are buried in the family burying ground at Tara, and each was named Gerald O'Hara Jr.

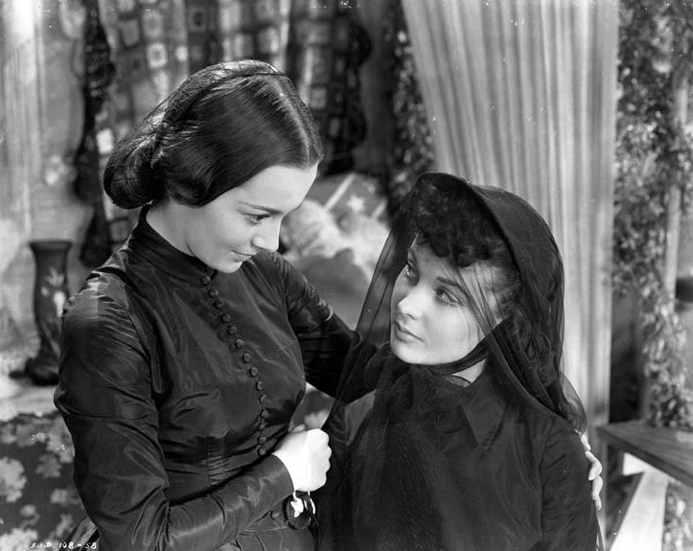
Scarlett and sister-in-law Melanie Hamilton

Scarlett begins the novel unmarried, but with many beaus in the county; however, as a result of Ashley Wilkes' rejection, she marries Charles Hamilton, who dies before the birth of their son, Wade Hampton Hamilton. Later, in the midst of Tara's threat, Scarlett marries Frank Kennedy, Suellen's beau, for financial security for Tara and to provide for the family. They have Ella Lorena Kennedy together. Kennedy dies in a KKK raid on Shantytown, where Scarlett was attacked, because the Union army knew about it and laid a trap. She continues to marry—Rhett Butler, for his money, again—although she admits she is “fond” of him. They have Eugenia Victoria, a.k.a. “Bonnie Blue” Butler; however, she dies after a tragic riding accident. Unable to reconcile, Rhett leaves Scarlett, although Scarlett ends the novel vowing to try to win him back.

== Character summary ==
When the novel opens, Scarlett O’Hara is sixteen. She is vain, self-centered, and very spoiled by her wealthy parents. She can also be insecure, but is very intelligent, despite the Old South's pretense of ignorance and helplessness. She is somewhat unusual among Southern women, whom society preferred to act as dainty creatures who needed protection from their men. Scarlett is aware that she is only acting empty-headed, and resents the "necessity" of it, unlike most of her Southern belle peers, including Melanie Hamilton and India Wilkes. Outwardly, Scarlett is the picture of Southern charm and womanly virtues, and a popular belle among the country males. The one man she truly desires, however, is her neighbor, Ashley Wilkes—the one man she cannot have. The Wilkes family has a tradition of intermarrying with their cousins, and Ashley is betrothed to his cousin, Melanie Hamilton of Atlanta. Scarlett's motivation in the early part of the novel centers on her desire to win Ashley's heart. When he refuses her advances—which no “Southern Lady” would be so forward as to make—she takes refuge in childish rage, and she spitefully accepts the proposal of Charles Hamilton, Melanie's brother, in a misguided effort to get back at Ashley and Melanie.

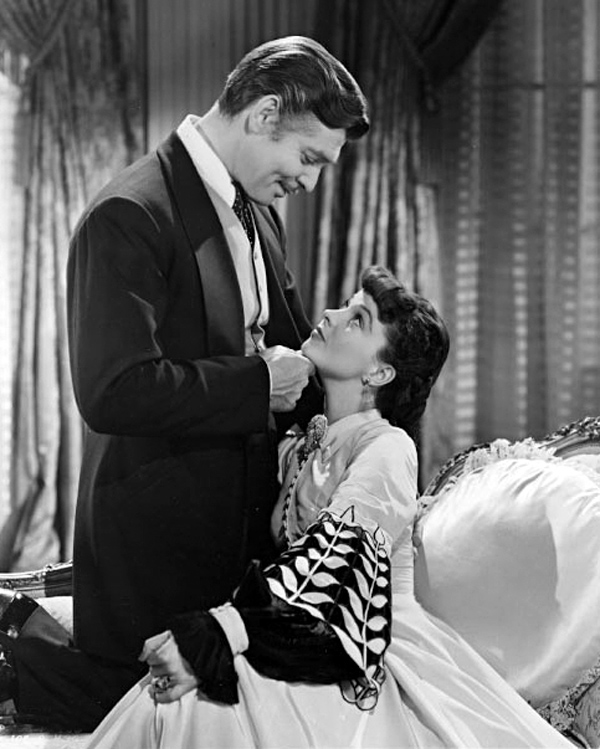
Scarlett with third husband Rhett Butler

Rhett Butler, a wealthy older bachelor and a societal pariah, overhears Scarlett express her love to Ashley during a barbecue at Twelve Oaks, the Wilkes' estate. Rhett admires Scarlett's willfulness and her departure from accepted propriety as well as her beauty. He pursues Scarlett, but is aware of her impetuousness, childish spite, and her fixation on Ashley. He assists Scarlett in defiance of proper Victorian mourning customs when her husband, Charles Hamilton, dies in a training camp. Rhett encourages her spirited behavior in Atlanta society. Scarlett, privately frustrated by the strict rules of polite society, finds friendship with Rhett liberating.

The Civil War sweeps away the lifestyle in which Scarlett was raised, and Southern society falls into ruin. Scarlett, left destitute after Sherman's army marches through Georgia, becomes the sole source of strength for her family. Her character begins to harden as her relatives, the family slaves and the Wilkes family look to her for protection from homelessness and starvation. Scarlett becomes money-conscious and more materialistic in her motivation to ensure that her family survives and Tara stays in her possession, while other Georgian plantation owners lose their homes. This extends to first offering herself as a mistress to Rhett; although after Rhett's rejection, Scarlett resorts to marrying her younger sister's beau, Frank Kennedy, investing in and starting a business herself, engaging in controversial business practices, and even exploiting convict labor in order to make her lumber business profitable. Her conduct results in the accidental death of Frank, and shortly after, she marries Rhett Butler for "fun" and because he is very wealthy. They have a little girl named Bonnie, but she dies from a horseback riding accident that leaves Rhett and Scarlett's relationship unstable.

Scarlett is too fixated on Ashley Wilkes to realize her pursuit of him is misdirected until the climax of the novel. With the death of Melanie Wilkes, she realizes her pursuit of Ashley was a childish romance, and she has loved Rhett Butler for some time. She pursues Rhett from the Wilkes home to their home, only to discover he has given up hope of ever receiving her love and is about to leave her. After she tells him she loves him, he refuses to stay with her, which leads to the famous line in the movie, "Frankly, my dear, I don't give a damn." Wracked with grief but determined to win him back, Scarlett returns to Tara to regain her strength and create a plan to reunite with Rhett.

== Common character analysis ==
Scarlett's character, portrayed in both the novel and the 1939 film, is, at face value, unscrupulous and selfish, but her character development ultimately portrays multiple stigmas throughout that support Mitchell's theme. In a rare interview, Mitchell admitted the theme of the novel was “survival,” specifically shown through exploring human behavior in the face of the catastrophe of the Civil War. Decades later, literary critics and authors agree that Scarlett's revolution from a spoiled, wealthy girl—typical of her socioeconomic status—to becoming an independent woman in an unforgiving society and unstable economy is a testament to the development of Mitchell's character.

Lisa Bertagnoli, author of Scarlett Rules, compared Scarlett to a chameleon by morphing herself from a pampered girl to a "no-nonsense businesswoman responsible for feeding not only herself, but her extended family as well." Scarlett stands out in the novel because she alone, among her female peers, is the only one who survives and thrives despite Sherman's March through Atlanta, despite being widowed twice, despite being a woman in a patriarchal society. She was told "no" to almost every action she did to survive, by both societal standards and her female and male peers around her, such as marrying Frank Kennedy for money or even running a successful business, and in return, she told them "watch me" in the process.

Scarlett struggled with her status as a woman because of the standards of the "Southern Lady" invoked and shown at the beginning of the novel, and displayed throughout Scarlett's peers, embodied in Melanie Wilkes. However, this is clearly challenged by Scarlett because of the dire conditions she is meant to face and endure. Therefore, those standards of the "Southern Lady" are discarded because the standards do not meet her physical needs, nor are they useful to her physical survival. The essence of the public responsibility of being a "lady" is flagrantly disregarded because of her commitment to survival (Fox-Genovese, p. 400). Thus, she is ostracized from her peers. Scarlett does not uphold the same code of standards as she did in the beginning of the novel because her motivations changed from societal and class standings to economic status and physical survival.

== Inspiration for the character ==
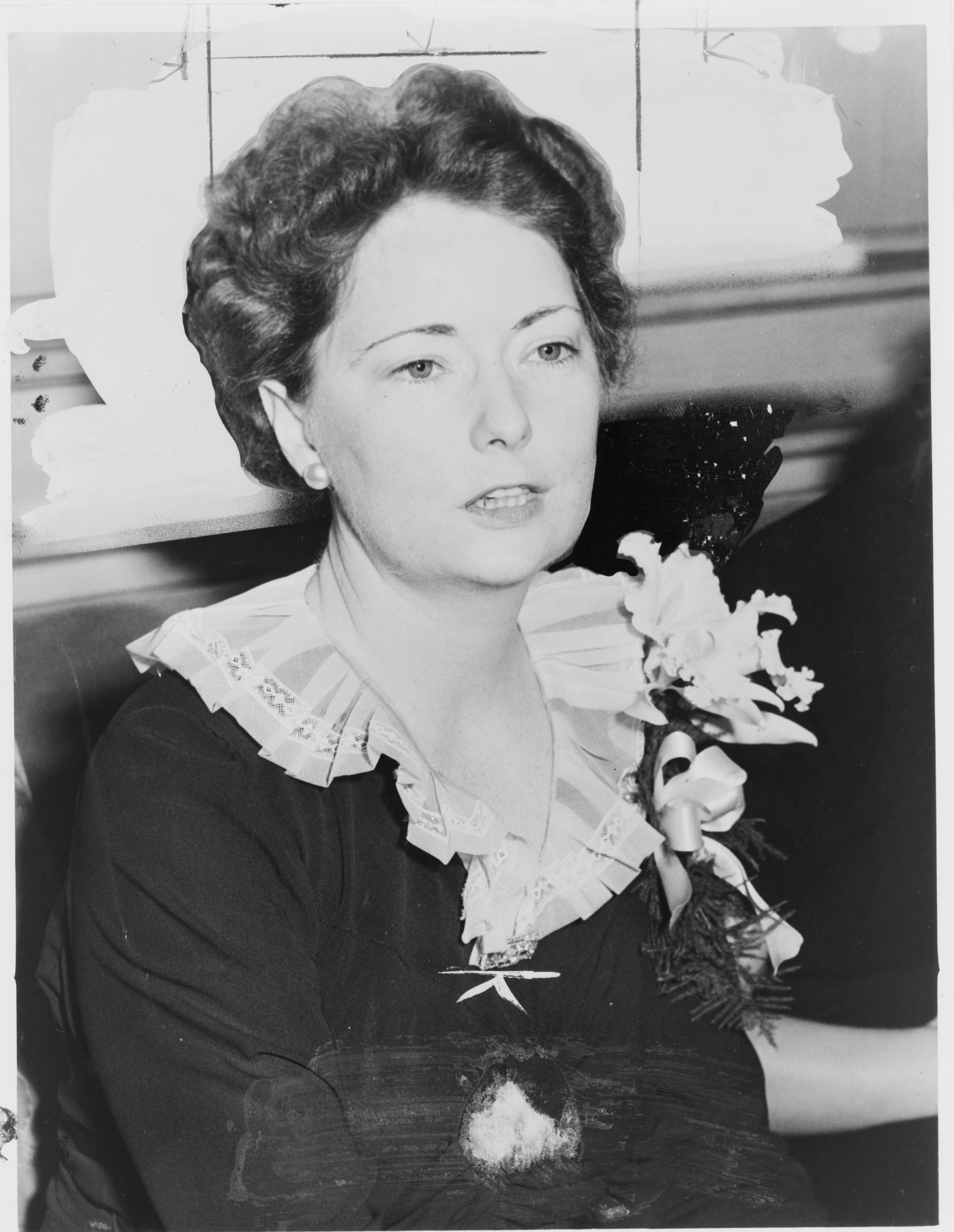
Margaret Mitchell

Margaret Mitchell used to say that her Gone with The Wind characters were not based on real people, although modern researchers have found similarities to some of the people in Mitchell's own life. Scarlett's upbringing resembled that of Mitchell's maternal grandmother, Annie Fitzgerald Stephens (1844–1934), who was raised predominantly Irish Catholic on Rural Home plantation near Jonesboro in Fayette, not unlike the O’Hara family. Mitchell was engaged three times, although only married twice. Her first engagement was to Clifford Henry, a bayonet instructor at Camp Gordon in World War I. He was killed overseas in October 1918 while fighting in France, similar to O’Hara and her first husband, Charles Hamilton. Mitchell's mother, Maybelle Stephens Mitchell, contracted influenza and died shortly before Mitchell could reach home, similar to Ellen O’Hara dying before Scarlett fled Atlanta. Rhett Butler is thought to be based on Mitchell's first husband, Red Upshaw, because Upshaw left Atlanta for the Midwest and never returned. Her second marriage was to John Robert Marsh, and they were married until her death in 1949.

== In the 1939 film ==
=== Casting ===
While the studio and the public agreed that the part of Rhett Butler should go to Clark Gable (except for Clark Gable himself), casting for the role of Scarlett was harder. The search for an actress to play Scarlett in the film version of the novel famously drew the biggest names in the history of cinema, such as Bette Davis (who had been cast as a Southern belle in Jezebel in 1938), and Katharine Hepburn, who went so far as demanding an appointment with producer David O. Selznick and saying, "I am Scarlett O'Hara! The role is practically written for me." Selznick replied rather bluntly, "I can't imagine Rhett Butler chasing you for twelve years." Jean Arthur and Lucille Ball were also considered, as well as relatively unknown actress Doris Davenport. Susan Hayward was "discovered" when she tested for the part, and the career of Lana Turner developed quickly after her screen test. Tallulah Bankhead and Joan Bennett were widely considered to be the most likely choices until they were supplanted by Paulette Goddard.

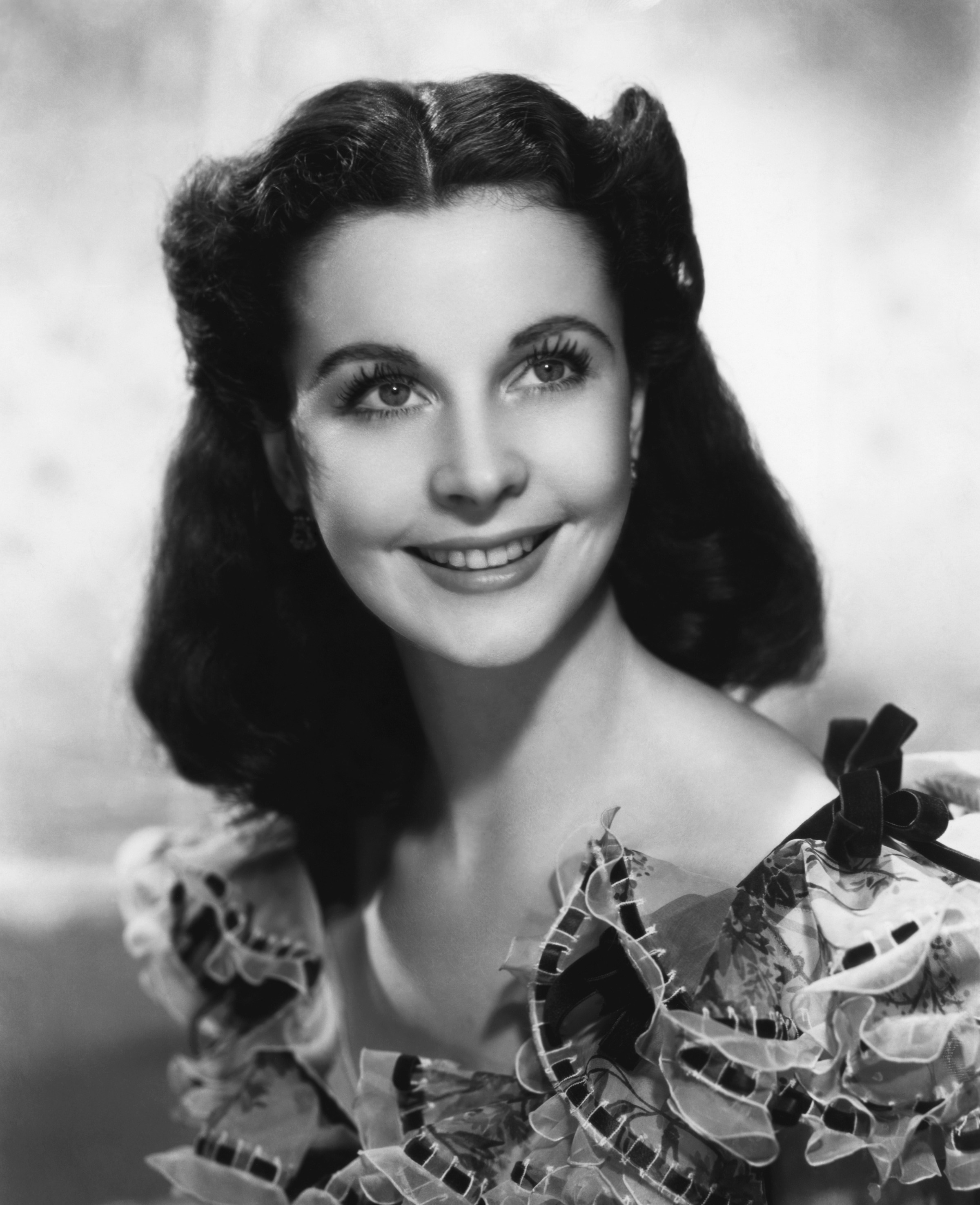
Vivien Leigh as Scarlett O'Hara

The young English actress Vivien Leigh, virtually unknown in America, saw that several English actors, including Ronald Colman and Leslie Howard, were in consideration for the male leads in Gone with the Wind. Her agent happened to be the London representative of the Myron Selznick talent agency, headed by David Selznick's brother, Myron. Leigh asked Myron to put her name into consideration as Scarlett on the eve of the American release of her picture Fire Over England in February 1938. David Selznick watched both Fire Over England and her most recent picture, A Yank at Oxford, that month, and thought she was excellent but in no way a possible Scarlett, for she was "too British". But Myron Selznick arranged for David to first meet Leigh on the night in December 1938 when the burning of the Atlanta Depot was being filmed on the Forty Acres backlot that Selznick International and RKO shared. Leigh and her then lover Laurence Olivier (later to be her husband) were visiting as guests of Myron Selznick, who was also Olivier's agent, while Leigh was in Hollywood hoping for a part in Olivier's current movie, Wuthering Heights. In a letter to his wife two days later, David Selznick admitted that Leigh was "the Scarlett dark horse", and after a series of screen tests, her casting was announced on January 13, 1939. Just before the shooting of the film, Selznick informed Ed Sullivan: "Scarlett O'Hara's parents were French and Irish. Identically, Miss Leigh's parents are French and Irish."

In any case, Leigh was cast—despite public protest that the role was too "American" for an English actress—but Leigh was able to pull off the role so well that she eventually won an Academy Award for her performance as Scarlett O'Hara.

==== Other actresses considered ====
The search for Scarlett began shortly after the announcement of the film adaptation and lasted for over two years. Between late 1937 and mid-1938, approximately 128 actresses were nominated for the role of Scarlett through letters of suggestion sent to Selznick International Pictures from the public. The following actresses were among those considered or auditioned for the role, which required playing Scarlett from 16 years of age until she was 28 (actress age in 1939, the year of Gone with the Wind's release, when Leigh was 26).

- Lucille Ball (28)
- Constance Bennett (35)
- Clara Bow (34)
- Mary Brian (33)
- Ruth Chatterton (47)
- Claudette Colbert (36)
- Joan Crawford (31–35)
- Bette Davis (31)
- Irene Dunne (41)
- Madge Evans (30)
- Glenda Farrell (35)
- Alice Faye (24)
- Joan Fontaine (22), sister of Olivia de Havilland, who played Melanie (23)
- Kay Francis (34)
- Janet Gaynor (33)
- Katharine Hepburn (32)
- Miriam Hopkins (37)
- Rochelle Hudson (23)
- Dorothy Lamour (25)
- Carole Lombard (31)
- Myrna Loy (34)
- Pola Negri (42)
- Maureen O'Sullivan (28)
- Merle Oberon (28)
- Ginger Rogers (28)
- Norma Shearer (37)
- Ann Sheridan (24)
- Gale Sondergaard, who also was considered for but ultimately lost the role of the Wicked Witch of the West the same year (40)
- Barbara Stanwyck (32)
- Gloria Stuart (29)
- Margaret Sullavan (30)
- Gloria Swanson (40)
- Mae West (46)
- Jane Wyman (22)
- Loretta Young (26)

Out of these considered, only 31 actresses made screen tests, including (with the date of their initial screen test and their age at the time):

- Louise Platt (September 1936, 21)
- Tallulah Bankhead (December 1936, 34)
- Liz Whitney Tippett (April 1937, 32)
- Linda Watkins (June 1937, 29)
- Adele Longmire (August 1937, 19)
- Haila Stoddard (November 1937, 23)
- Susan Hayward (December 1937, 20; tested under her birth name Edith Marrener)
- Brenda Marshall (February 1938, 22; tested under her birth name Ardis Ankerson)
- Paulette Goddard (February 1938, 27)
- Ellen Drew (February 1938, 23; tested under the name Terry Ray)
- Anita Louise (February 1938, 23)
- Margaret Tallichet (March 1938, 24)
- Frances Dee (March 1938, 28)
- Nancy Coleman (September 1938, 25)
- Doris Davenport (October 1938, 21; tested under her birth name Doris Jordan)
- Marcella Martin (October 1938, 22; eventually won the role of Cathleen Calvert)
- Margaret Hayes (October 1938, 21; tested under the name Fleurette DeBussy)
- Lana Turner (November 1938, 17)
- Diana Barrymore (November 1938, 17)
- Jean Arthur (December 1938, 38)
- Joan Bennett (December 1938, 28)
- Vivien Leigh (December 1938, 25)

Turner was eliminated after her screen test, with Cukor feeling she was too young to have the depth the role required.

By December 1938, Cukor and Selznick had narrowed the decision down to Goddard and Leigh. On December 21, both actresses were given Technicolor screen tests, the only ones to receive the tests. Leigh was chosen following the tests, a controversial choice among the public since she was not an American.

=== In other adaptations ===
- A 1966 musical stage adaptation was a major hit in Japan and London's West End, but failed to survive in America, where it starred Lesley Ann Warren and Harve Presnell. It closed after engagements in Los Angeles and San Francisco, never opening on Broadway.
- In 1980, a film about the search for Scarlett O'Hara was made entitled Moviola: The Scarlett O'Hara War with Morgan Brittany playing Vivien Leigh.
- In the 1994 TV mini-series based on the sequel Scarlett, the character was played by English actress Joanne Whalley.
- In the Margaret Martin musical Gone with the Wind, the role of Scarlett O'Hara was originated by Jill Paice.
- In the South Korean stage production Girls' Generation member Seohyun played Scarlett, alongside Bada, former member of S.E.S.

== Comparisons to other characters ==
Troy Patterson of Entertainment Weekly argued that Ally McBeal, the main character of the television series with the same name, has similarities to O'Hara and that "Scarlett and Ally are fairy-tale princesses who bear about as much resemblance to real women as Barbie and Skipper." Patterson wrote that Ally is similar because she is also a child from a ruling class family, "pines hopelessly after an unavailable dreamboat", and has a "sassy black roommate" in place of a "mammy" to "comfort her". Other characters often compared to Scarlett include many female protagonists from other romantic epics, most notably Lara Antipova from the 1965 film Doctor Zhivago and Rose DeWitt Bukater from Titanic (1997) as well as strong-willed women in history, such as Cleopatra, Marie Antoinette and Eva Peron.

Vivien Leigh's subsequent Oscar-winning portrayal of southern belle Blanche DuBois on stage and in the 1951 film adaptation of A Streetcar Named Desire has drawn comparison to her performance as Scarlett. The role was coincidentally originally written for Tallulah Bankhead, who had also auditioned for the Scarlett O'Hara role. The character of Blanche is often viewed as a middle-aged antithesis to the strong-willed, youthful Scarlett. Blanche struggles with mental illness, violent abuse (from Stanley) and severe anxiety. Ultimately, unlike Scarlett, who pulls herself together to overcome her troubles, Blanche descends into madness and gets committed to a mental institution.

== In popular culture ==
In the 1977 song Belle of the Ball from the album Ol' Waylon, by Waylon Jennings, Scarlett O’Hara is mentioned in the opening verse as a comparison to the love of someone, presumed to be his wife Jessi Colter, gave to him.

The Carol Burnett Show parodied the film adaptation three times, most notably Went with the Wind! sketch in its tenth season. Carol Burnett parodied the role twice—once as "Scarlett O'Fever" and the other as "Starlet O'Hara"—while Vicki Lawrence briefly parodied the role another time. The Went with the Wind! sketch was listed by TV Guide as #2 in its list of "The 50 Funniest TV Moments of All Time" in January 1999, while Burnett's dress designed by series costumer Bob Mackie is on display at the Smithsonian Institution.

In John Kennedy Toole's posthumously published 1980 novel A Confederacy of Dunces, an amateur dancer "Harlett O'Hara" (whose real name is Darlene) puts on a "southern belle" performance at Lana Lee's Night of Joy bar. The name is a reference to Scarlett O'Hara. The names "Harla," "Scarla," and "O'Horror" are also used in the vernacular to refer to her.
