= Melanie Hamilton =

Fictional character from Gone With the Wind

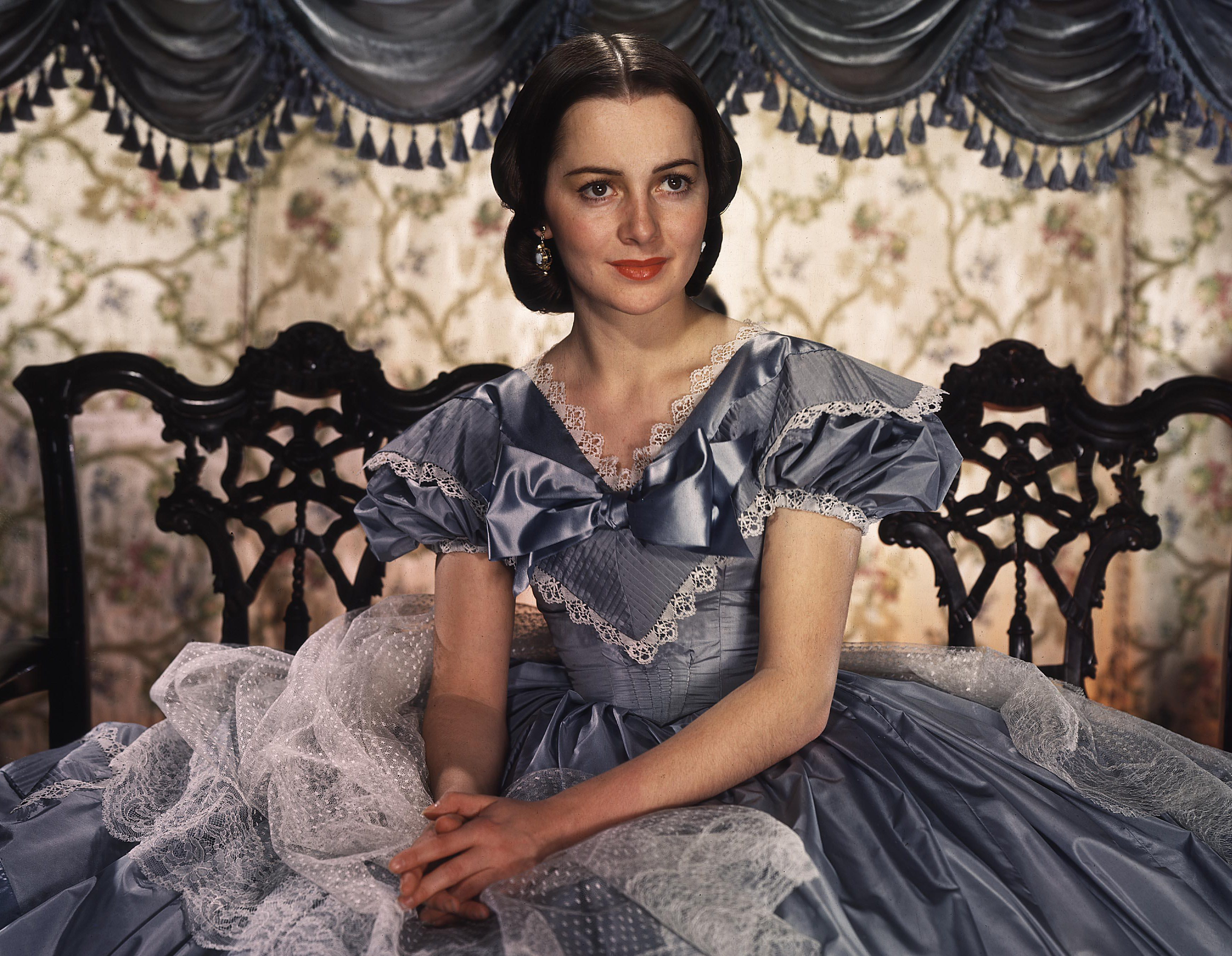
- as portrayed by Olivia de Havilland in Gone With the Wind
- First appearance: Gone with the Wind
- Created by: Margaret Mitchell
- Portrayed by: Olivia de Havilland

In-universe information
- Nickname: Miss Melly
- Family: William Hamilton (father); Charles Hamilton (brother)
- Spouse: Ashley Wilkes (also cousin)
- Children: Beau Wilkes
- Relatives: Henry Hamilton (uncle); Sarah "Pittypat" Hamilton (aunt); Wade Hampton Hamilton (nephew); India Wilkes (cousin); Honey Wilkes (cousin)

Melanie Hamilton is a fictional character first appearing in the 1936 novel Gone with the Wind by Margaret Mitchell. In the 1939 film she was portrayed by Olivia de Havilland. Melanie is Scarlett O'Hara's sister-in-law and eventually her best friend. Mitchell likely based the character on her cousin Sister Mary Melanie Holliday.

== Biography ==
Melanie was born in 1843 or 1844. She and her brother Charles are among the last members left of the wealthy Hamilton family. The family has always valued education and sought to provide its members with the finest available. As a result, they have gained a reputation for producing a fair number of intellectuals and several noted lawyers. For several generations they have intermarried with the like-minded Wilkes family.

Melanie and Charles' parents die when their children are still young. Their father, Col. William R. Hamilton, was described as a hot-tempered, fiery soldier "with a ramrod for a backbone". The two siblings are placed under the joint guardianship of Henry Hamilton and Sarah Jane "Pittypat" Hamilton, their father's brother and sister. Neither Henry nor Pittypat are married and so they consider their nephew and niece as their children. Henry is a lawyer and resident of Atlanta and the family fortune has been placed under his management. Pittypat is described as having the maturity of a child herself. The one actually responsible for raising the two children is Uncle Peter, an African American slave. Peter is fiercely loyal to the Hamiltons and has served the orphans' father during his military service in the Mexican–American War.

Though the Hamiltons are nominally his masters, Peter views them more as his charges and acts as the protector of Pittypat, her niece and nephew throughout their lives. He is described as a brave and intelligent man who, in serving the interests of the Hamiltons, often advises his charges and on several occasions makes decisions for them. Thanks to their devoted uncles and aunt, the siblings grow to be well-educated and well-read young people, but due to their somewhat sheltered environment, they tend to be naive in worldly ways.

=== 1861 ===
In keeping with the family tradition, in April 1861, Melanie becomes engaged to her first cousin, Ashley Wilkes. Melanie is unaware that Scarlett O'Hara intended to marry Ashley. For Scarlett, the news is shocking. Nevertheless, she is present at the engagement celebration, along with her family and most other plantation owners of the county. According to her description, Melanie is a rather petite and delicate young woman with the height and weight of a child. Her most notable feature is a pair of large brown eyes. To Scarlett, she seems quite shy and sweet but not particularly beautiful. However, her way of movement is described as graceful beyond her years. To Scarlett, she seems more interested in discussing books than in flirting with men. While most young girls present at the celebration seek to impress the young men with their dress sense, Melanie is plainly clothed, discussing the works of William Makepeace Thackeray and Charles Dickens.

Scarlett is certain that Ashley will prefer her to Melanie. Confronting him privately, she confesses her love for him. Ashley admits he is attracted to her but he is determined to marry Melanie. His main stated reason is that he believes he has more in common with Melanie than with Scarlett. Scarlett feels disappointed and hurt. In her confusion she decides to hurt Ashley in return by accepting a marriage proposal by Melanie's brother Charles. Scarlett also considers that she is taking revenge against Melanie by marrying her brother.

The wedding takes place two weeks later on April 30, 1861, but Melanie is actually pleased about the marriage as she views her new sister-in-law as a true sister. Melanie seems to take an instant liking to Scarlett and welcomes her to their family. On May 1, 1861, Melanie herself marries Ashley. Meanwhile, the American Civil War has broken out and Georgia is now part of the Confederate States of America. Charles has to leave two weeks after his marriage to enlist in the forces of Wade Hampton, known as "Hampton's Legion". A week later Ashley follows him. In his absence Melanie accepts the invitation of Aunt Pittypat to stay with her in Atlanta. The fortunes of both women are still under the management of Uncle Henry.

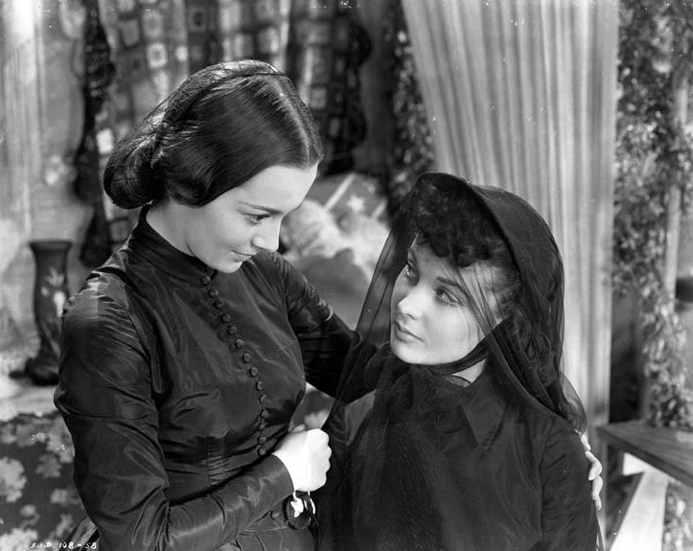
Melanie with her sister-in-law and close friend, Scarlett O'Hara

In Atlanta, Melanie receives two important pieces of news. Her brother has died less than two months after his enlistment, having contracted and recovered from the measles but then succumbing to pneumonia. His share of the family fortune is inherited by Scarlett, his widow. This sad news is followed by the news of Scarlett's pregnancy. Melanie's nephew is born by the end of the year and is named Wade Hampton Hamilton in honor of Charles's leading general, as was the fashion in the South at the time.

Throughout the year both Melanie and her aunt send Scarlett several invitations to join them. Melanie expresses an interest in getting to know her "sister" better and later in seeing her nephew. On the other hand, Scarlett is going through a state of depression. Her mother is concerned about her and finally manages to convince her to accept the invitations. Following a short visit to maternal relatives in Savannah followed by Charleston, South Carolina, Scarlett and her son, accompanied by her maid, Prissy, arrive in Atlanta during the first months of 1862. She is welcomed by Uncle Peter, aging but still determined to take care of his new charges. He brings her to the house of her aunt and sister-in-law.

At first feeling awkward with the thought of living under the same roof with Ashley's wife, Scarlett progressively regains her interest in life. Partly responsible for that is Melanie's interest and affection towards her, though her occasional crushing hugs are hard for Scarlett to get used to. Melanie is serving as a volunteer nurse in the local hospital. Soon Scarlett joins her. Scarlett is somewhat impressed with Melanie's ability to keep a straight face and a smile in the presence of the wounded and her willingness to help and comfort them. Even if some of the gravest wounds make her pale and even cause her to vomit privately, Melanie avoids letting others find out. Scarlett starts considering that her sister-in-law is braver than she appears. At the same time Melanie maintains correspondence with Ashley, and Scarlett is still interested in hearing of his activities.

Scarlett has come to Atlanta intending to stay for a short while and as a visitor, but soon she finds herself settled more permanently and one of Atlanta's socialites. Melanie seems content with the new situation as Scarlett proves to be a better companion than their elderly aunt. At the time Atlanta is seemingly populated mostly by women, by men too old or too young to fight, and the wounded returning from the front. However, a number of men eligible to fight still remain in the city as part of the local militia. Melanie harshly criticizes their presence in the city, while more forces are needed at the front. Scarlett soon finds that, as passively as Melanie usually acts, she can become surprisingly passionate and even aggressive in support of her ideals.

=== 1862 ===
By the summer of 1862, Melanie and Scarlett have been re-acquainted to a man they met during Melanie's engagement celebration: Captain Rhett Butler, at the time about 35 years old. Born to a respected family of Charleston, Rhett was disinherited by his father when he refused to marry according to the latter's wishes. He has worked his way up and has made his own fortune in the California Gold Rush of 1849. He has gained wealth and success as a trader but he has a poor reputation. At the time he and his sailing ship have been smuggling supplies from the United Kingdom of Great Britain and Ireland, France, and even the port of New York Harbor to the Confederacy.

Noted for his cynicism, Rhett observes that he has gained both in wealth and in appreciation by this practice. He seems to take an instant interest in befriending both young women and soon starts flirting with Scarlett. Though this provides a subject of gossip for the local society, Melanie seems to approve of both her friends and verbally defends their reputations.

=== 1863 ===
By early 1863 Rhett has established himself as a friend of both women and a frequent visitor to their house. To Melanie he seems a bitter man in need of a woman to comfort him. On the other hand, Scarlett shares much of his cynical view towards people and their ideas. Both women find some of his ideas disturbing but still thought-provoking. In discussion with patriots and idealists who think this is a just war, Rhett tends to point that all wars seem just to the soldiers fighting them, but that the leaders and orators guiding them to war tend to place themselves behind the lines and are more interested in monetary gain than ideals. Rhett also points out that those ideals are little more than a cover for the actual financial motivation behind wars. Rhett's often stated beliefs have earned him a fair number of enemies, but Melanie and Scarlett are not among them as they also tend to question the motivations behind the war.

Generally less judgmental than most members of her social circle, Melanie is surprised when she is approached by Belle Watling, an affluent prostitute and owner of a local brothel. Belle has become well known in the local society and respected members of it frequent her brothel, but in public she usually finds herself isolated. Intending to contribute part of her weekly earnings as charity for the local hospital, Belle has found her offer being rejected. The idea is that money from such a source would be an insult to the heroic and wounded soldiers. Instead, Melanie accepts the offer. Melanie privately explains to Scarlett, who by this point has become her closest confidante, that in the process she risks her own reputation, but she reasons that the hospital needs any help it can get and that Belle's intentions are noble in this case.

Meanwhile, Ashley has been serving in the Army of Northern Virginia and has been promoted to the rank of major. Having participated in a number of victorious battles, this army is steadily advancing towards the northern states under the orders of General Robert Edward Lee. On July 1, 1863, the army is engaged in battle against the Federals near the village of Gettysburg, Pennsylvania. The Battle of Gettysburg lasted until July 3 and ends in the defeat and retreat of the Confederates. The news of the battle reach Atlanta early but both the outcome and the fates of many of the soldiers remain uncertain for some time after. Many wait to learn news of their relatives and friends. Melanie and Scarlett have a personal interest in the fate of Ashley, whom they both love. When the first lists of casualties reaches Atlanta, both are relieved not to find Ashley among them. But their relief is soon followed by grief as, not surprisingly, Melanie, Scarlett and every resident of Atlanta find many of their acquaintances to be included in the lists. As well, several additions to the lists follow. The battle has been the first major defeat of the Confederates and is considered to have turned the tide of the war.

On December 20, 1863, Ashley returns home. He has received a week-long leave, and it is the first time Melanie and Scarlett have seen him in about two years. The weary soldier is met with the joy and affection of both women and seems to return it. Before leaving to rejoin his unit, Ashley explains to Scarlett his worries about his wife's current health and her fate in case he falls in battle. Ashley meets Scarlett with the specific request to look and care after Melanie in his absence. Scarlett is at first taken by surprise but she agrees. Scarlett accepts Melanie as her new charge and for the first time feels responsible for her sister-in-law and rival in love's health and care. Melanie is left blissfully unaware of the feelings her husband and "sister" have for each other and the latter's new responsibility towards herself.

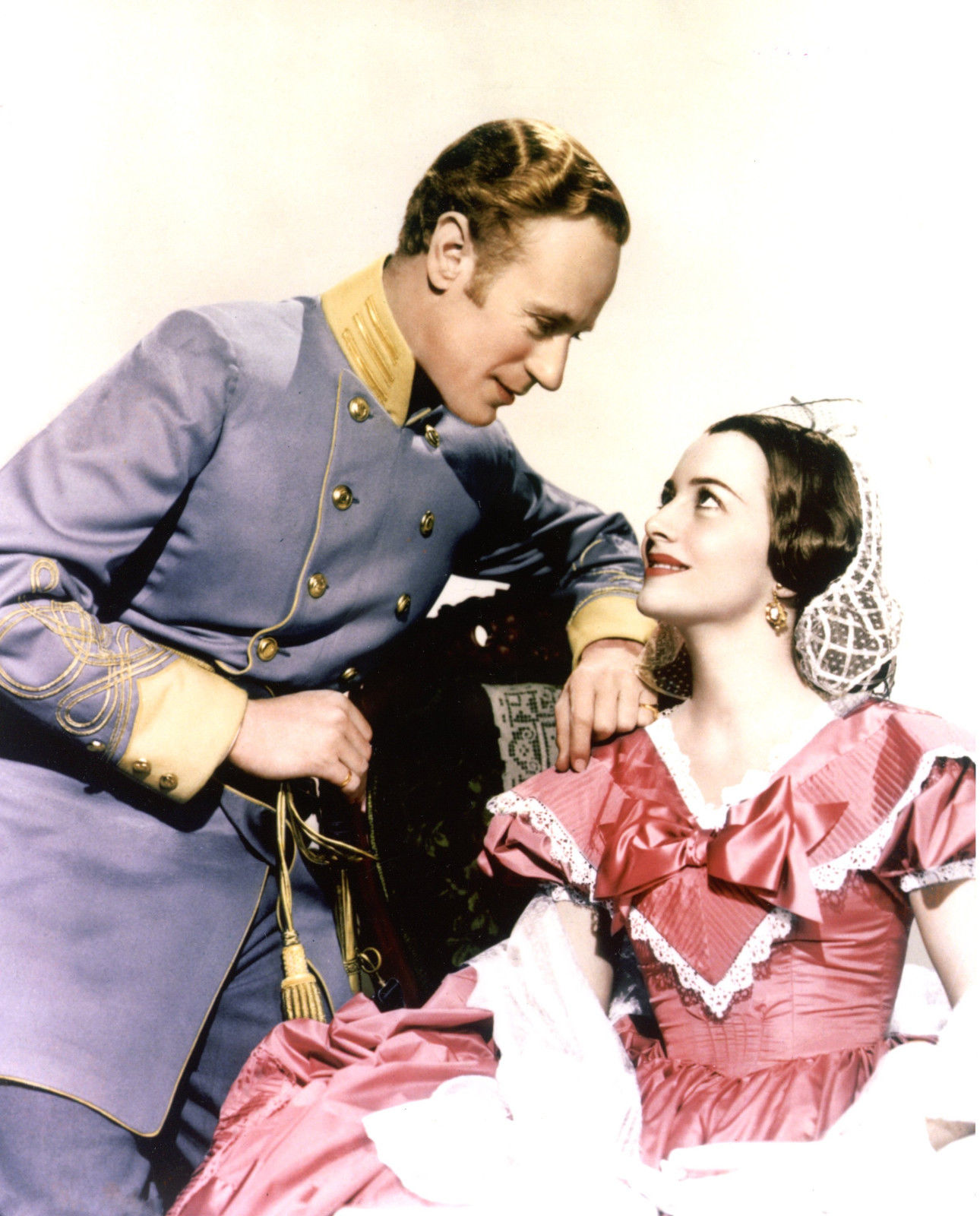
Melanie and husband Ashley Wilkes

=== 1864 ===
Melanie is three months pregnant with Ashley's child in March 1864. Melanie has wanted a child for some time and already acted as a second mother to her nephew Wade. She is glad for the chance to have her own child. Melanie announces the news to Scarlett as soon as she is certain. She expects her friend to share her joy. Having lost her mother years ago, Melanie also seems to expect Scarlett to assume the role of the experienced woman advising her on her pregnancy. Instead Scarlett reacts in surprise, confusion and even anger to finding Melanie pregnant with Ashley's child. Melanie is unable to grasp the reasons for this reaction but fears that she has somehow hurt her friend. Melanie is also met with the fears of the doctor examining her. According to his examination, Melanie's hip bone seems to be too narrow to safely allow her to give birth. In any case Melanie receives a telegram from Ashley's superior officer explaining that her husband has been reported as missing in action for the last three days. Melanie finds herself believed to be a widow.

Turning to each other for comfort, Melanie and Scarlett reconcile. They spend that night crying in each other's arms. But the news of Ashley's death prove to have been premature. Another report informs the two women that efforts to recover his body have failed and that he is considered likely to have been captured by enemy forces. Anxious over her husband's uncertain fate, Melanie grows restless for some time. Even late at night Scarlett can hear Melanie pacing her bedroom back and forth, apparently suffering from insomnia. This practice gradually exhausts her health and at one point she even passes out in public, an unusual incident for her. Fortunately for Melanie, Rhett happens to be near and returns her home safely. Rhett is worried about her, and ascertaining the reasons behind her current state, he promises to use his connections in Washington, D.C., to find out whether Major Wilkes has been captured or not. In exchange, Rhett asks Melanie to promise him that she will try to get some rest.

A month later Rhett informs Melanie and Scarlett what has happened to Ashley: he has been wounded in conflict, captured, and is being held in a prisoner camp in Rock Island, Illinois. The women receive the news with mixed feelings. Their loved one is still alive but for how long is questionable. Rock Island's reputation among the Confederates was no better than that of Andersonville among the Federals; only one quarter of the prisoners held there have ever returned home. The rest die from smallpox, pneumonia and typhus, among other diseases.

Melanie's pregnancy continues even though her health is frail. She is put on bed rest for most of the third trimester of her pregnancy. General William Tecumseh Sherman's troops begin to approach Atlanta. Because of this, Aunt Pittypat and Uncle Peter flee to relatives in Macon, Georgia, and Melanie is left in Scarlett's care. A short while later, Melanie goes into labor. At this time, however, General Sherman is beginning to wage battle with the Home Guard. Scarlett sends her slave, Prissy, to find help, but is unable to find any for various reasons. Scarlett and Prissy are then left no choice but to deliver Melanie's baby themselves. The delivery is very difficult due to Melanie's health and small build. As Scarlett did, Melanie names her son Beauregard, or Beau for short, after Ashley's leading general, Pierre Beauregard.

After her son is born, Melanie and Scarlett make a difficult, dangerous journey to Scarlett's home Tara. There, Melanie, Beau, Scarlett, and Wade live with Scarlet's father, two sisters, and few remaining house slaves. They face much hardship, living in near-constant starvation.

=== 1865 and later ===
After a few months' time, the war finally comes to an end. Eventually, Ashley returns to Tara and Melanie is overjoyed.

Soon, Scarlett remarries her sister's fiancé Frank Kennedy and moves to Atlanta. The Wilkeses move there also with their little boy after Melanie persuades Ashley to help Scarlett start a lumber business. After Frank's accidental death (attributed to Scarlett's controversial business practices), Scarlett marries Rhett Butler.

Melanie becomes a social pillar of Atlanta, known for her charity and kindness. She even takes in an old convict, Archie. He, along with India Wilkes, witness Scarlett's embrace with Ashley one day at the mill. Melanie refuses to believe the rumors that there is anything wrong between her husband and 'sister', and saves Scarlett's reputation by graciously asking her to co-hostess Ashley's birthday party that night.

Melanie and Rhett continue to have a good relationship, even as his and Scarlett's marriage falls apart. Rhett says Melanie is one of the few real ladies he's ever known. After Scarlett falls down the stairs and miscarries, Melanie comforts Rhett, who in a drunken state, cries on her lap, lamenting that his wife never loved him. He almost reveals that Scarlett has long been in love with Ashley before he realizes who he's talking to. He subsequently gives up his feelings for Scarlett and focuses his attentions on their daughter Bonnie, who later dies in a riding accident. It is Melanie that convinces the grief-stricken Rhett to allow them to bury Bonnie after her death.

In 1873, Melanie becomes pregnant again, although Dr. Meade had specifically warned her against it. First being overjoyed, she soon weakens considerably after a miscarriage and calls Scarlett to her. Melanie tells her how much she's loved her, asks her to take care of Beau and of Ashley, and speaks her last words, which involve Rhett Butler and his intense love for Scarlett. Melanie's death serves as a catalyst for the final phase of Scarlett's character growth in the book. Scarlett mourns Melanie's death, and unselfishly thanks God for not allowing the dead woman to know about Ashley's emotional involvement with herself.

== Portrayal and relationship with Scarlett ==
Melanie is the stereotypical southern belle, embodying the femininity and grace idealized by antebellum American Southern culture. During the post-war, society rewards her for her female virtues by making her an unassailable social pillar, and lauding her as a "true lady". She is universally admired by all of the characters for her selfless goodness, though Scarlett occasionally derides her naivety.

Melanie and Scarlett both have different personalities. To people outside their circle, their close relationship is notable. Many assume they remain friends only because of Melanie’s good nature, especially since Scarlett is difficult to get along with. But Melanie has always had showed respect for Scarlett's strength, and she saved Melanie's newborn Beau in difficult times which has made Melanie much grateful to Scarlett.

Melanie is a pedigreed member of the Southern aristocracy from an established family. She is known for her selfless charity, unending kindness, and delicacy. Melanie is frequently ill and sickly. Her husband, Ashley, representing the ideal Southern gentleman, mirrors her background and constitution.

In contrast, Scarlett is a 'mutt' of French and Irish heritage, and only a second-generation member of the plantation owners. During the time period, the Irish were of nearly the same social standing as black Americans, and Scarlett's Irish father gained Tara in a hand of poker. Physically, Scarlett is ferocious in survival, caustic in her relations, and has a sturdy physical constitution that enables her to endure most hardship, being rarely ill.

While Melanie is praised as being the embodiment of the ideal Southern woman, Melanie's literal survival through the war and after is reliant on the 'mutt' Scarlett and Scarlett's breaking of societal rules. During the war, Scarlett is the one to provide the necessary strength to keep them going through starvation and violence, while delicate Melanie must rely on her. Scarlett's willingness to behave outside of the boundaries placed on women, such as killing soldiers, eating scraps, and seducing her sister's beau for money, ensure the continued survival of Melanie and Scarlett's family.

Even after the war, Melanie's survival and position as a Southern matron is reliant on Scarlett's disregard for social niceties, as it is Scarlett's profitable lumber mill and shops which provide Melanie's husband, Ashley, with an income and position. Without the job Scarlett provides, Ashley, and therefore Melanie, would be unable to remain in the South and continue their culture. As a result of Scarlett protecting Melanie during trials, Melanie admires and protects Scarlett as she can in social settings.

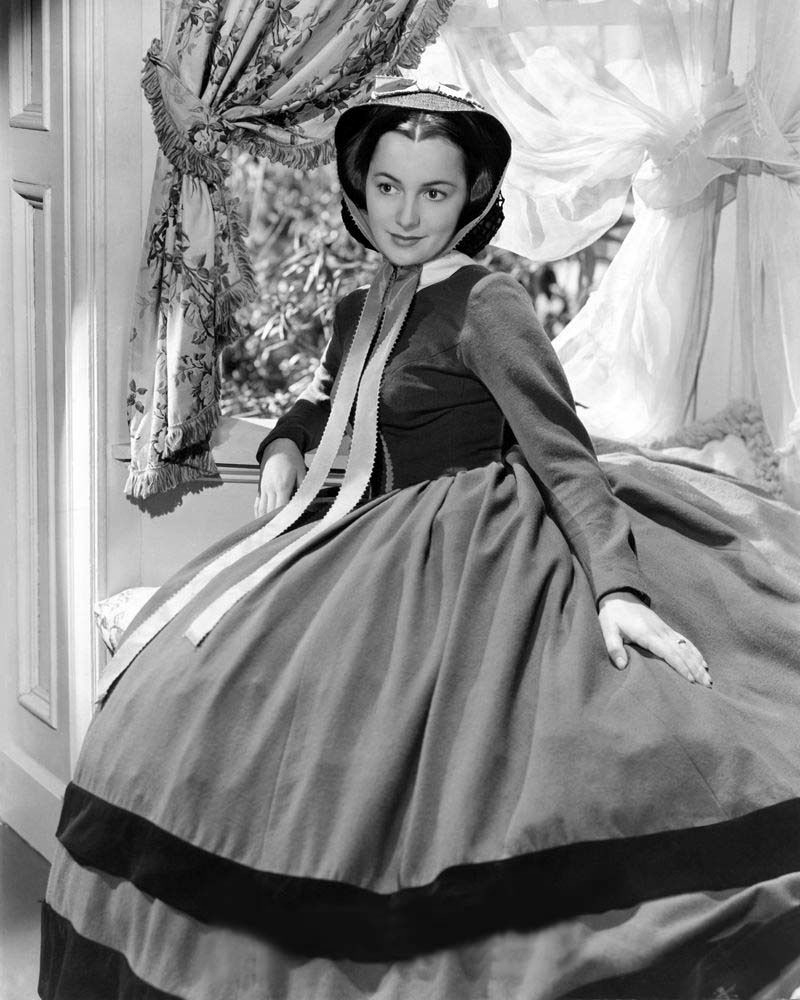
Olivia de Havilland as Melanie in the 1939 film

Melanie being placed on a pillar by Southern society can be viewed as their worship of the time and standards of the past, with the rejection of Scarlett being the rejection of the Southern post-war reality's need for practical survival. Melanie's fading and eventual death reflect the permanent loss of the pre-war glory, and Scarlett's final rejection of Melanie's husband indicate that the South is ready to move on from the past.

== Film ==
In the 1939 film of the same name, Melanie is portrayed by Olivia de Havilland. Her performance was praised, earning her a nomination for the Academy Award for Best Supporting Actress; the award ultimately went to co-star Hattie McDaniel, who played Mammy in the film.
