= Twelve Oaks =

Fictional plantation in Gone with the Wind

Picture of the Atlantic Journal article of the home representing The Twelve Oaks that Margaret Mitchell found

In Margaret Mitchell's 1936 novel Gone with the Wind, Twelve Oaks is the plantation home of the Wilkes family in Clayton County, Georgia named for the twelve great oak trees that surround the family mansion in an almost perfect circle. Twelve Oaks was described as a "beautiful white-columned house that crowned the hill like a Greek Temple," having true Southern charm and whimsy. Margaret Mitchell modeled the home after an actual antebellum mansion located in the historic area of Covington, Georgia. The home that was portrayed as Margaret Mitchell's Twelve Oaks in the 1939 film has been renovated and is now open as a bed and breakfast and event facility in Covington, thirty minutes east of Atlanta.

== Book and film representation ==
=== John Wilkes ===
John Wilkes is a supporting character portrayed as the elderly widowed patriarch of the family. He has three children, Honey Wilkes who is the youngest, India Wilkes who is described as a rival to Scarlett O'Hara and his oldest son Ashley Wilkes, who acts as the main love interest for Scarlett O'Hara. The Wilkeses are described as the wealthiest families in the county, with land, slaves and money second only to those of the Tarleton family of Fairhill Plantation. The Wilkeses are revered by the county folks for their generosity and good nature, but also considered slightly odd because of their interests in reading books and traveling to the North to hear music and view paintings—this sophistication and elegance is attributed to their grandfather being from Virginia, and to them marrying their cousins.

=== Scarlett O'Hara ===
When the novel begins, Gerald O'Hara is returning from Twelve Oaks (having purchased a slave to be wife to his devoted valet Pork) with the news that Ashley Wilkes, with whom 16-year-old Scarlett O'Hara is convinced she is in love, has just formally become engaged to his second cousin, Melanie Hamilton of Atlanta. In spite for what she perceives as Ashley spurning her, Scarlett accepts the impromptu proposal of Melanie's brother Charles, who was expected by all to marry Honey Wilkes (though changed to India in the film, which omits the character of Honey) and as such becomes a relative by marriage to both Melanie and Ashley.

Twelve Oaks suffers terribly in the war from the same shortages and privations as its neighbors. The family is also decimated as first Charles Hamilton dies of pneumonia, then John Wilkes is killed in combat (though elderly, he joined the Home Guard in defense of Atlanta). The mansion is looted and burned by Union troops in 1864; Scarlett finds a straggling cow in the ruins of the home and enough beans and turnips for a meal from its slave quarters gardens but otherwise it is a total loss. Presumably the remnant of the Wilkes family were subject to the same taxes that necessitate Scarlett's marriage to Frank Kennedy to save her own family's home, Tara; the lands were seized when they could not pay.

=== Mansion discrepancy ===
The representation of the plantation house at Tara in the film Gone with the Wind corresponds more or less to the description of the house in the novel. The portrayal of the mansion at Twelve Oaks in the film is exaggerated and bears more resemblance to the Colonial Revival mansions popular in the United States in the first quarter of the 20th Century than it does to the home of an antebellum planter in rural Georgia. During the film's pre-production period, this discrepancy raised mild disapproval from author Margaret Mitchell. Mitchell had envisioned a more ordinary and historically accurate house. Nevertheless, it is the stately mansion from the film with its imperial staircase and improbably high-ceilinged corridors (the product of early paint-on-glass style special effect rather than a physical set) that remains in the public mind as the iconic image of "Twelve Oaks" rather than the more restrained Greek revival house described in the novel.

== The Vampire Diaries ==
The estate was used as the exterior of the Salvatore's 1864 home in “The Vampire Diaries”(2009).

== The Twelve Oaks mansion ==
Built in 1836, The Twelve Oaks in Covington, Georgia is over 11,000 square feet. The home is on the National Register of Historic Places, and is considered by many to be one of the best examples of antebellum architecture in the South. It has been featured in numerous publications and books and, since opening as a bed and breakfast, has received numerous awards. In his book Antebellum Homes of Georgia, David King Gleason writes, "Margaret Mitchell saw a photograph of the house in the Atlanta Journal in February, 1939. She sent the clipping to Atlanta historian and Civil War authority, Wilbur Kurtz who was in Hollywood consulting with the set designers for Gone With the Wind, saying, ‘I like this for Ashley's home,’ referring to Twelve Oaks." In David O. Selznick's film Gone with the Wind, the article is posted next to Twelve Oaks in the movie, so the viewer can see how Margaret Mitchell's inspiration materialized.
