= Donald McCaig =

American poet

- Born: May 1, 1940; Butte, Montana, U.S.
- Died: November 11, 2018 (aged 78)
- Education: Montana State University (BA)
- Occupations: Novelist; poet; essayist; sheepdog trainer

Donald McCaig (May 1, 1940 in Butte, Montana – November 11, 2018) was an American novelist, poet, essayist and sheepdog trainer.

== Early life and education ==
McCaig was born in Butte, Montana and served in the United States Marine Corps for two years. He received a BA in philosophy from Montana State University in 1963 and subsequently completed postgraduate studies in shepherding and sheepdogs.

== Career ==
He had a brief but successful career on New York's Madison Avenue before moving to a sheep farm in Bath County, near Williamsville in the western mountains of Virginia with his wife, Anne.

His 1998 novel, Jacob's Ladder, and his 2008 novel, Canaan, won the Michael Shaara Award for Excellence in Civil War Fiction. Jacob's Ladder also won the Library of Virginia Fiction Award, the John Esten Cooke Award for Southern Fiction, and the W.Y. Boyd Literary Award for Excellence in Military Fiction.

His last work was Ruth's Journey: The Authorized Novel of Mammy from Margaret Mitchell's Gone with the Wind, about the eponymous literary character. His second-to-last was Mr. and Mrs. Dog: Our Travels, Trials, Adventures, and Epiphanies, which draws on twenty-five years of experience raising sheepdogs to vividly describe his—and his dogs June and Luke's—unlikely progress toward and participation in the World Sheepdog Trials in Wales.

Before that, he wrote the highly acclaimed Rhett Butler's People, a sequel to Gone with the Wind authorized by the Margaret Mitchell estate. McCaig was also a contributor to NPR's All Things Considered.

== Bibliography ==
=== Poetry ===
- Last Poems, Grindstone City, Michigan The Alternative Press, 1978

=== Novels ===
- The Butte Polka, New York, NY, Rawson Wade, 1980
- Nop's Trials, New York, NY, Crown Publishers, Inc., 1984, ISBN 978-096506049-3. BOMC, Reader's Digest Condensed Books Large Print Edition, Warner Paperback; British, French, German, Norwegian, Danish, Italian, Dutch, Finnish, Hungarian, Swedish and Japanese. Recorded Books, movie rights sold, QPB edition, Lyons and Burford, NYC, 1992, 2007. BMOC classic hardcover reissue: 1998, 2007.
- Nop's Hope, New York, NY, Crown, 1994. Large Print Edition, Recorded Books, Japanese edition, QPB Lyons & Burford June 1998, 2007, ISBN 0-517-58488-3.
- Jacob's Ladder: A Story of Virginia During the Civil War, New York, NY, W.W.Norton, 1998. Penguin QPB 1999. Recorded Books 1999 ISBN 978-0393337105.
- Canaan, New York, NY, WW Norton, 2007. Recorded Books, March 2007. QPB 2008

=== Nonfiction ===
- Eminent Dogs, Dangerous Men, New York, NY, Harper/Collins, 1991. Large Print, British, German editions. Recorded Books, Harper Perennial Paperback, QPB Lyons & Burford, June 1998, ISBN 0-06-015997-9.
- An American Homeplace, New York, NY, Crown,1992. Large Print Edition, Recorded Books, QPB, 1997.
- A Useful Dog, Charlottesville, VA, University of Virginia Press, March 2007. Originally printed in a limited edition in Carrollton, OH by Press on Scroll Road, 2004.
- The Dog Wars, Kearney, NE, Outrun Press, 2007.
- Mr. and Mrs. Dog: Our Travels, Trials, Adventures, and Epiphanies, Charlottesville, VA, University of Virginia Press, March 2013. QPB spring 2014 ISBN 978-0813934501.

=== Entertainments ===
- Stalking Blind, New York NY, St. Martin's Paperback, 1976. Movie option.
- The Man who made the Devil Glad, New York, NY, Crown, 1986. British edition, large print edition, recorded books, St. Martin's Paperback, movie option.
- The Bamboo Cannon: New York, NY, Crown, 1989. Large print edition, recorded books
- Rhett Butler's People: New York, NY, St.Martins, Nov. 2007. Large print, recorded books, QPB 2008. British, German, French, Spanish, Catalan Czech, Russian, Italian, Japanese, Mandarin, Korean, Danish, Polish, Serbian, Portuguese, Bulgarian, Norwegian, Lettish, Slovak, Dutch, Swedish, Finnish, Hungarian, Bahasa Indonesian, Romanian.
- Ruth's Journey: New York, NY, Atria Books, Nov 2014. Large print edition, paperback, e-book, recorded books

=== Ephemera ===
- Poetry in Harper's Magazine, Extensions, Clear Creek
- Nonfiction in The Atlantic, The Bark, Harper's Magazine, GQ, Sports Illustrated, Outside, Country Journal, Smithsonian, The New York Times Magazine
- Reviews, articles, OpEd pieces in The Washington Post, The New York Times, Los Angeles Times, New York Newsday
- Introductory essays for Konrad Lorenz’ Man Meets Dog and Vicki Hearne's Adam's Task
- Anthologies. Radio commentaries on National Public Radio's All Things Considered
