= Alexandra Ripley =

American writer (1934-2004)

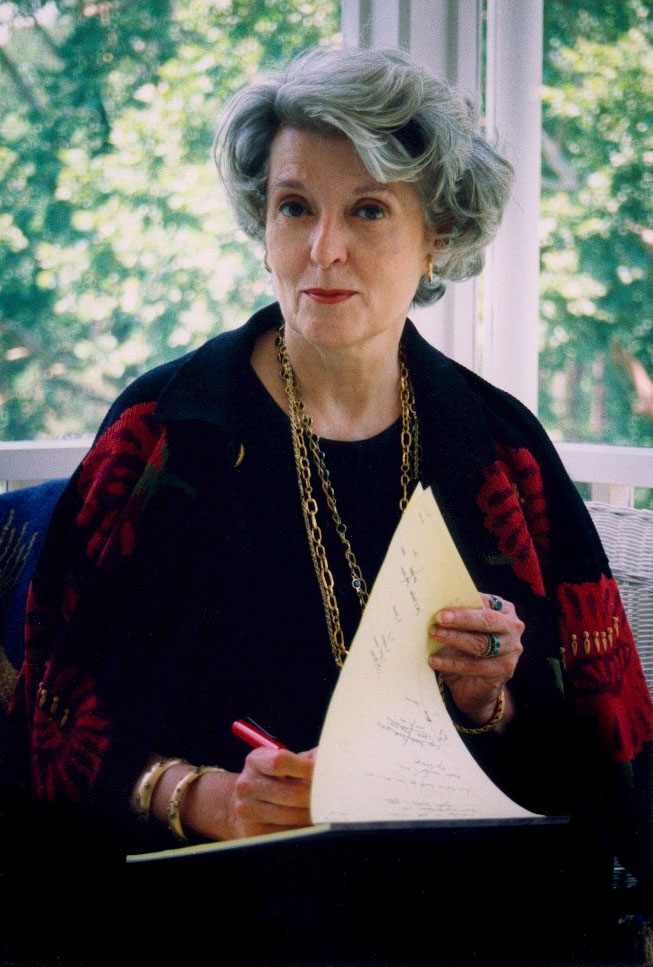
Alexandra Ripley at her home (1997) Photo by Osmund Geier

Alexandra Ripley (née Braid; January 8, 1934 – January 10, 2004) was an American writer best known as the author of Scarlett (1991), written as a sequel to Gone with the Wind. Her first novel was Who's the Lady in the President's Bed? (1972). Charleston (1981), her first historical novel, was a bestseller, as were her next books On Leaving Charleston (1984), The Time Returns (1985), and New Orleans Legacy (1987).

== Biography ==
Born Alexandra Elizabeth Braid in Charleston, South Carolina, she attended the elite Ashley Hall and received a Bachelor of Arts degree from Vassar College in Poughkeepsie, New York in 1955 with a major in the Russian language. She was married three times: from 1958 to 1963 to Leonard Ripley, an early partner and recording engineer at Elektra Records, from 1971 to 1981 to Thomas Martin Garlock (1929–2008), and in 1981 to John Vincent Graham (1926–2007), a former professor at the University of Virginia, from whom she was legally separated at the time of her death.

Ripley was selected by the Margaret Mitchell estate to write a sanctioned sequel to Gone With the Wind. Scarlett was panned by critics. Despite this, the novel was a commercial success; Scarlett sold millions of copies and remains in print.

She died of natural causes at her home in Richmond, Virginia, and is survived by two daughters.

== Selected works ==
=== Novels ===
- 1972: Who's the Lady in the President's Bed? (as B.K. Ripley)
- 1981: Charleston
- 1984: On Leaving Charleston
- 1985: The Time Returns
- 1987: New Orleans Legacy
- 1991: Scarlett
- 1994: From Fields of Gold
- 1997: A Love Divine

=== Non-fiction ===
- 1974: Caril (as B.K. Ripley, with Nanette Beaver & Patrick Trese)
