= 1996 in literature =

This article contains information about the literary events and publications of 1996.

== Events ==
- July 8 – Harper Lee's To Kill a Mockingbird, Mark Twain's Huckleberry Finn and 30 other books are struck from an English reading list in Lindale, Texas, as they "conflict with the values of the community."
- July 11 – As requested by Nelson Mandela, Benjamin Zephaniah hosts the President's Two Nations Concert at London's Royal Albert Hall.
- October 3 – The first performance is held in New York of Eve Ensler's episodic feminist play The Vagina Monologues.
- unknown dates
  - In the UK, the first Orange Prize for Fiction for female novelists goes to Helen Dunmore for A Spell of Winter.
  - Peter O'Donnell publishes Cobra Trap, a final volume featuring Modesty Blaise. The first appeared in 1965.
  - Margaret Mitchell's lost first novella, Lost Laysen, is published, 80 years after it was written.
  - Lady Mary Wortley Montagu's Romance Writings, including her novel Princess Docile, are first published 234 years after her death.

== New books ==
=== Fiction ===
- Anonymous (Joe Klein) – Primary Colors: a novel of politics
- Jeffrey Archer – The Fourth Estate
- Margaret Atwood – Alias Grace
- Beryl Bainbridge – Every Man for Himself
- David Baldacci – Absolute Power
- Iain M. Banks – Excession
- David Bergen – A Year of Lesser
- Dionne Brand – In Another Place, Not Here
- Larry Brown – Father and Son
- Candace Bushnell – Sex and the City
- Brett Butler – Knee Deep in Paradise
- Tom Clancy – Executive Orders
- Joseph Connolly – This Is It
- Bernard Cornwell – The Bloody Ground and Enemy of God
- Douglas Coupland – Polaroids from the Dead
- Amanda Craig – A Vicious Circle
- Robert Crais – Sunset Express
- John Darnton – Neanderthal
- Donald Davidson – The Big Ballad Jamboree
- Seamus Deane – Reading in the Dark
- Joan Didion – The Last Thing He Wanted
- Stephen R. Donaldson – The Gap into Ruin: This Day All Gods Die
- Ben Elton – Popcorn
- Steve Erickson – Amnesiascope
- Helen Fielding – Bridget Jones's Diary
- Jon Fosse – Melancholy II (Melancholia II)
- Neil Gaiman
  - The Sandman: The Kindly Ones (graphic novel; ninth in The Sandman series)
  - The Sandman: The Wake (graphic novel; tenth in The Sandman series)
- John Gardner – Cold
- Richard Garfinkle – Celestial Matters
- Alex Garland – The Beach
- William Golding – The Double Tongue
- John Grisham – The Runaway Jury and Hackers (short stories)
- James L. Halperin – The Truth Machine
- Colin Harrison – Manhattan Nocturne
- Elisabeth Harvor – Let Me Be the One (short stories)
- Nancy Huston – The Goldberg Variations
- Tama Janowitz – By the Shores of Gitchee Gumee
- Matt Jones – Bad Therapy
- Stephen King
  - Desperation
  - The Green Mile
  - The Regulators
- Dean R. Koontz – Intensity
- Michael P. Kube-McDowell – Before the Storm
  - Shield of Lies
  - Tyrant's Test
- Caroline Lamarche – Le Jour du chien (The Day of the Dog)
- Hugh Laurie – The Gun Seller
- John le Carré – The Tailor of Panama
- Paul Leonard – Speed of Flight
- Steve Lyons – Killing Ground
- George R. R. Martin – A Game of Thrones
- David A. McIntee – The Shadow of Weng-Chiang
- Terry McMillan – How Stella Got Her Groove Back
- Javier Marías – When I Was Mortal (Cuando fui mortal, short stories)
- Vladimir Megre – Anastasiya
- Lawrence Miles – Christmas on a Rational Planet
- Rohinton Mistry – A Fine Balance
- Shani Mootoo – Cereus Blooms at Night
- Joyce Carol Oates – We Were the Mulvaneys
- Daniel O'Mahony – The Man in the Velvet Mask
- Kate Orman – Return of the Living Dad and Sleepy
- Chuck Palahniuk – Fight Club
- Lance Parkin – Cold Fusion and Just War
- Marc Platt – Downtime
- Terry Pratchett – Feet of Clay and Hogfather
- Qiu Miaojin (posthumous) – Last Words from Montmartre
- James Redfield – The Tenth Insight
- Justin Richards – The Sands of Time
- Gareth Roberts
  - The English Way of Death
  - The Plotters
- Mary Rosenblum – Synthesis & Other Virtual Realities
- Kristine Kathryn Rusch – The New Rebellion
- Gary Russell – The Scales of Injustice
- Jeff Shaara – Gods and Generals
- Michael Stackpole
  - The Krytos Trap
  - Rogue Squadron
  - Wedge's Gamble
- Dave Stone – Death and Diplomacy
- Graham Swift – Last Orders
- Guy Vanderhaeghe – The Englishman's Boy
- David Foster Wallace – Infinite Jest
- Daniel Woodrell – Give Us a Kiss
- Monika Maron – Animal Triste

=== Children and young people ===
- K.A. Applegate – Animorphs series
- Marion Zimmer Bradley (with Rosemary Edghill) – Witchlight
- Eve Bunting (with Ned Bittinger) – The Blue and the Gray
- James C. Christensen (with Renwick St. James and Alan Dean Foster) – Voyage of the Basset
- Anne Fine – The Tulip Touch
- Elaine Forrestal – Someone Like Me
- Mem Fox – Boo to a Goose
- Mark Helprin (with Chris Van Allsburg) – A City in Winter
- E. T. A. Hoffmann (with Roberto Innocenti) – The Nutcracker
- Lyll Becerra de Jenkins – So Loud a Silence
- Julius Lester – Sam and the Tigers: A New Telling of Little Black Sambo
- Anne McCaffrey – No One Noticed the Cat
- Michael Morpurgo – The Butterfly Lion
- Jim Murphy – A Young Patriot: The American Revolution as Experienced by One Boy
- Andre Norton (with Martin H. Greenberg and Mark Hess) – Catfantastic IV
- Joyce Carol Oates (with Barry Moser) – First Love: A Gothic Tale
- Iona Opie – My Very First Mother Goose
- Alan Schroeder – Minty: A Story of Young Harriet Tubman
- Diane Stanley – Leonardo da Vinci
- Jean Ure – Skinny Melon and Me

=== Drama ===
- Jeff Baron – Visiting Mr. Green
- Nick Enright – Blackrock
- Eve Ensler – The Vagina Monologues
- Jon Fosse
  - Barnet (The Child)
  - Nokon kjem til å komme (Someone is going to come) (completed 1993)
- Pam Gems – Stanley
- Jenny Kemp – The Black Sequin Dress
- Ayub Khan-Din – East is East
- Martin McDonagh – The Beauty Queen of Leenane
- Mark Ravenhill – Shopping and Fucking
- Wallace Shawn – The Designated Mourner
- Joshua Sobol – Alma
- Shelagh Stephenson – The Memory of Water
- Botho Strauß – Ithaka
- Enda Walsh – Disco Pigs
- Peter Whelan – The Herbal Bed
- Roy Williams – The No Boys Cricket Club

=== Non-fiction ===
- Nelson Algren (posthumous) – Nonconformity (essay, written 1953)
- Plinio Apuleyo Mendoza, Carlos Alberto Montaner and Álvaro Vargas Llosa – Guide to the Perfect Latin American Idiot (essay)
- Stephen Ambrose – Undaunted Courage
- Bruce Bawer (editor) – Beyond Queer
- John Berendt – Midnight in the Garden of Good and Evil
- David Chalmers – The Conscious Mind: In Search of a Fundamental Theory
- Norman Davies – Europe: A History
- Richard Dawkins – Climbing Mount Improbable
- David Denby – Great Books
- Antonia Fraser – The Gunpowder Plot: Terror and Faith in 1605
- Daniel Goleman – Emotional Intelligence
- Denis Guedj – Numbers: The Universal Language
- Jennifer Hanson – The Real Freshman Handbook
- Samuel P. Huntington – The Clash of Civilizations and the Remaking of World Order
- Richard Mabey – Flora Britannica
- Howard Marks – Mr Nice
- Dylan Morgan – The Principles of Hypnotherapy
- Anne Mullens – Timely Death
- Denise Schmandt-Besserat – How Writing Came About
- Arun Shourie – Missionaries in India
- Alexander Skutch – The Minds of Birds
- Alessandro Vezzosi – Leonardo da Vinci: The Mind of the Renaissance

== Births ==
- May 29 - R. F. Kuang, American fantasy and contemporary fiction writer
- November 13 - Zeki Majed, Kurdish filmmaker and poet
- December 25 - Elvira Natali, Indonesian author and actress

== Deaths ==
- January 5 – Lincoln Kirstein, American writer and impresario (born 1907)
- January 8 – Howard Taubman, American author and critic (born 1907)
- January 11 – Harold Walter Bailey, English linguistics scholar (born 1899)
- January 16 – Kaye Webb, English publisher and journalist (born 1914)
- January 21 – Efua Sutherland, Ghanaian dramatist, poet and children's author (born 1924)
- January 27 – Barbara Skelton, English fiction writer, memoirist and literary figure (born 1916)
- January 28
  - Jerry Siegel, American cartoonist (born 1914)
  - Joseph Brodsky, Russian-born poet and essayist, Nobel Prize laureate (myocardial infarction, born 1940)
- February 11
  - Bob Shaw, Northern Irish science fiction writer (born 1931)
  - Amelia Rosselli, Italian poet (born 1930)
- February 12 – Ryōtarō Shiba, Japanese novelist (born 1923)
- February 18 – Cathal Ó Sándair, Irish-language novelist (born 1922)
- March 3
  - Marguerite Duras, French dramatist and film director (born 1914)
  - Léo Malet, French crime novelist and surrealist (born 1909)
- March 15 – Wolfgang Koeppen, German novelist (born 1906)
- March 18
  - Jacquetta Hawkes (née Hopkins), English writer and archeologist (born 1910)
  - Odysseas Elytis, Greek writer and Nobel Prize laureate (born 1911)
- March 22
  - Claude Mauriac, French novelist and journalist (born 1914)
  - Ian Stephens, Canadian poet (year of birth not known)
- March 29 – Frank Daniel, Czech-born screenwriter, director, and teacher (born 1926)
- March 31 – Dario Bellezza, Italian poet and dramatist (HIV, born 1944)
- April 16 – Leila Mackinlay, British romantic novelist (born 1910)
- April 18 – Kalim Siddiqui, Pakistani-born English writer and Islamic activist (born 1931)
- April 20 – Christopher Robin Milne, English writer and bookseller (born 1920)
- April 22 – Erma Bombeck, American humorist and writer (born 1927)
- April 23 – P. L. Travers, Australian-born children's writer (born 1899)
- May 2 – Emile Habibi, Palestinian Israeli writer and politician (born 1922)
- May 8 – Larry Levis, American poet, author, and critic (born 1946)
- May 24 – Joseph Mitchell, American journalist (born 1908)
- May 26
  - Ovidiu Papadima, Romanian critic and essayist (born 1909)
  - Margaret Douglas-Home, English writer and musician (born 1906)
- May 31 – Timothy Leary, American psychologist and writer (born 1920)
- June 2 – Leon Garfield, English children's author (born 1921)
- June 14 – Gesualdo Bufalino, Italian novelist (born 1920)
- June 15 – Fitzroy Maclean, Scottish political writer, autobiographer and diplomat (born 1911)
- July 10 – Eno Raud, Estonian children's author (born 1928)
- July 22 – Jessica Mitford, English author, journalist and campaigner (born 1917)
- September 21 – Henri Nouwen, Dutch priest, theologian and author (born 1932)
- September 29 – Shusaku Endo (遠藤周作), Japanese novelist (born 1923)
- October 16 – Eric Malpass, English novelist (born 1910)
- October 24 – Sorley Maclean, Gaelic poet (born 1911)
- November 27 – Lili Berger, Yiddish writer, antifascist militant and literary critic (born 1916)
- December 7 – José Donoso, Chilean writer (born 1924)
- December 9 – Diana Morgan, Welsh playwright and screenwriter (born 1908)
- December 12 – Vance Packard, American journalist and social critic (born 1914)
- December 16 – Quentin Bell, English biographer and art historian (born 1910)
- December 20 – Carl Sagan, American astronomer, astrophysicist and writer (born 1934)
- December 21 – Margret Rey, American author and illustrator (born 1906)

== Awards ==
- Nobel Prize for Literature: Wislawa Szymborska
- Camões Prize: Eduardo Lourenço

=== Australia ===
- The Australian/Vogel Literary Award: Bernard Cohen, The Blindman's Hat
- C. J. Dennis Prize for Poetry: Peter Bakowski, In the Human Night
- Kenneth Slessor Prize for Poetry: Eric Beach, Weeping for Lost Babylon
- Mary Gilmore Prize: Jordie Albiston, Nervous Arcs
- Miles Franklin Award: Christopher Koch, Highways to a War

=== Canada ===
- Bronwen Wallace Memorial Award
- Giller Prize for Canadian Fiction: Margaret Atwood: – Alias Grace
- See 1996 Governor General's Awards for a complete list of winners and finalists for those awards.
- Edna Staebler Award for Creative Non-Fiction: George G. Blackburn, The Guns of Normandy

=== United Kingdom ===
- Booker Prize: Graham Swift, Last Orders
- Carnegie Medal for children's literature: Melvin Burgess, Junk
- James Tait Black Memorial Prize for fiction: Graham Swift, Last Orders, and Alice Thompson, Justine
- James Tait Black Memorial Prize for biography: Diarmaid MacCulloch, Thomas Cranmer: A Life
- Cholmondeley Award: Elizabeth Bartlett, Dorothy Nimmo, Peter Scupham, Iain Crichton Smith
- Eric Gregory Award: Sue Butler, Cathy Cullis, Jane Griffiths, Jane Holland, Chris Jones, Sinéad Morrissey, Kate Thomas
- Orange Prize for Fiction: Helen Dunmore, A Spell of Winter
- Queen's Gold Medal for Poetry: Peter Redgrove
- Whitbread Best Book Award: Seamus Heaney, The Spirit Level

=== United States ===
- Agnes Lynch Starrett Poetry Prize: Helen Conkling, Red Peony Night
- Bernard F. Connors Prize for Poetry: John Voiklis, "The Princeling's Apology", and (separately) Sarah Arvio, "Visits from the Seventh"
- Bobbitt National Prize for Poetry: Kenneth Koch, One Train
- Compton Crook Award: Daniel Graham Jr., The Gatekeepers
- Hugo Award: Neal Stephenson, The Diamond Age, or A Young Lady's Illustrated Primer
- National Book Award: Andrea Barrett, Ship Fever and Other Stories
- National Book Critics Circle Award: for Fiction Gina Berriault, Women in Their Beds
- National Book Critics Circle Award: for Poetry William Matthews, Time and Money
- National Book Critics Circle Award: for General nonfiction Jonathan Harr, A Civil Action
- National Book Critics Circle Award: for Biography Robert Polito, Savage Art: A Biography of Jim Thompson
- Nebula Award: Nicola Griffith, Slow River
- Newbery Medal for children's literature: Karen Cushman, The Midwife's Apprentice
- PEN/Faulkner Award for Fiction: Richard Ford, Independence Day
- Pulitzer Prize for Drama: Jonathan Larson, Rent
- Pulitzer Prize for Fiction: Richard Ford – Independence Day
- Pulitzer Prize for Poetry: Jorie Graham: The Dream of the Unified Field
- Wallace Stevens Award: Adrienne Rich
- Whiting Awards: Fiction: Anderson Ferrell, Cristina García, Molly Gloss, Brian Kiteley, Chris Offutt (fiction/nonfiction), Judy Troy, A.J. Verdelle. Nonfiction: Patricia Storace (nonfiction/poetry). Poetry: Brigit Pegeen Kelly, Elizabeth Spires

=== Elsewhere ===
- Friedenspreis des Deutschen Buchhandels: Mario Vargas Llosa
- International Dublin Literary Award: David Malouf, Remembering Babylon
- Premio Nadal: Pedro Maestre, Matando dinosaurios con tirachinas
