= Defector (disambiguation) =

In politics, a defector is a person who gives up allegiance to one state or political entity in exchange for allegiance to another.

Defector may also refer to:

== Books ==
- The Defector (Maron novel), 1986 German novel by Monika Maron
- The Defector (Silva novel), a 2009 novel by Daniel Silva
- The Defector (Hadfield novel), a 2023 novel by Chris Hadfield

== Film and TV ==
- The Defector (film), a 1966 film
- "The Defector" (The Littlest Hobo), a 1979 television episode
- "The Defector" (Star Trek: The Next Generation), a 1990 television episode
- Defectors (game show), a game show broadcast in the UK
- The Defector: Escape from North Korea, a 2013 documentary film directed by Ann Shin

== Media ==
- Defector Media, a sports blog and media company

== Music ==
- Defector (Steve Hackett album), 1980
- Defector (John Hermann album), 2003
- "Defector", a song by Muse from their 2015 album Drones
- The Defectors, a Danish rock band

== Other ==
- In game theory situations such as the Prisoner's dilemma, a participant who acts to benefit themself, while penalizing the other participant(s)
