= The Wizard in the Woods =

Book by Jean Ure

- Author: Jean Ure
- Illustrator: David Anstey
- Language: English
- Series: The Wizard Trilogy
- Genre: Fantasy, children's literature
- Publisher: Candlewick Press
- Publication date: 1990
- Publication place: United Kingdom
- Followed by: The Wizard in Wonderland

The Wizard in the Woods is a children's fantasy book by Jean Ure and the first book of The Wizard trilogy. It was published in 1990.

== Plot ==
The story begins with the wizard exam of second class jr. wizard Ben Muzzy. Things go awry when he accidentally teleports himself to a mysterious forest. There he meets twins named Gemma and Joel who pledge to help the lost wizard find his way back home.
