= The Wizard in Wonderland =

- First edition
- Author: Jean Ure
- Illustrator: David Anstey
- Language: English
- Series: The Wizard Trilogy
- Genre: Fantasy, children's literature
- Publisher: Candlewick Press
- Publication date: 1991
- Publication place: United Kingdom
- Preceded by: The Wizard in the Woods
- Followed by: The Wizard and the Witch

The Wizard in the Wonderland is the 1991 sequel to The Wizard In the Woods and the second book in the wizard trilogy by Jean Ure.

== Plot ==
The plot details the reunion of junior wizard Ben-Muzzy and his friends Joel and Gemma. They visit Wonderland on Ben-Muzzy's magic broomstick, however their fun is interrupted when a race known as the Airy Fairies steals the broomstick. Now the three friends must retrieve it before it is missed by the other wizards.
