= The Wizard and the Witch =

1995 children's fantasy book by Jean Ure

- First edition
- Author: Jean Ure
- Illustrator: David Anstey
- Language: English
- Series: The Wizard Trilogy
- Genre: Fantasy, children's literature
- Publisher: Candlewick Press
- Publication date: 1995
- Publication place: United Kingdom
- Preceded by: The Wizard in Wonderland

The Wizard and the Witch is a children's fantasy book by Jean Ure. It is the final book of The Wizard trilogy and was published in 1995.

== Plot ==
On “All Spells Night,” Jr. Wizard Ben Muzzy returns to his friends Joel and Gemma for a night of mischief. However, nothing goes as planned when he encounters a bumbling old witch named Grimwade, who can't seem to cast spells correctly.
