= Synthesis & Other Virtual Realities =

1996 collection of science fiction stories by Mary Rosenblum

- Dust-jacket illustration by Bob Eggleton.
- Author: Mary Rosenblum
- Illustrator: Elizabeth Lawhead Bourne
- Cover artist: Bob Eggleton
- Language: English
- Genre: Science fiction
- Publisher: Arkham House
- Publication date: 1996
- Publication place: United States
- Media type: Print (hardback)
- Pages: 280
- ISBN: 0-87054-170-6
- OCLC: 33360809
- Dewey Decimal: 813/.54 20
- LC Class: PS3568.O793 S96 1996

Synthesis & Other Virtual Realities is a collection of science fiction stories by American writer Mary Rosenblum. It was released in 1996 and was the author's first collection of stories. It was published by Arkham House in an edition of 3,515 copies. The stories originally appeared in Isaac Asimov's Science Fiction Magazine.

== Contents ==
Synthesis & Other Virtual Realities contains the following stories:

- "Water Bringer"
- "Entrada"
- "The Centaur Garden"
- "Second Chance"
- "Bordertown"
- "Synthesis"
- "Flood Tide"
- "The Rain Stone"
- "Stairway"

== Reception ==
Gideon Kibblewhite reviewed Synthesis & Other Virtual Realities for Arcane magazine, rating it an 8 out of 10 overall, and stated that "Eerie, melancholy and convincing, it's hard to say exactly when this collection of short stories is set, but it's sometime near. Too near. But if more science fiction was written in this way, maybe we wouldn't be sliding towards this sad world that Rosenblum so beautifully describes."

== Reviews ==
- Review by Gary K. Wolfe (1996) in Locus, #426 July 1996
- Review by Charles de Lint (1996) in The Magazine of Fantasy & Science Fiction, September 1996
- Review by Paul J. McAuley (1996) in Interzone, October 1996
- Review by Darrell Schweitzer (1996) in Aboriginal Science Fiction, Fall 1996
- Review by Peter Heck (1997) in Asimov's Science Fiction, March 1997
- Review by Don D'Ammassa (1997) in Science Fiction Chronicle, April/May 1997
- Review by Paul Di Filippo (1997) in Asimov's Science Fiction, September 1997
