= Harold Latham =

American editor (1887–1969)

- Born: Harold Strong Latham; February 14, 1887; Marlborough, Connecticut
- Died: March 6, 1969 (aged 82); Arlington, New Jersey
- Education: Columbia University (BA)
- Occupations: Editor, publishing executive
- Title: Editor-in-chief of Macmillan Inc.

Harold Strong Latham (February 14, 1887 – March 6, 1969) was an American editor and publishing executive. He was editor-in-chief of Macmillan Inc., where he discovered and edited the works of notable writers including Margaret Mitchell and James Michener.

== Biography ==
Latham was born on February 14, 1887, in Marlborough, Connecticut. He graduated from Columbia in 1909 and joined Macmillan Publishers. He began his career in the advertising department and joined the editorial department that year. He wrote short stories, teenage novels, and plays.

Latham was promoted to vice president of the company in 1931 and retired in 1953 as editor-in-chief of the company. Latham was most known for discovering Margaret Mitchell on a 1935 trip to Atlanta for scouting potential authors. He edited the first version of Gone with the Wind, which became an instant bestseller and one of the most celebrated American novels. Mitchell credited Latham not only for her personal success but also for pursuing the work of other Southern authors, helping to redefine the South in American popular culture.

While an editor at Macmillan, Latham introduced and edited authors such as Edwin Arlington Robinson, Richard Llewellyn, Phyllis Bentley, Mary Ellen Chase, Rachel Field, Agnes Sligh Turnbull, Ernest Poole, Immanuel Velikovsky, and James A. Michener.

From 1947 to 1951, Latham also served as president of the Universalist Church of America and president of its publishing house from 1950 to 1952.

Latham died in Arlington, New Jersey, on March 6, 1969.
