= Animal Triste (novel) =

Novel by Monika Maron

- Author: Monika Maron
- Language: German
- Genre: Fiction
- Publication date: 1996
- Publication place: Germany

Animal Triste, published in 1996, is a German-language novel by author Monika Maron, which took its name from a Latin phrase: "Triste est omne animal post coitum, præter mulierem gallumque" meaning "Every animal is sad after coitus except the human female and the rooster."

The novel is about a love affair between an anonymous female paleontologist from the German Democratic Republic, the protagonist and the narrator, and a male hymenopterologist from the Federal Republic of Germany in the wake of the fall of the Berlin Wall. The major themes of the novel are the identity crisis due to fundamental historical, political, and social changes after the fall of the Berlin Wall, the "symbolic representation of the difficulties of unitying the two German states", and the love and sexuality in old ages.

== See also ==
- 1996 in literature
