= Plague 99 =

1989 novel written by Jean Ure

- UK edition
- Author: Jean Ure
- Cover artist: Daniel Faoro
- Publisher: Methuen (UK); Harcourt (US)
- Publication date: July 1989 (UK); September 1991 (US)
- Publication place: UK
- Pages: 160
- ISBN: 0-15-262429-5
- OCLC: 23211565
- LC Class: PZ7.U64 Pl 1991
- Followed by: Come Lucky April

Plague 99 (ISBN 0-15-262429-5) is a 1989 novel written by Jean Ure. It tells the story of a pandemic that shuts down London, and a group of three teenagers that survive the outbreak. The book takes an apocalyptic view and details the experiences of the three principal characters at the end of the year 1999, as the plague wipes out the population of London in the course of a few weeks. It was written during the Cold War and reflects many aspects of the fears of the time. The principal characters are Fran, her best friend Harriet, and a schoolmate, Shahid.

The book has two sequels set 100 years later called Come Lucky April (also published as After the Plague) and Watchers at the Shrine, which did not receive as much praise as the first by some readers. Come Lucky April follows the story of the descendants of Fran and Harriet, Daniel and April. Daniel, Fran's great-grandson, travels to her home town to find her diary. There he discovers a feminist community founded by Fran's friend Harriet, who was sexually harassed in the original book. In the community, all males are neutered in order to prevent "male aggression". Watchers at the Shrine is set several years later and follows April's son, Hal, when he is sent to live in his father's community to avoid the ritual castration. He ends up at a neighboring community living with religious fanatics who worship "The Power", a religion derived from the awe of a nuclear power station.

== Awards ==
Plague 99 won the Lancashire Children's Book of the Year award in 1990.

== Reviews ==
- Mark Westerby (1989) in Fear, October 1989
- Paul Brazier (1989) in Vector 153
- Phyllis McDonald (1990) in Interzone, #33 January-February 1990
- Jessica Yates (1991) in Paperback Inferno, #91
