= The Real Freshman Handbook =

1996 book by Jennifer Hanson

- Author: Jennifer Hanson
- Language: English
- Publication date: 1996

The Real Freshman Handbook (1996) is a non-fiction book by Jennifer Hanson, which offers "an irreverent and totally honest guide to life on campus". Hanson provides advice on topics ranging from drinking to roommates to the weather.
