= Monika Maron =

German writer

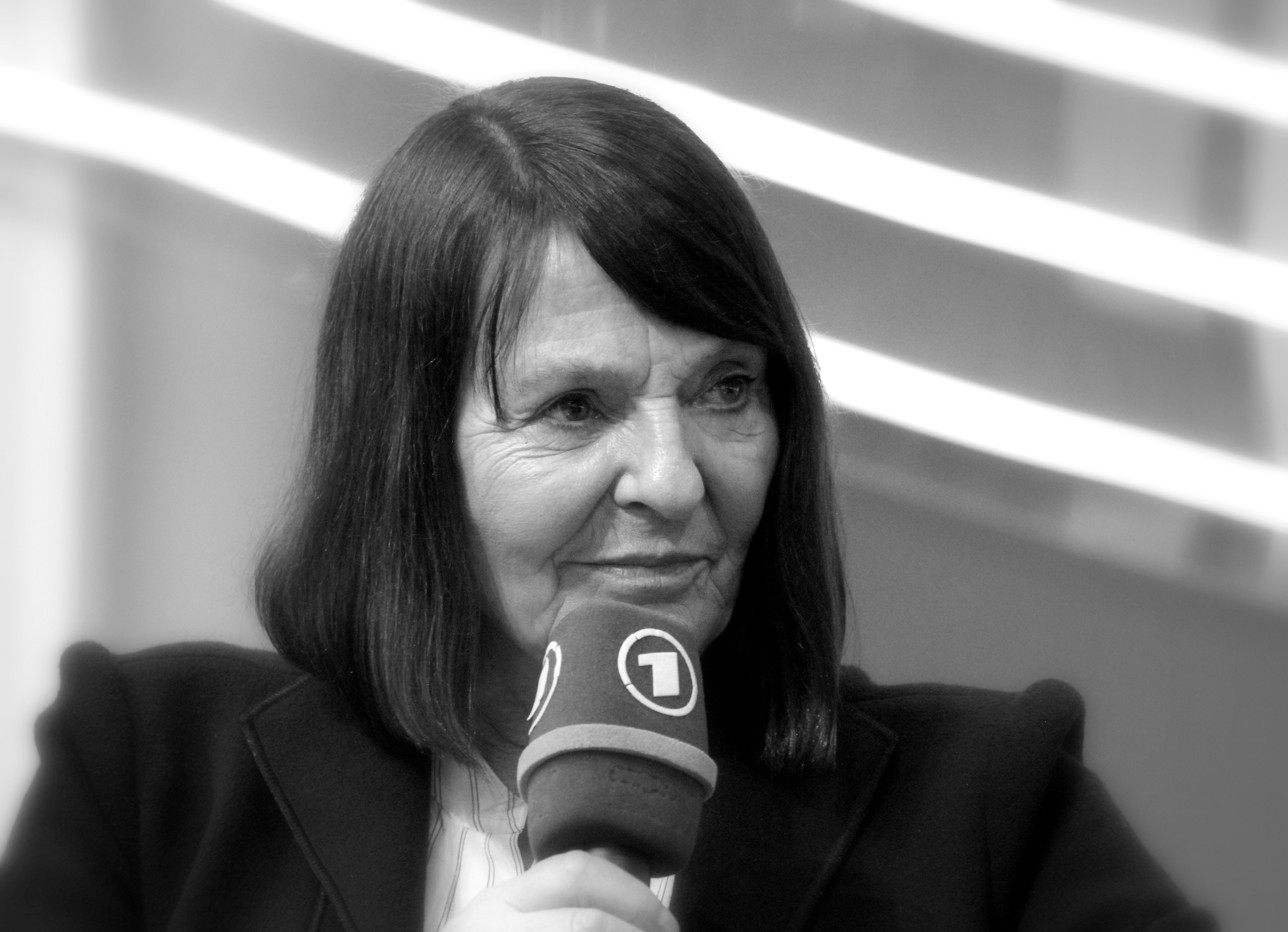
- Monika Maron (2018)
- Born: 3 June 1941 (age 85); Berlin
- Occupation: author

Monika Maron (born 3 June 1941 in Berlin) is a German author, formerly of the German Democratic Republic.

== Biography ==
She moved in 1951 from West to East Berlin with her stepfather, Karl Maron, the GDR Minister of the Interior. She studied theatre and spent time as a directing assistant and as a journalist. In the late 1970s, she began writing full-time in East Berlin. She left the GDR in 1988 with a three-year visa. After living in Hamburg, Germany, until 1992, she returned to a reunited Berlin, where she lives and writes. Her works deal to a large degree with confrontation with the past and explore the threats posed both by memory and isolation. Her prose is sparse, bleak, and lonely, conveying the sensitivity and desperation of her narrators.

Her published work exhibited increasingly conservative political views. In October 2020 she announced that her publishing house had cut ties with her.

== Awards ==
In 1992, she was distinguished with the renowned Kleist Prize, awarded annually to prominent German authors, and, in 2003, with the Friedrich Hölderlin Prize.

== Bibliography ==
- Flight of Ashes (Flugasche) (1981)
- Herr Aurich (Mr. Aurich) (1982)
- Das Mißverständnis (The misunderstanding) (1982)
- The Defector (Die Überläuferin) (1986)
- Stille Zeile Sechs (1991)
- Flight of Ashes (translated by David Newton Marinelli, London, Readers International (1986) ISBN 0-930523-22-9 ISBN 0-930523-23-7)
- Silent Close No. 6 (translated by David Newton Marinelli, London, Readers International (1993) ISBN 0-930523-93-8 ISBN 0-930523-94-6)
- Nach Massgabe meiner Begreifungskraft: Essays und Artikel (by the measure of my ability to comprehend: essays and articles) (1993)
- Animal Triste (1996)
- Pavel's Letters (Pawels Briefe) (1999)
- Endmoränen (end moraines) (2002)
- Quer über die Gleise (sideways across the tracks) (2002)
- Wie ich ein Buch nicht schreiben kann und es trotzdem versuche (how I cannot write a book but try to anyhow) (2005)
- Ach, Glück (oh, happiness/luck) (2007)
- Bitterfelder Bogen. Ein Bericht (Bitterfeld arch: a report) (2009)
- Zwei Brüder: Gedanken zur Einheit 1989–2009 (two brothers: thoughts on unity 1989–2009) (2010)
- Zwischenspiel (interlude) (2013)
- Munin oder Chaos im Kopf (2018), ISBN 978-3-10-048840-4.
- Krumme Gestalten, vom Wind gebissen (collection of essays, edited by Götz Kubitschek, 2020), ISBN 978-3-98-201316-9
- Artur Lanz (2020), ISBN 978-3-10-397405-8
- Immer noch freundlich, aber kaum noch geduldig. Tagebücher 1980–2021 (Still friendly, but barely patient anymore. Diaries 1980–2021) (2026) ISBN 978-3-45-502154-7
