= Minty (book) =

1996 book by Alan Schroeder and illustrated by Jerry Pinkeney

Minty: A Story of Young Harriet Tubman
- Front cover
- Author: Alan Schroeder
- Illustrator: Jerry Pinkney
- Language: English
- Genre: Children's literature, biography, picture book
- Published: 1996 (Dial Press)
- Publication place: United States
- Media type: Print (hardback)
- Pages: 32
- ISBN: 9780803718883
- OCLC: 32821613

Minty: A Story of Young Harriet Tubman is a 1996 children's picture book by Alan Schroeder and is illustrated by Jerry Pinkney. Released in 1996 by Dial Press, it is a fictionalized story of Harriet Tubman as a young girl.

== Reception ==
School Library Journal, in a review of Minty: A Story of Young Harriet Tubman, wrote "This beautifully illustrated and moving fictional story can be used to introduce Harriet Tubman and the injustice of slavery to young audiences." and noted "Pinkney's illustrations are outstanding, even when compared to his other fine work." Booklist found "The blend of fact and fiction is occasionally problematic (was she really planning escape at eight years old, or was that age chosen to suit the picture-book audience?), but kids will be moved by the picture of secret childhood rebellion in someone who grew up to lead hundreds to freedom."

Publishers Weekly gave a starred review and wrote "With color and feeling he [Schroeder] humanizes a historic figure, coaxing readers to imagine or research the rest of the story. Pinkney's (John Henry) full-bodied watercolors evoke a strong sense of time and place. .. A firm stepping stone toward discussions of slavery and U.S. history."

Minty: A Story of Young Harriet Tubman has also been reviewed by Kirkus Reviews, and The Horn Book Magazine.

== Awards ==
- 1996 CCBC Choice
- 1997 ALA Notable Children's Book
- 1997 Coretta Scott King Award illustrator - winner
- 1998 Kentucky Bluegrass Award 4-8 - winner
