= Elvira Natali =

Indonesian author and actress (born 1996)

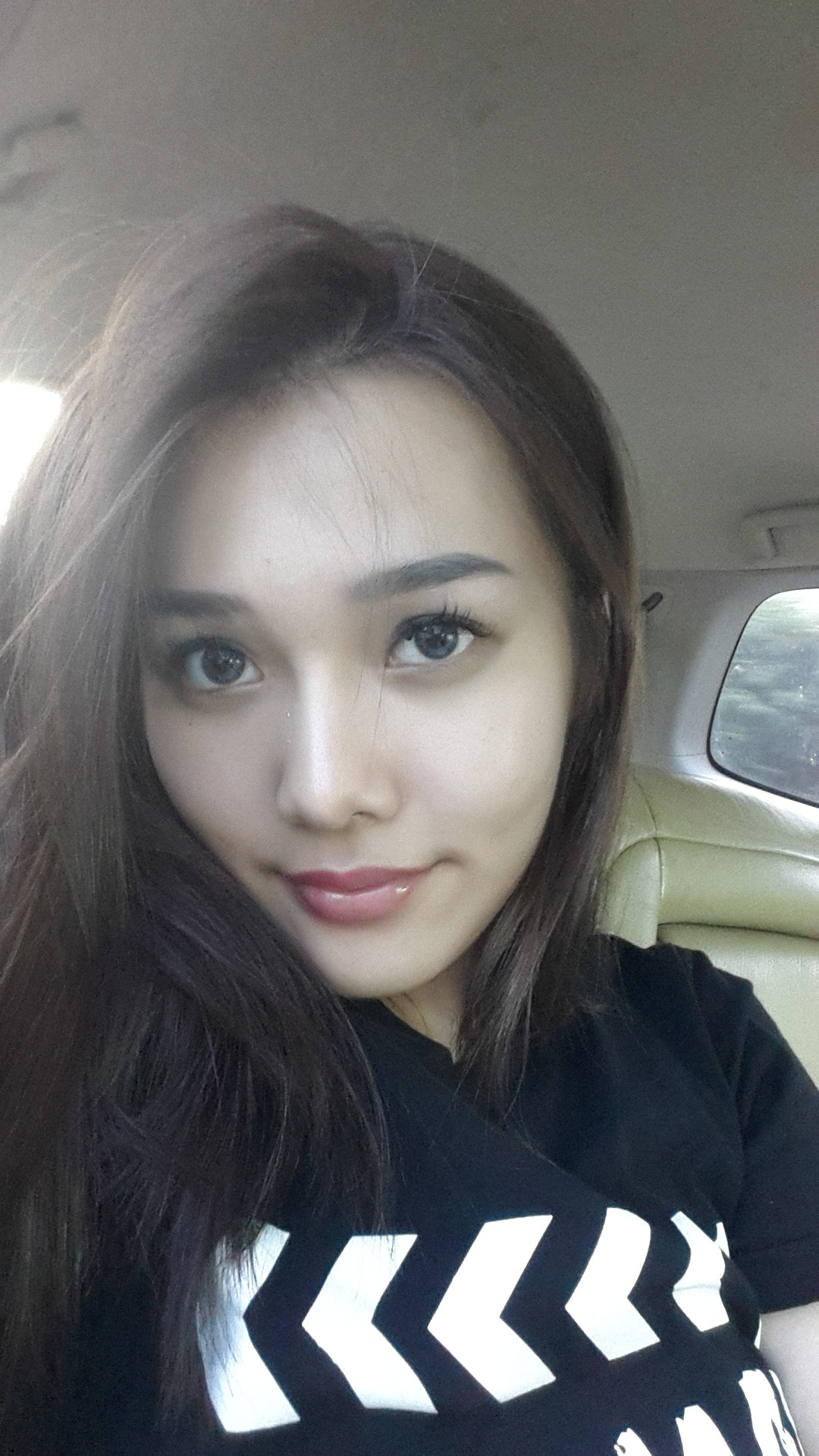

Background information
- Born: 25 December 1996 (age 29); Jakarta, Indonesia
- Occupations: Author, actress
- Years active: 2014–present

Elvira Natali (born 25 December 1996), is an Indonesian author, and actress. She is best known for her 2013 novel Janji Hati ('Heart Promises') and the film Janji Hati, in which she appeared as the leading actress.

== Early life ==
Natali was born to Frickvan and Christina Kurniati in Jakarta, Indonesia, on 25 December 1996. She has a brother Billy Marvel stayed in Melbourne. Both her father and mother are businessmen in Bandar Lampung, the capital of Lampung Province in Sumatra. Although born in Jakarta, she was raised in Bandar Lampung.

== Career ==
Natali started to write Janji Hati when she was still in high school. At first, the novel was rejected by PT Gramedia Pustaka Utama, the biggest publishing house in Indonesia. After revised it, she sent the manuscript back to Gramedia. And this time, they decided to publish it. Janji Hati was released in June 2013. Strong sales in the first three months after its released caught the attention of Rudi Soedjarwo, a prominent director and film producer in Indonesia. He then decided to produce the novel into a movie, with him as producer and Otoy Wiyoto as director. Recognizing Natali's acting talent, Soedjarwo cast her to play Amanda, the female main role, alongside Aliando Syarief who play the male main role, Dava. The film was released on 5 February 2015 and received favorable viewership among teenager audiences in theatres across Indonesia. In February 2014, she released her second novel Return. In May 2015, she was in the middle of production of her first gospel album and her second movie role in a film titled Kolong Langit ('Under the Sky').

== Filmography ==
- Janji Hati (2015)

== Written works ==
- Janji Hati (2013)
- Return (2014)
- Two Souls (2016)
- Never Looking Back (2016)
- Bluebell (2018)
- Mangata (2019)
