= Lost Laysen =

1996 novella by Margaret Mitchell

- 1996 first edition by Scribner.
- Author: Margaret Mitchell edited by Debra Freer
- Cover artist: Louise Fili (design); Mark Summers (art)
- Language: English
- Genre: Romance, novella
- Publisher: Scribner
- Publication date: 1996 (written 1916)
- Publication place: United States
- Media type: Print (Hardback)
- Pages: 127 pp
- ISBN: 0-684-82428-0
- OCLC: 34192604
- Dewey Decimal: 813/.52 20
- LC Class: PS3525.I972 L67 1996

Lost Laysen is a novella by Margaret Mitchell. Although it was written in 1916, it was not published until 1996.

Mitchell, who is best known as the author of Gone with the Wind, was believed to have only written one full book during her lifetime. However, when she was 15, she had written the manuscript to Lost Laysen—a romance set in the South Pacific. She gave the two notebooks containing the handwritten work to a suitor named Henry Love Angel, who kept the manuscript along with a number of letters Mitchell had sent him. Angel died in 1945, but Lost Laysen remained undiscovered until his son found the manuscript while preparing to donate the letters to the Road to Tara Museum.

Lost Laysen was first published in 1996 by the Scribner imprint of Simon & Schuster (ISBN 0684824280). Edited by Debra Freer, the book includes an extensive introduction telling the story of Mitchell and Angel's relationship, complete with photographs and reproductions of some of her letters.

The protagonists of the novella are presumably based on real people – heroine Courtenay Ross, although named after Mitchell's friend, has Mitchell's personality, and Billy Duncan is probably based on Henry Angel. The love triangle also foreshadows the one in Mitchell's more famous work, Gone with the Wind, where a man is in love with a woman he has no hope of winning over.
