= Skinny Melon and Me =

Children's novel

Skinny Melon And Me
- First edition
- Author: Jean Ure
- Illustrator: Chris Fisher, Peter Bailey
- Language: English
- Genre: Children's novel
- Published: 1996 (HarperCollins)
- Publication place: England
- Media type: Print (paperback)
- Pages: 189
- ISBN: 9780001856370
- OCLC: 43150607

Skinny Melon And Me is a 1996 children's novel by Jean Ure. It is mainly the diary of pre-teen Cherry, and includes observations of her mum, new stepfather, and best friend, Melanie Skinner (Skinny Melon).

== Publication history ==
- 1996, England, HarperCollins ISBN 9780001856370
- The Tutti-Frutti Collection, 2005, England, HarperCollins ISBN 9780007198627
- 2001, USA, Henry Holt ISBN 9780805063592
- 2011, England, HarperCollins ISBN 9780007424856

== Reception ==
A review by Children's Books Ireland of Skinny Melon And Me wrote "Cherry's voice is both funny and genuinely touching as the reader watches her emotionally mature over the course of the book.", and Kirkus Reviews called it "brightly chatty".

Skinny Melon And Me has also been reviewed by School Librarian, School Library Journal, Booklist, Publishers Weekly, Library Talk, and Horn Book Guides.
