= List of The Littlest Hobo episodes =

The Littlest Hobo is a Canadian television series based upon a 1958 well-known film of the same name directed by Charles R. Rondeau. The series first aired from 1963 until 1965 in syndication, and was revived for a popular second run on CTV, spanning six seasons, from October 11, 1979, until March 7, 1985. It starred an ownerless intelligent German Shepherd dog, the titular Hobo, who befriends and helps humans (portrayed by notable Canadian and Hollywood actors in celebrity guest appearances).

== Series overview ==
| Season | Episodes | Originally released | |
| Season | Episodes | First released | Last released |
|---|---|---|---|
| 1 | 24 | October 11, 1979 | May 20, 1980 |
| 2 | 18 | September 18, 1980 | April 9, 1981 |
| 3 | 18 | September 17, 1981 | March 11, 1982 |
| 4 | 18 | September 16, 1982 | March 24, 1983 |
| 5 | 18 | September 15, 1983 | March 15, 1984 |
| 6 | 18 | September 13, 1984 | March 7, 1985 |

== Episodes ==
=== Season 1 (1979–80) ===
| No. overall | No. in season | Title | Directed by | Written by | Original release date |
|---|---|---|---|---|---|
| 1 | 1 | "Smoke" | Allan Eastman | Paul W. Cooper | October 11, 1979 |
Hobo arrives in a small country town hit by a forest fire, where he helps rescue animals from the blaze and befriends forest ranger Ray Caldwell (Monte Markham). The local storekeeper (Gary Reineke), much to Ray's disgust, has started selling animal traps and poison to ward off the now homeless animals coming near the town. When a child eats poisoned meat left outside the store, and a thunderstorm prevents Ray from bringing the local doctor in by plane, Hobo is parachuted into the town with the antidote needed to save the child's life.
| 2 | 2 | "Manhunt: Part 1" | Allan Eastman | Norman Lessing | October 18, 1979 |
Hobo helps Tom Malone (Andrew Prine), an innocent man wrongfully accused of murder, escape the clutches of a sheriff and his bloodhounds.
| 3 | 3 | "Manhunt: Part 2" | Allan Eastman | Norman Lessing | October 25, 1979 |
Hobo manages to unearth vital evidence to prove Tom Malone's innocence.
| 4 | 4 | "The Defector" | Anthony Perris | Norman Lessing | November 1, 1979 |
Hobo helps rescue a Prima Ballerina who wants to defect from her Iron Curtain captors. Guest star: Paul Burke
| 5 | 5 | "Double Trouble" | Richard Gilbert | Dorrell McGowan & Stuart McGowan | November 8, 1979 |
With the help of his new friend, fellow gentleman of the road Ben Smith (Barry Morse), Hobo saves two draft horses destined for the fertilizer plant. The horses themselves prove to the local town that they are still useful when, where a tractor fails, they are instrumental in the rescue of a school bus full of children which is stranded in the middle of a fast-flowing river. (Note: This is a remake of an episode from the original 1963-1965 series, with the original version of the episode being titled "Pairs in Trouble")
| 6 | 6 | "Silent Witness" | Allan Eastman | Dorrell McGowan & Stuart McGowan | November 15, 1979 |
When Hobo witnesses a hit-and-run accident, he marshals evidence against the driver (Vic Morrow) and forces a confession. (Note: This is a remake of an episode from the original 1963-1965 series) Guest star: Michael Ironside
| 7 | 7 | "Target for Terror" | Allan Eastman | Norman Lessing | November 29, 1979 |
Two terrorists expect an aging Chief Justice (John Carradine) to pay ransom for the safe return of his son (John David Carson) and the son's girlfriend (Pam Williams).
| 8 | 8 | "Heritage" | Jan Darnley-Smith | Marvin Wald & Jack Jacobs | December 6, 1979 |
Hobo protects an elderly prospector from greedy land-grabbers. Guest star: Leon Ames
| 9 | 9 | "Little Girl Lost" | Richard Gilbert | Lew Hunter | December 13, 1979 |
Hobo befriends a three-year-old girl who goes missing in a sparsely-populated area. Hobo later uses his friendship with trucker Sam to return the girl to her overjoyed parents. Guest star: Lynda Day George
| 10 | 10 | "Boy on Wheels" | Stan Olsen | Marvin Wald & Jack Jacobs | December 20, 1979 |
Hobo encourages a paraplegic boy to enter a Frisbee-throwing contest to the dismay of the youth's overly-protective widowed father, who hates dogs because his driving at excessive speed and swerving to avoid a stray dog (who closely resembled Hobo) led to the car crash which killed his wife and left his son paralyzed. When Hobo saves the boy's life, the father finally sees the light. This episode also featured a young Mike Myers as the paralyzed boy's friend, Tommy. Guest star: Clarence Williams III
| 11 | 11 | "Stand In" | Stan Olsen | Roy Freeman | December 27, 1979 |
Harry (Alan Hale Jr.), a night watchman at an electronics firm, and his German shepherd Sarge are framed for the theft of top-secret equipment.
| 12 | 12 | "Second Chance" | Allan Eastman | Wallace Bennett | January 3, 1980 |
An ex-convict is framed for drug smuggling and with help from Ryan McCallum (played by a young Rob McLeavy) Hobo is able to clear the ex-convicts name but all the drugs go missing. Guest star: Michael Cole
| 13 | 13 | "Big Al and Sam Strawberry" | Jan Darnley-Smith | William Keys | January 10, 1980 |
A struggling artist considers an illegal sale to clear Mafia debts. Guest star: Sheldon Leonard
| 14 | 14 | "Give My Regards to Broadway" | Jan Darnley-Smith | Barbara Holleran | January 31, 1980 |
Hobo befriends a down and out ex-vaudevillian who has been shoplifting with every intent to pay it back when she becomes a star again. Guest star: Rosemary Radcliffe
| 15 | 15 | "The Last Job" | Allan Eastman | Gordon Ruttan | February 7, 1980 |
Hobo helps an ex-convict pursue an honest life style. Guest star: Alan McRae
| 16 | 16 | "Snapshot" | Jan Darnley-Smith | John C.W. Saxon | February 28, 1980 |
Hobo helps a young boy prove to his mother that you don't have to play a rough sport like hockey to have courage. Guest star: Mark Polley
| 17 | 17 | "Million Dollar Fur Heist" | Allan Eastman | Norman Lessing | March 6, 1980 |
Hobo helps rescue two kidnapped victims and in the process recovers a million dollars' worth of stolen furs. Guest star: Abe Vigoda
| 18 | 18 | "Diamonds Are a Dog's Best Friend" | Allan Eastman | Wallace Bennett | March 13, 1980 |
A magician is accused of making an heirloom disappear. Guest star: Patrick Macnee
| 19 | 19 | "Romiet and Julio" | Jan Darnley-Smith | William J. Keenan | March 20, 1980 |
Because of their parents' objections, a young couple's marriage plans appear doomed, until Hobo comes to the rescue. Guest star: Leslie Nielsen, Anne Francis
| 20 | 20 | "Escape" | Allan Eastman | Barbara Holleran | March 27, 1980 |
Hobo mans a disco control panel and helps the victim of an underworld frame-up. Guest star: Saul Rubinek
| 21 | 21 | "Guardian Angel" | Stan Olsen | Paul W. Cooper | April 3, 1980 |
When a distraught East European woman named Ines, who is in Canada illegally, abandons her baby daughter Maria on the steps of a church, Hobo appoints himself guardian of the child – eventually managing to reunite mother and child. Guest star: Nehemiah Persoff
| 22 | 22 | "The Pied Piper" | Allan Eastman | Unknown | April 10, 1980 |
Hobo and Dan Mooney (Jack Gilford), the janitor of a children's hospital, manage to help an emotionally withdrawn boy.
| 23 | 23 | "Willie and Kate" | Jan Darnley-Smith | Unknown | May 15, 1980 |
Hobo travels with Willy (Gary Merrill), a tramp, and Kate, a runaway little girl, who are hitchhiking across the country to California, where they plan to open up an orange juice stand.
| 24 | 24 | "The Further Adventures of Willie and Kate" | Jan Darnley-Smith | Unknown | May 22, 1980 |
Following on from the previous episode, Hobo continues his travels with Willy and Kate. But when the authorities recapture Kate, Willy tries to rescue her with unexpected results.

=== Season 2 (1980-81) ===
| No. overall | No. in season | Title | Original release date |
|---|---|---|---|
| 25 | 1 | "The Balloonist" | September 18, 1980 |
Hobo comes to the rescue of a downed balloonist. (Note: Keenan Wynn had previously guest starred in an episode from the original 1963–1965 series). Guest star: Keenan Wynn (Gus Appleton)
| 26 | 2 | "Duddleman and the Diamond Ring" | September 25, 1980 |
Hobo becomes acquainted with a bumbling pawn-broker named Duddleman (Henry Jones).
| 27 | 3 | "Guinea Pig" | October 2, 1980 |
Poisoned water endangers an animal research institute. Guest star: Melody Ryane (Sarah)
| 28 | 4 | "Trapper" | October 9, 1980 |
Hobo must stop a ruthless trapper who still foolishly uses inhumane steel traps on animals. Guest star: John Vernon (Sam Burrows)
| 29 | 5 | "The Pearls" | October 23, 1980 |
Hobo aids a captain (Scott Brady) whose crew mutinied and stole pearls.
| 30 | 6 | "Carnival of Fear" | October 30, 1980 |
Hobo stalks an ominous carnival patron. Guest star: Gale Garnett (Margie/Madame Sybil)
| 31 | 7 | "Mystery at the Zoo" | November 6, 1980 |
Hobo finds himself in the middle of a life-and-death situation when he joins a young newswoman and her cameraman in an investigation of "animal-snatching". Guest star: Carol Lynley (June Wilson)
| 32 | 8 | "Sailing Away" | November 13, 1980 |
Hobo rescues a teen from danger on her father's boat. Guest star: Martin Milner (Don Porter)
| 33 | 9 | "The Hunt" | November 20, 1980 |
Hobo comes to the aid of a pretty young groom at the Fox Hunt Club who is being framed for theft. Nicholas Campbell appears as the groom's love interest, who also is the son of the Fox Hunt Club president. Guest star: Cameron Mitchell (Carl)
| 34 | 10 | "Fast Freddie" | November 27, 1980 |
A con man tries to cheat wealthy small-town residents. Guest star: Morey Amsterdam (Freddie Tewksbury)
| 35 | 11 | "Licence to Steal" | December 4, 1980 |
The life of a scrapyard foreman's son is saved when Hobo intervenes. Guest star: Clifton Davis (Phil McLean)
| 36 | 12 | "Portrait of Danger" | December 11, 1980 |
When a young photographer accidentally takes an action picture of a bank robbery, Hobo tries to persuade him to turn it over to the police. When instead he decides to wait and sell the shot to the papers, Hobo has to protect him from his own bad judgement and angry reprisals from the robbers themselves. Guest star: James Stephens (Kevin Wheeler)
| 37 | 13 | "Ghost Rig" | December 18, 1980 |
Hobo helps find a hijacked truckload of diamonds. (Note: Henry Gibson had previously guest starred in an episode from the original 1963–1965 series). Guest star: Henry Gibson (Jeffrey Farley)
| 38 | 14 | "Here's Joey Jackson" | January 22, 1981 |
When famous television personality Joey Jackson (Jack Carter) finds himself being blackmailed over a secret he has harboured all his life, Hobo becomes the instrument to foil the blackmail plot and bring Joey to the realization that he must face his past squarely – no matter the consequences.
| 39 | 15 | "Runaway" | February 12, 1981 |
Hobo hops on board a train and befriends an old railroad bum and a runaway boy. Guest star: DeForest Kelley (Professor Hal Schaffer)
| 40 | 16 | "East Side Angels" | February 26, 1981 |
Hobo befriends a young basketball player who is having problems being accepted by his teammates. Guest star: Chris Makepeace (Willie), Nerene Virgin (Miss Waston)
| 41 | 17 | "Mystique" | March 5, 1981 |
An unethical hypnotist influences a model's behavior. Guest star: John Evans (Dr. Henshaw)
| 42 | 18 | "The Trail of No Return" | April 9, 1981 |
Hobo turns health inspector when botulism is discovered at a campground. Guest star: James MacArthur (Jim Haley)

=== Season 3 (1981–82) ===
| No. overall | No. in season | Title | Directed by | Written by | Original release date |
|---|---|---|---|---|---|
| 43 | 1 | "Photo Finish" | Joseph L. Scanlan | Richard Zelniker | September 17, 1981 |
Hobo helps a jockey whose chances of winning her first big race are threatened by a racing syndicate.
| 44 | 2 | "The Secret of Red Hill" | Joseph L. Scanlan | Christine Foster | September 24, 1981 |
Hobo helps a reporter (Susan Hogan) in her quest to track down a sasquatch-like creature sighted near a small town.
| 45 | 3 | "Wolf Hunt" | Allan Eastman | Martin Lager | October 1, 1981 |
Hobo runs into the path of a father (John Ireland) and two sons, out hunting for wolf bounty, and is himself mistaken for a wolf. Real-life brothers Jeff and Michael Wincott play the sons.
| 46 | 4 | "The Day of the Fugitive" | Joseph L. Scanlan | Christine Foster | October 8, 1981 |
A merchant seaman, Dr. Cowper (Gerard Parkes), suspected of having the plague, jumps ship in a large city. Only Hobo knows where the man is and must conduct him to safety despite the fact that the dog's own life is in danger and he is being hunted as a fugitive, too.
| 47 | 5 | "Suspect" | Allan Eastman | Unknown | October 29, 1981 |
Hobo comes upon the scene of what appears to be a boating accident at a hunting club, and discovers evidence which indicates foul play. When the police arrive, however, an innocent man is accused and only Hobo can bring the authorities the one essential piece of evidence which forces the real culprit to tip his hand.
| 48 | 6 | "War Games" | Allan Eastman | Unknown | November 5, 1981 |
Hobo sees a teenage girl cutting across a military practice zone and alerts a young recruit to her danger. All three soon find themselves caught in the middle of a realistic exercise and only Hobo knows that the young peoples' hiding place is itself a key target in the manoeuvres.
| 49 | 7 | "The Hero" | Joseph L. Scanlan | Unknown | November 12, 1981 |
Hobo meets Joey (Edward Albert), a simple young man who is disregarded and picked on by most of the community. When Joey stumbles on a dognapping scam, only Hobo knows he is telling the truth, and can help Joey grow in self-respect by solving a real crime.
| 50 | 8 | "Hidden Room" | Mario Azzopardi | Charles Northcote | November 19, 1981 |
Hobo comes across an old farmhouse where a young mute girl and her father are being blackmailed into conducting fake seances. By cleverly investigating and manipulating the mechanics of the ruse, Hobo is able to break the blackmailers' (Louis Del Grande and Jayne Eastwood) hold, stop the fraud, and free the father and daughter.
| 51 | 9 | "Fussin' & Fightin'" | Allan Eastman | Barbara Holleran | November 26, 1981 |
A rival tries to have a harmonica player fired.
| 52 | 10 | "The Locket" | Joseph L. Scanlan | Simon Christopher Dew | December 3, 1981 |
Hobo goes to great lengths to deliver a locket to an old man's granddaughter.
| 53 | 11 | "Airport" | Mario Azzopardi | Unknown | December 10, 1981 |
Hobo foils sabotage at a courier service.
| 54 | 12 | "Music Box" | Mario Azzopardi, Allan Eastman | Unknown | December 24, 1981 |
Ballerina Karen Kain makes her television acting debut in this touching episode about a little girl who lives more and more in a fantasy world because her mother, an ex-ballerina, refuses to let her dance.
| 55 | 13 | "Mail Order Bride" | Joseph L. Scanlan | Martin Lager | January 21, 1982 |
A farmer and his mail-order bride seem incompatible. Guest star: Simon Oakland
| 56 | 14 | "The Clown" | Mario Azzopardi | Allan Cullimore | January 28, 1982 |
Hobo befriends a lonely clown (Donald O'Connor).
| 57 | 15 | "Once Upon a Tyme" | Mario Azzopardi | Unknown | February 4, 1982 |
Hobo plays Cupid when he joins a travelling troupe of actors and finds out that one of the actors has been jilted by his leading lady. Guest star: Geraint Wyn Davies.
| 58 | 16 | "A Special Friend" | Joseph L. Scanlan | Unknown | February 25, 1982 |
On the docks. Hobo meets a very special friend who believes he can understand what animals are thinking. His sensitivity makes him a perfect partner for the dog as the pair matches wits with a warehouse full of gold thieves.
| 59 | 17 | "Forget Me Not" | Mario Azzopardi | Gerard Fournier | March 4, 1982 |
When Hobo spots a disoriented woman, with amnesia, aimlessly wandering into a large amusement park (Canada's Wonderland), he finds his own way in and protects her from serious physical danger while alerting the security and bringing her medical help. Guest star: Joanna Pettet
| 60 | 18 | "Rex Badger P.I." | Allan Eastman | Christine Foster & Charles Northcote | March 11, 1982 |
Hobo joins forces with inept private eye Rex Badger (Michael Kirby), who perfected his style watching old movies. As Badger plods through a series of comic clues, Hobo keeps several steps ahead of him and enables him to finally put the pieces together and wind up with the credit.

=== Season 4 (1982-83) ===
| No. overall | No. in season | Title | Original release date |
|---|---|---|---|
| 61 | 1 | "Napoleon" | September 16, 1982 |
Hobo apprehends cattle rustlers preying on a rancher. Guest star: Chris Donnan (Dixie Seatle)
| 62 | 2 | "Home Free" | September 23, 1982 |
Hobo aids a detention-home runaway. Guest star: Jennifer Jewison (Laura Clark)
| 63 | 3 | "Back to Nature" | September 30, 1982 |
Hobo aids a woman in labour and her injured husband. A similar story was broadcast during the show's 1963-65 run. Guest star: Peter Hanlon (Mick Reid)
| 64 | 4 | "The Imaginative Invalid" | October 7, 1982 |
A hypochondriac tests her relatives' loyalty. Guest star: Ruth Springford (Gwyn MacGibbon)
| 65 | 5 | "Finders Keepers" | October 14, 1982 |
Two boys compete for Hobo's company. Guest star: Richard Yearwood (Danny McLean)
| 66 | 6 | "Happy Birthday, Mom" | October 21, 1982 |
Hobo brings together two teenage brothers who are feuding when both enter a bike race hoping to win money to buy their mother a gift. Guest star: Mark Polley (David)
| 67 | 7 | "The Spirit of Thunder Rock (part 1)" | October 28, 1982 |
A geologist's daughter discovers treasure. Hobo helps the family survive an earthquake. Guest star: Ted Follows (Tony Kendall)
| 68 | 8 | "The Spirit of Thunder Rock (part 2)" | November 4, 1982 |
Guest star: Megan Follows (Marti Kendall)
| 69 | 9 | "The Spirit of Thunder Rock (part 3)" | November 11, 1982 |
Guest star: August Schellenberg (Walter Henig)
| 70 | 10 | "Rabies" | November 18, 1982 |
Hobo tries to keep a rabid raccoon from coming into contact with anyone while attempting to alert authorities to its whereabouts. Guest star: Barbara Kyle (Dr. Edmunds)
| 71 | 11 | "Day for Fright" | November 25, 1982 |
Hobo happens upon a real crime on a movie set. Guest star: David Calderisi (Maurice Driscoll)
| 72 | 12 | "Trooper" | December 2, 1982 |
Hobo finds an abandoned baby in an evacuated town. Based on a train derailment and subsequent mass evacuation at Mississauga in November 1979. Guest star: Jonathan Welsh (Stan)
| 73 | 13 | "The Loneliest Day of the Week" | January 27, 1983 |
Hobo helps spur romance between a widow and a bachelor. Guest star: Doris Petrie (Lily Harcroft)
| 74 | 14 | "Double Vision" | February 3, 1983 |
A traveling artist who resembles a small town's corrupt mayor (both played by Leslie Yeo) arrives for a visit at the same time Hobo does.
| 75 | 15 | "Winner Take All" | February 10, 1983 |
Hobo's friend gets a winning lottery ticket. Guest star: Jan Filips (Milos)
| 76 | 16 | "Small Pleasures" | March 3, 1983 |
Hobo acts to foil two ex-cons intent on stealing a valuable item secreted in a miniature town unbeknownst to the tiny town's current owner. Guest star: Daniel Buccos (Gordon Jacks)
| 77 | 17 | "The Five Labours of Hercules (part 1)" | March 17, 1983 |
Hobo helps a young handicapped boy start his own business. Guest star: Hadley Kay (Nathaniel)
| 78 | 18 | "The Five Labours of Hercules (part 2)" | March 24, 1983 |
Guest star: Hadley Kay (Nathaniel)

=== Season 5 (1983-84) ===
| No. overall | No. in season | Title | Original release date |
|---|---|---|---|
| 79 | 1 | "Rookie" | September 15, 1983 |
Fearing an impending operation, a youth runs away. Guest star: Charles Kerr (Ted)
| 80 | 2 | "Scavenger Hunt (part 1)" | September 22, 1983 |
Hobo is sought in a fraternity scavenger hunt. Guest star: Geraint Wyn Davies (Adam Coulter)
| 81 | 3 | "Scavenger Hunt (part 2)" | September 29, 1983 |
Guest star: Pam Hyatt (Mrs. Coulter)
| 82 | 4 | "Second Sight" | October 6, 1983 |
Hobo helps a blind teenager learn his capabilities. Guest star: Peter Spence (David Leonard)
| 83 | 5 | "Trucker" | October 13, 1983 |
A trucker considers illegal work to keep his rig. Guest star: Richard Donat (Mac Devlin)
| 84 | 6 | "Born to Run" | October 20, 1983 |
A champion whippet is stolen prior to a big lure coursing race. Guest star: Michael J. Reynolds [credited as Michael Reynolds] (Philip)
| 85 | 7 | "Tempest Probe" | October 27, 1983 |
A criminal steals and tries to sell a secret laser. Guest star: Christopher Britton (Prospero)
| 86 | 8 | "Lumberjacks" | November 3, 1983 |
A gambler plans to sabotage a lumberjack contest. Guest star: Lawrence Dane (Alistair McLeod) Jeff Wincott (Barry McLeod)
| 87 | 9 | "Passage" | November 10, 1983 |
Hobo thwarts a hunter stalking peregrine falcons. Guest star: Al Waxman (Vernie Davis)
| 88 | 10 | "Sartech (part 1)" | November 17, 1983 |
Hobo witnesses a wilderness plane crash and aids the victims. Guest star: Don Granberry (Sam)
| 89 | 11 | "Sartech (part 2)" | December 1, 1983 |
Guest star: Don Granberry (Sam)
| 90 | 12 | "Dragonslayer" | January 19, 1984 |
Hobo protects four youths engaged in a deadly game. Guest star: Simon Craig ("Zim Fahr")
| 91 | 13 | "The Genesis Tapes (part 1)" | January 26, 1984 January 26, 1984 |
Hobo is theorized to be a new species of dog by a scientist and a reporter who attempt to capture him to study him. (Note: Both Part 1 & 2 feature clips from past episodes, including some clips from the original 1963-1965 version and even the 1958 film) Guest star: Alan Scarfe (Dr. Richard Kellerman)
| 92 | 14 | "The Genesis Tapes (part 2)" | February 2, 1984 |
Guest star: Candace O'Connor (Trish Kellerman)
| 93 | 15 | "Ghost Station" | February 23, 1984 |
Hobo participates in a subway manhunt. Guest star: Malcolm Stewart (Ken)
| 94 | 16 | "Indian Summer" | March 1, 1984 |
Hobo aids elderly people fleeing a retirement home. Guest star: Robert Christie (Gordon)
| 95 | 17 | "Applejack" | March 8, 1984 |
Bootleggers threaten a migrant who could expose them. Guest star: Eric Murphy (Yves Boisvert)
| 96 | 18 | "Sheep in Wolf's Clothing" | March 15, 1984 |
Hobo is mistaken for a sheep-killing wolf. Guest star: Stephen Markle (Bryce Meyer)

=== Season 6 (1984-85) ===
| No. overall | No. in season | Title | Original release date |
|---|---|---|---|
| 97 | 1 | "Second Best" | September 13, 1984 |
Schoolmates bully a country boy. Guest star: Shane O'Brien (Morgan Emery)
| 98 | 2 | "Three Monkeys of Bah Roghar (part 1)" | September 20, 1984 |
Hobo solves the theft of priceless statues. Guest star: Graham Batchelor (Thurber Best)
| 99 | 3 | "Three Monkeys of Bah Roghar (part 2)" | September 27, 1984 |
Guest star: Graham Batchelor (Thurber Best)
| 100 | 4 | "Rodeo" | October 4, 1984 |
A rodeo star fears getting back in the saddle. Guest star: August Schellenberg (Stoney Hill)
| 101 | 5 | "One Door Closes" | October 11, 1984 |
Hobo helps a man adjust to life in a wheelchair. Guest star: Al Waxman (Vic Carrano)
| 102 | 6 | "Lucky" | October 18, 1984 |
Hobo helps a stuntman get work and confidence. Guest star: Michael Hogan (Lucky)
| 103 | 7 | "Arrivederci Roma" | October 25, 1984 |
A young model-airplane pilot competes with adults. Guest star: Richard Yearwood (Shawn Turner)
| 104 | 8 | "The Good Shepherd" | November 1, 1984 |
Hobo aids a financially troubled church. Guest star: Harvey Atkin (Neiderhoff)
| 105 | 9 | "Matchmaker" | November 8, 1984 |
Tennis pro Sandy McCann (Carling Basset) helps Hobo prevent the breakup of a young couple. (Note: Carling Bassett's real-life father, John F. Bassett, makes a cameo appearance in the episode playing Sandy's father).
| 106 | 10 | "Firehorse (part 1)" | November 15, 1984 |
Hobo rescues people from a burning factory. Guest star: Neil Dainard (Jack Thornton)
| 107 | 11 | "Firehorse (part 2)" | November 22, 1984 |
Guest star: Neil Dainard (Jack Thornton)
| 108 | 12 | "Prodigal Son" | November 29, 1984 |
Hobo reveals an imposter in a small religious community. Guest star: Peter Dvorsky (Sean Armstrong)
| 109 | 13 | "Torque" | January 31, 1985 |
A kart driver seeks a spot on a racing team. Guest star: Jessica Steen (Torque), Paul Tracy
| 110 | 14 | "Small Change" | February 7, 1985 |
A mime and a deaf boy help Hobo prevent a robbery. Guest star: Edward Leefe (Terry)
| 111 | 15 | "Voyageurs (part 1)" | February 14, 1985 |
A family is trapped on a deserted island. Themes include cold war tensions and the early stages of the digital age. Guest star: Robin Ward (Ian Farrell)
| 112 | 16 | "Voyageurs (part 2)" | February 21, 1985 |
Guest star: Susan Hogan (Meg Farrell)
| 113 | 17 | "Liar, Liar" | February 28, 1985 |
Hobo witnesses a boy committing fraud. Guest star: Todd Woodcroft (Richie McKinley)
| 114 | 18 | "Pandora" | March 7, 1985 |
Hobo finds an undetonated World War II bomb. Guest star: David Glyn-Jones (Sgt. Jocky White)
