= The Defector (Maron novel) =

Novel by Monika Maron

Die Überläuferin (English: The Defector) is a 1986 German-language novel by Monika Maron. In this, her second novel, the author questions the status of the individual in GDR society, making a critique of the state's ideological system. The heroine struggles with the oppressing social norms of society and its male-dominated, supposedly scientific, spirit.
