= The Defectors =

Danish rock band

- Origin: Aarhus, Denmark
- Genres: Garage rock, garage punk, psychobilly, rock and roll
- Years active: 1997–present
- Labels: E.S.P. Recordings, Bad Afro, No Fun
- Members: Mort Harder; Nicolai Hjalte; Jess Bonde; Martin Budde; Rune Pedersen
- Website: thedefectors.com

The Defectors are a Danish rock band originating from Aarhus, Denmark, formed in 1997. Originally consisting of members Mort Harder, Mik Stegger, Jonas Jørgensen, Martin Budde and Torben Skovgaard, the band cites the 1960s garage rock and early formation of punk as its main influences. The band maintains this through its work, typically being classified as either a garage rock or punk revival band.

== History ==
The band formed in the members' hometown of Aarhus, Denmark in 1997, under the original moniker of Thee Fuzz Arts. The band then intended to switch its name to The Persuaders, but upon finding that name to be taken, finally settled on The Defectors in 1998. There was a lengthy delay in getting the band's music to the North American audience, however, a deal was soon arranged. Shortly thereafter, the band, released its first full-length album with Let Me — on ESP Recordings of Kick Music, Denmark. The Defectors have gone on to release four more albums, the most recent being Bruised and Satisfied on Bad Afro Records in March 2007.

== Discography ==
- Let Me... (ESP 992-2/1, 2002)
- Baby Gimme Love! (2003)
- Live at Gutter Island (2004)
- Turn Me On! (2006)
- Bruised and Satisfied (2007)
- Bloody Bloody Mary (7" split single, 2009)
- Takin' Out The Trash (2009)
