= Jean Ure =

English children's author

Jean Ure (born 1 January 1943) is an English children's author. Her first book, Dance For Two (1960), was published by John Goodchild Publishers when she was sixteen and still at school. Since then, she has published over 170 children's books, including the stories of Frankie Foster. She was married to Leonard Gregory until his death in 2020. She lives in Croydon, Surrey.

== Biography ==
Jean Ure was born and brought up in a suburb of London and attended school in Croydon. She wrote her first book when she was six years old and had her first book, Dance For Two published when she was sixteen. Having decided to make a career as a writer, she ran away from school and spent the next few years in a variety of jobs just to make a living. She waited tables, scrubbed floors, sold bread at Woolworths, did "...a bit of nursing, a bit of translating, a bit of cooking..." before enrolling to study drama at the Webber-Douglas Academy of Dramatic Art (1965–68). She married a fellow student, Leonard Gregory, in 1967.

She lives in a 300-year-old house in Croydon, south of London. Her most famous novel is the Point Crime novel Dance with Death. Her other novels include Plague 99, After the Plague (previously published as "Come Lucky April"), Big Tom, Family Fan Club and Shrinking Violet as well as the fantasy novel The Wizard In the Woods. Jean has now become very popular with female teenage readers around Britain with novels such as Shrinking Violet, Family Fan Club and Passion Flower, as well as many other novels.

Ure's novel, Secret Meeting, publicises the danger of chat rooms and the internet. Another of her novels, Is Anybody There? talks about the danger of going off with strangers. In a 2006 survey in UK girls magazine Mizz, they noted that Jean Ure, Jacqueline Wilson and J. K. Rowling were the most famous female authors in the United Kingdom. Ure has no children and lives with many animals in her London home. She says that writing her stories on her computer, drives her 'bonkers'.

Ure has written several books for teenage girls about boys, such as 'Love and Kisses' which is about a sensible girl who falls for an unsuitable boy and starts lying to her parents in order to see him. Also, many of her books deal with divorce, such as Passion Flower, a book about two girls who are sent to stay with their dad for the summer holidays.

Ure also translated novels of World War II writer Sven Hassel from his Danish to English.

== Bibliography ==
- Dance for Two (children's book, published while at
- See You Thursday (1980)
- A Proper Little Nooryeff (1981)
- Hi There, Supermouse (1943)
- After Thursday (1984)
- You Win Some, You Lose Some (1984)
- If it weren't for Sebastian... (1984)
- Nicola Mimosa (1985)
- One Green Leaf (1987)
- The trouble with Vanessa (1988)
- There's always Dannie (1989)
- Say Goodbye (1989)
- Plague 99 (1989, Lancs Book Award 1990)
- The Wizard in the Woods (1990)
- The Wizard in Wonderland (1991)
- The Children Next Door(1994)
- The Wizard and the Witch (1995)
- Skinny Melon and Me (1996)
- Becky Bananas (1997)
- Whistle and I'll Come (1997, Stockton Children's Book Award)
- Just 16 (1999)
- Fruit and Nutcase (1999)
- Secret Life of Sally Tomato (Later renamed The Kissing Game) (2000)
- A twist in Time (2000)
- Boys on the Brain (2001)
- Shrinking Violet (2014)
- Pumpkin Pie (2002)
- Bad Alice (2003)
- Passion Flower (2003)
- Secret Meeting (2004)
- Is Anybody There? (2004)
- Sugar and Spice (2005)
- Star Crazy Me! (2008)
- Fortune Cookie (2009)
- Love and Kisses (2009)
- Ice-lolly (2010)
- Frankie Foster - Fizzy Pop (2011)
- Frankie Foster - Pick n' Mix (2011)
- Frankie Foster - Freaks Out (20ñ2)
- Lemonade Sky (2012)
- Just Peachy (2013)
- Secrets and Dreams (2015)
- Strawberry Crush (2016)
