= Leonardo da Vinci (Stanley book) =

1996 book by Diane Stanley

- Author: Diane Stanley
- Illustrator: Diane Stanley
- Language: English
- Subject: Children's non-fiction literature, Biography, Renaissance, Leonardo da Vinci
- Published: 1996 (Morrow Junior Books)
- Publication place: US
- Media type: Print (hardback)
- Pages: 44 (unpaginated)
- ISBN: 9780613300032
- OCLC: 32893772

Leonardo da Vinci is a 1996 children's biography by Diane Stanley. The book looks at Leonardo's life and accomplishments.

== Reception ==
A Booklist review of Leonardo da Vinci called it "[a]n impressive tribute to a man whose curiosity and artistic imagination amazed the world, then and now" and the School Library Journal called it "[a] gorgeous biography". The Horn Book Magazine wrote that "the real emphasis is on [Leonardo's] work ... making this less a complete biography than a celebration of his inquiring spirit and creative vision", and Library Media Connection, the magazine of Libraries Unlimited, remarked that "[d]etailed illustrations and sophisticated vocabulary and thought concepts will delight the browser, while the detailed timeline and excellent bibliography including primary sources will be useful to the researcher". In the opinion of Kirkus Reviews, "[m]ore than Leonardo's genius, this book captures the caprice time and fate plays on even the gifted, so that what readers finally admire in Leonardo are not his creations, but his ideas".

Publishers Weekly called the book Stanley's "most stunning pictorial biography to date", writing that "[w]hile her text is thoroughly intriguing, even more impressive is the artistic challenge Stanley takes on and triumphantly meets"; it concluded: "[a] virtuosic work." Common Sense Media wrote that "Diane Stanley's Leonardo da Vinci is every parent's answer to the problem of dry, boring biographies".

== Awards and nominations ==
- 1996: Orbis Pictus – winner
- 1997: Boston Globe–Horn Book Award – honor
