= Mary Rosenblum =

American author (1952–2018)

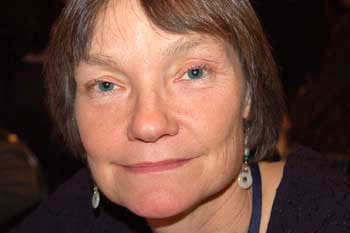
- Mary Rosenblum in 2006
- Born: Mary Freeman; June 27, 1952; Levittown, New York, U.S.
- Died: March 11, 2018 (aged 65); La Center, Washington, U.S.
- Education: Reed College; Clarion West Writers Workshop

Mary Rosenblum (born Mary Freeman; June 27, 1952 – March 11, 2018) was an American science fiction and mystery author.

== Biography ==
Rosenblum was born in Levittown, New York and grew up in Allison Park, Pennsylvania. She earned a biology degree from Reed College in Oregon. Rosenblum attended the Clarion West Writers Workshop in 1988.

Her first story came out in 1990 and her first novel in 1993. Her career began in, and largely returned to, science fiction. However, from 1999 to 2002 she wrote the "Gardening Mysteries" novel series under the name "Mary Freeman." Her gardening-involved mystery novels are said to be significantly different from her science fiction and so her two followings do not necessarily overlap. In 1994, she won the Compton Crook Award for Best First Novel for the novel, The Drylands. In 2009 she won the Sidewise Award for Alternate History Short Form for her story, "Sacrifice."

Rosenblum was also an accomplished cheesemaker who taught the craft at selected workshops.

At the age of 57, Rosenblum earned her airman certificate. Residing in Oregon, she was one of only 10% of pilots in that state who are female.

== Death ==
Rosenblum died on March 11, 2018, when the single-engine plane she was piloting crashed near an airfield south of La Center, Washington.

== Bibliography ==
=== Novels ===
- The Drylands (1993)
- Chimera (1993)
- The Stone Garden (1994)
- Devil's Trumpet (1999) writing as Mary Freeman
- Deadly Nightshade (1999) writing as Mary Freeman
- Bleeding Heart (2000) writing as Mary Freeman
- Garden View (2002) writing as Mary Freeman
- Water Rites (2006)
- Horizons (2007)

=== Collections ===
- Synthesis & Other Virtual Realities (1996)

=== Selected short stories ===
- "Shoals" (2013) in Old Mars (anthology)
- "Home Movies" (2006) in Asimov's Science Fiction.
