= Beyond Queer =

1996 anthology

Beyond Queer: Challenging Gay Left Orthodoxy
- Cover of the first edition
- Editor: Bruce Bawer
- Language: English
- Publisher: Free Press
- Publication date: 1996
- Publication place: United States
- Media type: Print
- Pages: 304
- ISBN: 0-684-82766-2
- LC Class: HQ76.3.U5 B49 1996

Beyond Queer: Challenging Gay Left Orthodoxy is a 1996 anthology edited by Bruce Bawer.

== Summary ==
The book is an anthology of essays on gay politics. Contributing writers are:

- Bruce Bawer
- John W. Berresford
- David Boaz
- Stephen H. Chapman
- Mel Dahl
- Yaakov Levado
- David Link
- Carolyn Lochhead
- Daniel Mendelsohn
- Stephen H. Miller
- James P. Pinkerton
- Jonathan Rauch
- Thomas H. Stahel
- Andrew Sullivan
- Paul Varnell
- Norah Vincent
- John Weir

== Publication history ==
Beyond Queer was first published in 1996 by Free Press, a division of Simon & Schuster.

== Reception ==
Beyond Queer was a finalist at the 9th Lambda Literary Awards in the nonfiction anthologies category. Booklist called it one of the "outstanding anthologies" of 1996, saying that it "marks the end of radical dominance in gay politics and culture" and "the beginning of a pragmatic and democratic approach to gay issues". Ron Hayes, writing in The Palm Beach Post, called it "complex, unsettling and thought provoking" and maintained that "No straight person who reads these essays will ever assume all gays are liberal again. And no gay person will ever assume that all conservatives are his enemy, either."

To read the essays in Beyond Queer, wrote Joseph Bottum in the Weekly Standard, "is to experience, again and again, this sense of language broken loose, words unmoored from meaning". Bottum argued that the book's contributors fail "to understand the internal logic of the forms of life to which they demand admittance"; they "want... the tradition without the discipline, the gravity of dogmatic religion and conventional marriage without the duties and surrenders that create gravity. They want, in other words, a reformation of language to purchase for them the fruits that require a reformation of life."
