= Brian Kiteley =

American novelist, and writing teacher (born 1956)

- Born: September 26, 1956 (age 69); Minneapolis, Minnesota, U.S.
- Education: City College of New York
- Occupations: Novelist; Writing teacher

Brian Kiteley (born September 26, 1956) is an American novelist, and writing teacher.

== Life ==
He grew up in Northampton, Massachusetts. He has had residencies from the MacDowell Colony, Millay, Yaddo, and the Fine Arts Work Center. He has taught at the American University in Cairo, Ohio University. He teaches at the University of Denver.

== Awards ==
- 1991 NEA Fellowship
- 1992 Guggenheim Fellowship
- 1996 Whiting Award

== Works ==
- Still Life With Insects. Ticknor & Fields. 1989. ISBN 978-0-89919-898-9.
- I Know Many Songs, But I Cannot Sing. Simon and Schuster. 2002. ISBN 978-0-7432-3759-8.
- The River Gods. University Of Alabama Press. 2009. ISBN 978-1-57366-151-5.

=== Non-fiction ===
- The 3 A.M. Epiphany: Uncommon Writing Exercises That Transform Your Fiction. Writer's Digest Books. 2005. ISBN 978-1-58297-351-7.
- 4 A.M. Breakthrough: Unconventional Writing Exercises That Transform Your Fiction. WRITERS DIGEST. 2009. ISBN 978-1-58297-563-4.

=== Anthologies ===
- Mark Helprin; Shannon Ravenel, eds. (1988). Best American Short Stories, 1988. Houghton Mifflin. ISBN 978-0-395-44256-2.
- Carlen Arnett; Jane Brox; Dzvinia Orlowsky; Martha Rhodes, eds. (2001). The Four Way reader: poetry, fiction, memoir. Four Way Books. ISBN 978-1-884800-40-5.
