= Westbrook (surname) =

Westbrook is a surname. Notable people with the name include:

- Anne Allen Westbrook, American politician
- Brian Westbrook, American football player
- Brianna Westbrook, American politician
- Bryant Westbrook, American football player
- Byron Westbrook, American football player
- Chris I. Westbrook, French physicist
- Danniella Westbrook (born 1973), English actress and television personality
- [David Westbrook] (born 1968), north American teacher and musician
- Dawn Westbrook, alias of Dawn Sime
- Dede Westbrook, American football player
- Helen Searles Westbrook (1889–1967) American composer and organist
- Jake Westbrook (born 1977), American baseball player
- Jamie Westbrook (born 1995), American baseball player
- Jeff Westbrook, TV writer and algorithms researcher
- John Westbrook, American football player and pastor
- Karimah Westbrook (born 1978), American actress
- Kate Westbrook (born 1939), English painter, jazz singer and musician
- Lawrence Westbrook, American college basketball player
- Mary Westbrook or Mary Westbrook Van Deusen (1829–1908), American author
- Michael Westbrook, American football player
- Mike Westbrook (1936–2026), English jazz pianist, composer, and writer of orchestrated jazz pieces
- Peter Westbrook (1952–2024), American saber fencer
- Richard Westbrook, British racing driver
- Russell Westbrook, American basketball player
- Ruth Westbrook, English cricketer
- Scarlett Westbrook (born 2004), British climate justice activist and journalist
- Tati Westbrook, American internet personality
- Thomas Westbrook, Colonial New England militia leader and namesake for Westbrook, Maine

== See also ==
- Nigel Westbrook Emery (born 1949), Australian poet, educator, and surf lifesaver.
- John Westbrooke (1616–1666), English landowner and politician
- Zain Westbrooke (born 1996), English footballer
- Wesbrook, surname
