= Scarlett (given name) =

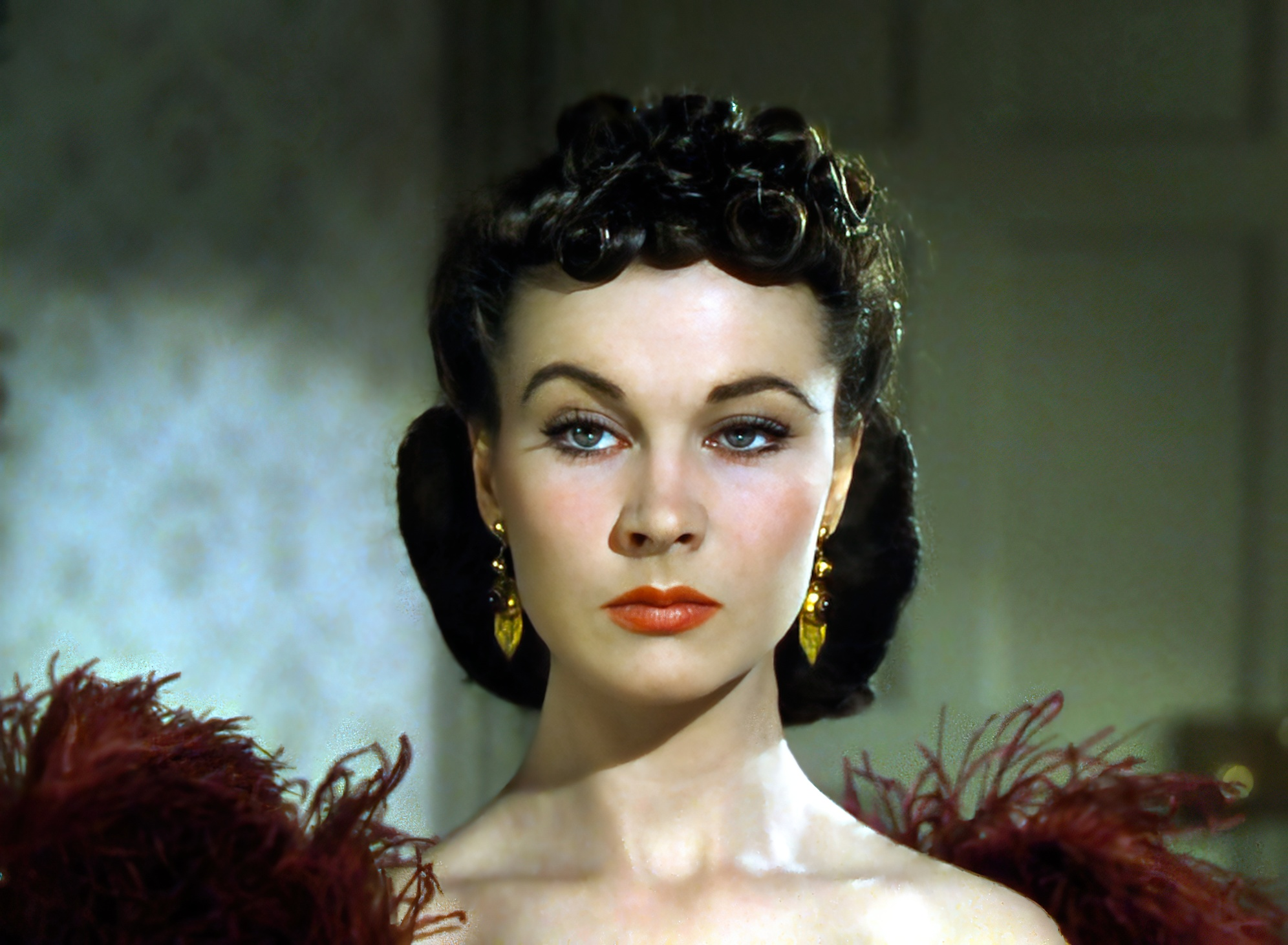
- Vivien Leigh portrayed Scarlett O'Hara in Gone with the Wind.
- Gender: Female

Origin
- Origin: English
- Meaning: Red

Other names
- Nicknames: Letty, Scar, Safrina
- Related names: Scarlet, Scarlette

Scarlett is a feminine given name. It gained popularity due to the character Scarlett O'Hara in Margaret Mitchell's best-selling novel Gone with the Wind and the film adaptation. The name has been well used in recent years for girls in the United Kingdom and in the United States.

The name also has associations with the bright red color scarlet. Scarlett originated as an occupation surname, designating a person who sold scarlet, a luxury wool cloth produced in medieval Europe.

== Usage ==
Usage of the name has increased in the Anglosphere in recent years. It has ranked among the top 20 names given to newborn American girls since 2021 and was the 14th most popular name for girls in that country in 2022. It has also ranked among the top 100 names for newborn girls in Australia, Canada, New Zealand, and the United Kingdom in recent years. In 2022, it was the 36th most popular name given to girls in Canada.

== People named Scarlett ==
- Scarlett Archer (born 1989 or 1990), British actress
- Scarlett Bordeaux (born 1991), American professional wrestler
- Scarlett Bowman (born 1985), English actress
- Scarlett Byrne (born 1990), English actress
- Scarlett Estevez (born 2007), American actress
- Scarlett O'Phelan Godoy (born 1951), Peruvian historian and university professor
- Scarlett Johansson (born 1984), American actress
- Scarlett Alice Johnson (born 1985), English actress
- Scarlett Keegan (born 1984), American model and actress
- Scarlett Miller, American engineering professor
- Scarlett Moffatt (born 1990), English television personality
- Scarlett Pomers (born 1988), American actress
- Scarlett Werner (born 1984), German tennis player
- Scarlett Westbrook (born 2004), British climate justice activist and journalist

=== Fictional characters ===
- Scarlett (G.I. Joe), in the G.I. Joe universe
- Scarlett, in the e4 TV series Skins
- Scarlett Adams, Indonesian-English girl with strange powers from The Power of Five book series
- Scarlett Kiernan, from the British soap opera Doctors
- Scarlett Nicholls, from the British ITV soap opera Emmerdale
- Scarlett O'Hara, main character in the novel Gone with the Wind and the film of the same name
- Scarlett Valentine, in the New Zealand soap opera Shortland Street
