= Wesbrook =

Wesbrook is a surname. Notable people with the name include:

- Coy Wayne Wesbrook (1958–2016), American mass murderer
- Frank Wesbrook (1868–1918), Canadian physician and academic
- Walter Wesbrook (1898–1991), American tennis player and coach

== See also ==
- Westbrook (surname)
