= Gone with the Wind (film) =

1939 film by Victor Fleming

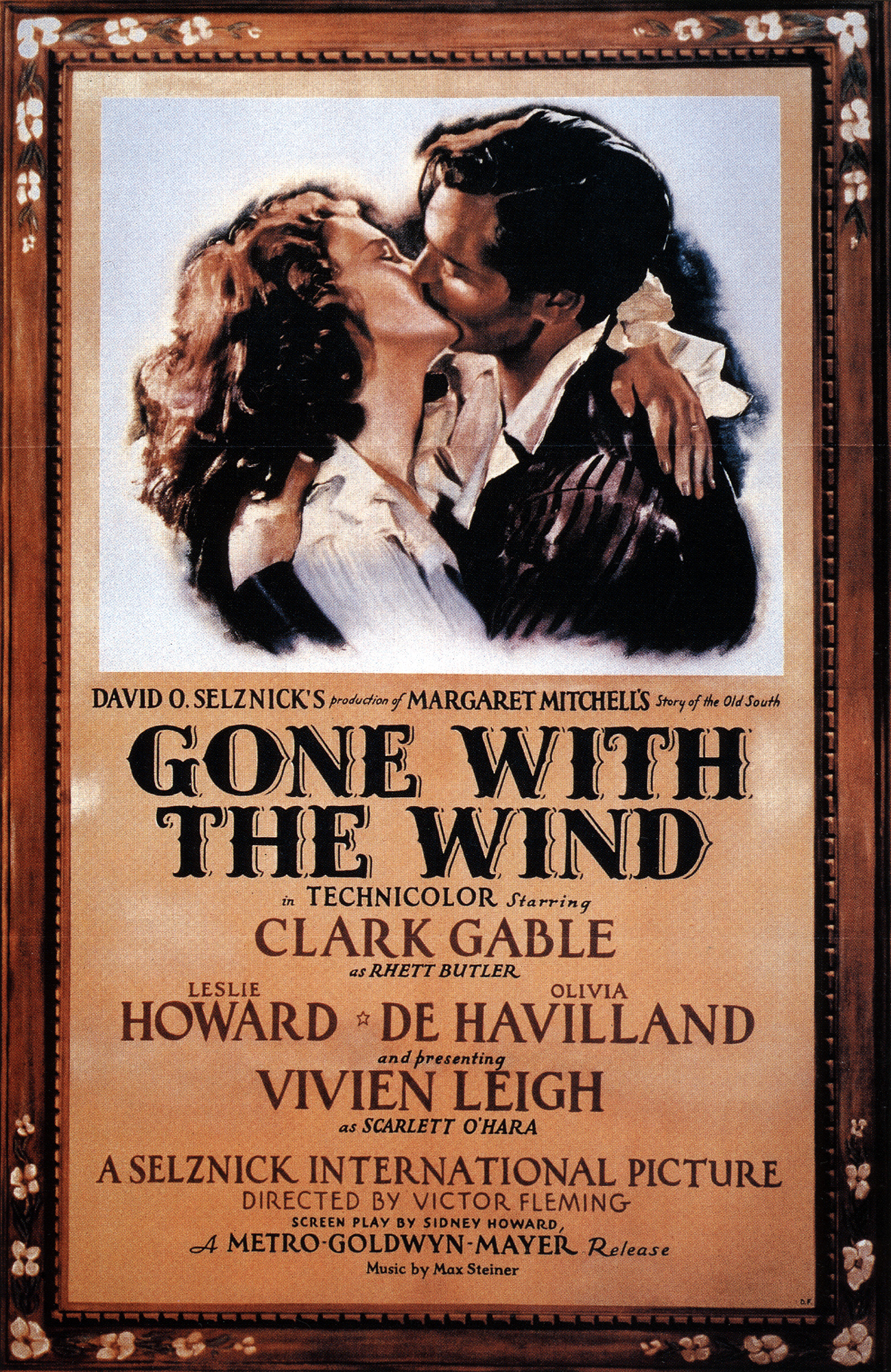
- Theatrical release poster
- Directed by: Victor Fleming
- Screenplay by: Sidney Howard
- Based on: Gone with the Wind by Margaret Mitchell
- Produced by: David O. Selznick
- Starring: Clark Gable; Vivien Leigh; Leslie Howard; Olivia de Havilland
- Cinematography: Ernest Haller
- Edited by: Hal C. Kern; James E. Newcom
- Music by: Max Steiner
- Production companies: Selznick International Pictures; Metro-Goldwyn-Mayer
- Distributed by: Loew's Incorporated (Note: Loews was the parent company of MGM.)
- Release date: December 15, 1939 (Atlanta premiere)
- Running time: 221 minutes; 234–238 minutes (with overture, intermission, entr'acte, and exit music)
- Country: United States
- Language: English
- Budget: $3.85 million
- Box office: >$390 million

Gone with the Wind is a 1939 American epic historical romance film adapted from the 1936 novel by Margaret Mitchell. It was produced by David O. Selznick of Selznick International Pictures and directed by Victor Fleming. Set in the American South during the Civil War and Reconstruction, the film tells the story of Scarlett O'Hara (Vivien Leigh), the strong-willed daughter of a Georgia plantation owner, following her romantic pursuit of Ashley Wilkes (Leslie Howard), who is married to his cousin Melanie Hamilton (Olivia de Havilland), and her subsequent marriage to Rhett Butler (Clark Gable).

The production was troubled. The start of filming was delayed for two years until January 1939 because Selznick was determined to secure Gable for the role of Rhett, and filming concluded in July. The role of Scarlett was challenging to cast, and 1,400 unknown women were interviewed for the part. Sidney Howard's initial screenplay underwent many revisions by several writers to reduce it to a suitable length. The original director, George Cukor, was fired shortly after filming began and was replaced by Fleming, who in turn was briefly replaced by Sam Wood while taking some time off due to exhaustion. Post-production concluded in November 1939, just a month before its premiere.

Gone With the Wind received generally positive reviews upon its release on December 15, 1939. While the casting was widely praised, the long running time received criticism. At the 12th Academy Awards, Gone with the Wind received ten Academy Awards (eight competitive, two honorary) from thirteen nominations, including wins for Best Picture, Best Director (Fleming), Best Adapted Screenplay (posthumously awarded to Sidney Howard), Best Actress (Leigh), and Best Supporting Actress (Hattie McDaniel, becoming the first African-American to win an Academy Award). It set records for the total number of wins and nominations at the time.

Gone with the Wind was immensely popular when first released. It became the highest-earning film made up to that point and held the record for over a quarter of a century. When adjusted for monetary inflation, it remains the highest-grossing film in history. It has been re-released periodically since and is ingrained in popular culture. Although the film has been criticized as historical negationism, glorifying slavery and the Lost Cause of the Confederacy myth, it has been credited with triggering changes in how African-Americans were depicted cinematically. Gone with the Wind is regarded as one of the greatest films of all time, and in 1989, it became one of the twenty-five inaugural films selected for preservation in the United States National Film Registry.

== Plot ==
In 1861, on the eve of the American Civil War, Scarlett O'Hara lives at Tara, her family's cotton plantation in Georgia, with her parents, her sisters Suellen and Carreen, and their black slaves. Scarlett is deeply attracted to Ashley Wilkes and learns he is to be married to his cousin, Melanie Hamilton. At an engagement party the next day at Ashley's home, Twelve Oaks, a nearby plantation, Scarlett makes an advance on Ashley but is rebuffed; however, she catches the attention of another guest, Rhett Butler. The party is disrupted by news of the attack on Fort Sumter and President Lincoln's call for volunteers to suppress the rebellion; in response, the Southern men enthusiastically rush to enlist in the Confederate army. Scarlett marries Melanie's brother, and Ashley's sister India's beau, Charles, to arouse jealousy in Ashley before he leaves to fight. Following Charles's death while serving in the Confederate Army, Scarlett's mother sends her to the Hamilton home in Atlanta. She creates a scene by attending a charity bazaar in mourning attire and waltzing with Rhett, now a blockade runner for the Confederacy.

The tide of war turns against the Confederacy after the Battle of Gettysburg. Many of the men of Scarlett's town are killed. Eight months later, as the Union Army besieges the city in the Atlanta campaign, Melanie gives birth with Scarlett's aid, and Rhett helps them flee the city. Rhett chooses to go off to fight, leaving Scarlett to make her own way back to Tara. She finds Tara deserted, except for her father, sisters, and former slaves, Mammy and Pork. Scarlett learns that her mother has just died of typhoid fever, and her father has lost his mind. With Tara pillaged by Union troops and the fields untended, Scarlett vows to ensure her and her family's survival.

With the defeat of the Confederacy, the O'Haras toil in the cotton fields. Ashley returns but finds he is of little help to Tara. When Scarlett begs him to run away with her, he confesses his desire for her and kisses her passionately but says he cannot leave Melanie. Scarlett's father attempts to chase away a carpetbagger from his land but is thrown from his horse and killed. Unable to pay the Reconstructionist taxes imposed on Tara, Scarlett unsuccessfully appeals to Rhett, then dupes Suellen's fiancé, the middle-aged and wealthy general store owner Frank Kennedy, into marrying her. Frank, Ashley, and several other accomplices make a night raid on a shanty town after Scarlett is attacked while driving through it alone, resulting in Frank's death. Shortly after Frank's funeral, Rhett proposes to Scarlett, and she accepts.

Rhett and Scarlett have a daughter whom Rhett nicknames Bonnie Blue, but Scarlett still pines for Ashley and, chagrined at the perceived ruin of her figure, refuses to have any more children or share a bed with Rhett. One day at Frank's mill, Ashley's sister, India, sees Scarlett and Ashley embracing. Harboring an intense dislike of Scarlett, India eagerly spreads rumors. Later that evening, Rhett, having heard the rumors, forces Scarlett to attend Ashley's birthday party. Melanie, however, stands by Scarlett. After returning home, Scarlett finds Rhett downstairs drunk, and they argue about Ashley. Rhett kisses Scarlett against her will, stating his intent to have sex with her that night, and carries the struggling Scarlett to the bedroom.

The next day, Rhett apologizes for his behavior and offers Scarlett a divorce, which she rejects, saying it would be a disgrace. When Rhett returns from an extended trip to London, England, Scarlett informs him that she is pregnant, but an argument ensues, during which she falls down a flight of stairs and loses her baby. While recovering, tragedy strikes again when Bonnie dies while attempting to jump a fence with her pony. Scarlett and Rhett visit Melanie, who has suffered complications from a new pregnancy, on her deathbed. As Scarlett consoles Ashley, Rhett prepares to leave Atlanta. Having realized that it was Rhett, and not Ashley, whom she truly loved all along, Scarlett pleads with Rhett to stay, but he rebuffs her and walks away into the early morning fog. A distraught Scarlett resolves to return home to Tara, vowing to one day win Rhett back.

== Cast ==
At Tara

The O'Hara Plantation in Georgia

- Thomas Mitchell as Gerald O'Hara
- Barbara O'Neil as Ellen Robillard (his wife)

Their daughters:

- Vivien Leigh as Scarlett O'Hara
- Evelyn Keyes as Suellen O'Hara
- Ann Rutherford as Carreen O'Hara

Scarlett's beaux:

- George Reeves as Stuart Tarleton (credited as Brent Tarleton) (Note: The credits at the start of the film contain an error: George Reeves is listed "as Brent Tarleton", but plays Stuart, while Fred Crane is listed "as Stuart Tarleton", but plays Brent.)
- Fred Crane as Brent Tarleton (credited as Stuart Tarleton)

The house servants: (Note: Hattie McDaniel, Oscar Polk and Butterfly McQueen's characters are enslaved until emancipation.)

- Hattie McDaniel as Mammy
- Oscar Polk as Pork
- Butterfly McQueen as Prissy

In the fields:

- Victor Jory as Jonas Wilkerson (the overseer)
- Everett Brown as Big Sam (the foreman)

At Twelve Oaks

The nearby Wilkes Plantation

- Howard Hickman as John Wilkes
- Alicia Rhett as India Wilkes (his daughter)
- Leslie Howard as Ashley Wilkes (his son)
- Olivia de Havilland as Melanie Hamilton (their cousin)
- Rand Brooks as Charles Hamilton (Melanie's brother)
- Carroll Nye as Frank Kennedy (a guest)

and a visitor from Charleston

- Clark Gable as Rhett Butler

In Atlanta

- Laura Hope Crews as Aunt "Pittypat" Hamilton
- Eddie Anderson as Uncle Peter (her coachman)
- Harry Davenport as Dr. Meade
- Leona Roberts as Mrs. Meade
- Jane Darwell as Mrs. Merriwether
- Ona Munson as Belle Watling

Minor supporting roles (Note: In this section, only the actors' names are given in the film's credits; no roles are credited.)

- Paul Hurst as the Yankee deserter
- Cammie King as Bonnie Blue Butler
- J. M. Kerrigan as Johnny Gallagher
- Jackie Moran as Phil Meade
- Lillian Kemble-Cooper as Bonnie's nurse in London
- Marcella Martin as Cathleen Calvert
- Mickey Kuhn as Beau Wilkes
- Irving Bacon as the Corporal
- William Bakewell as the mounted officer
- Isabel Jewell as Emmy Slattery
- Eric Linden as the amputation case
- Ward Bond as Tom, the Yankee captain
- Cliff Edwards as the reminiscent soldier
- Yakima Canutt as the renegade
- Louis Jean Heydt as the hungry soldier holding Beau Wilkes
- Olin Howland as the carpetbagger businessman
- Robert Elliott as the Yankee major
- Mary Anderson as Maybelle Merriwether

== Production ==
Before the publication of the novel, several Hollywood executives and studios declined to create a film based on it, including Louis B. Mayer and Irving Thalberg at Metro-Goldwyn-Mayer (MGM), Pandro S. Berman at RKO Radio Pictures, and David O. Selznick of Selznick International Pictures. Jack L. Warner of Warner Bros. considered purchasing the rights after reading the synopsis, but his biggest star Bette Davis was not interested at the time, and Darryl F. Zanuck of 20th Century-Fox had not offered enough money. However, Selznick changed his mind after his story editor Kay Brown and business partner John Hay Whitney urged him to purchase the film rights. In July 1936—a month after it was published—Selznick bought the rights from Margaret Mitchell for $50,000.

=== Casting ===
Clark Gable and Vivien Leigh as Rhett Butler and Scarlett O'Hara

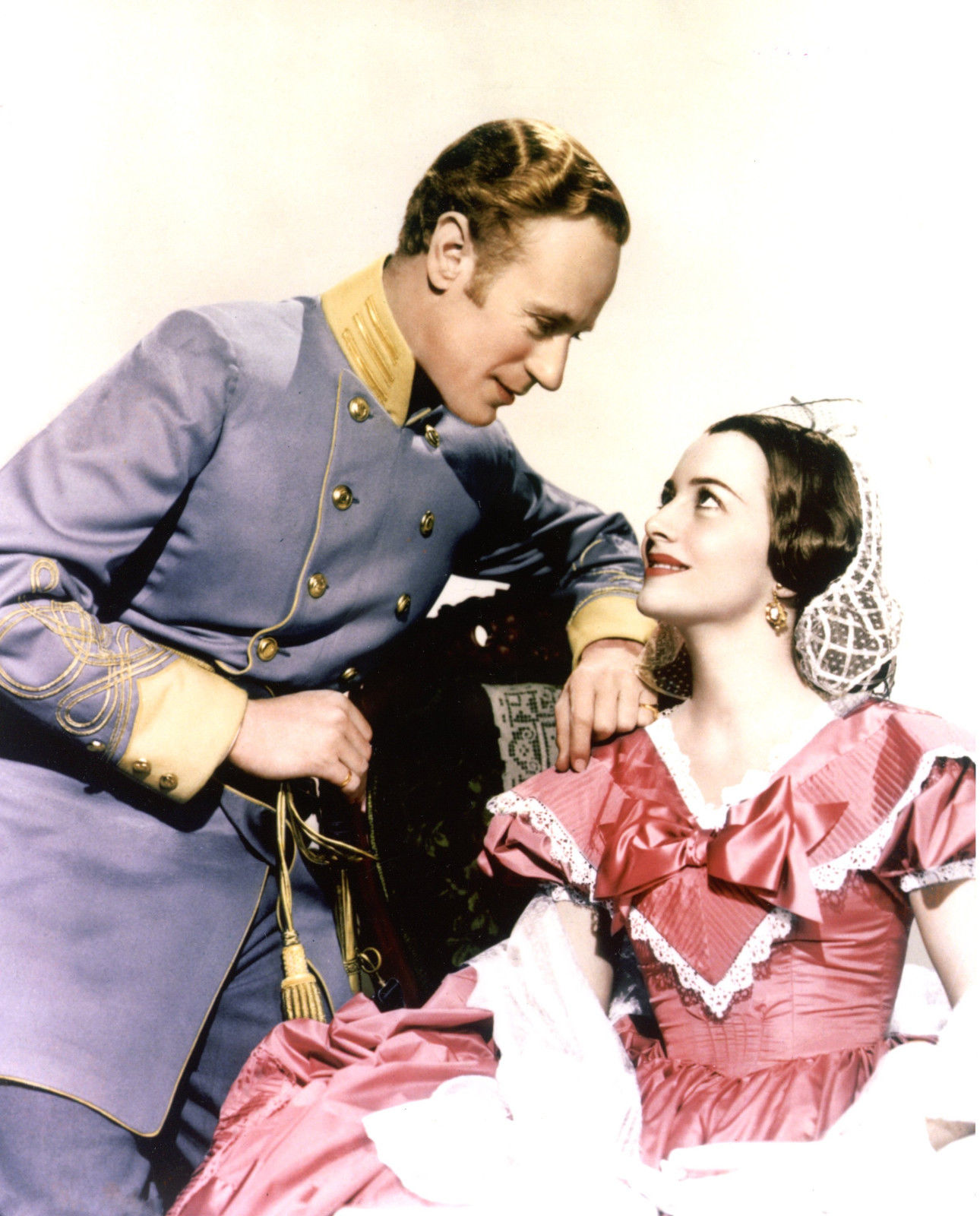
Leslie Howard as Ashley Wilkes and Olivia de Havilland as Melanie Hamilton.

The casting of the two lead roles became a complex, two-year endeavor. For the role of Rhett Butler, Selznick from the start wanted Clark Gable, but Gable was under contract to MGM, which never loaned him to other studios. Gary Cooper was considered, but Samuel Goldwyn—to whom Cooper was under contract—refused to loan him out. Warner offered a package of Bette Davis, Errol Flynn, and Olivia de Havilland for lead roles in return for the distribution rights, but Davis refused to star opposite Flynn as Rhett Butler. By this time, Selznick was determined to get Gable, and in August 1938 he eventually struck a deal with his father-in-law, MGM chief Louis B. Mayer, in which MGM agreed to provide Gable and $1.25 million for half of the production budget, and would distribute the film. In return, Selznick would have to pay Gable's weekly salary and half the profits would go to MGM.

The arrangement to release through MGM meant delaying the start of production until the end of 1938, when Selznick's current distribution deal with United Artists concluded. Selznick used the delay to revise the script and, more importantly, build publicity through their endeavors to cast the role of Scarlett. Selznick began a nationwide casting call interviewing 1,400 unknowns. The effort cost $100,000 and proved useless for the main objective of casting the role, but created "priceless" publicity. Early frontrunners included Miriam Hopkins and Tallulah Bankhead, who were regarded as possibilities by Selznick prior to the purchase of the film rights; Joan Crawford, who was signed to MGM, was also considered as a potential pairing with Gable. After the deal was struck with MGM, Selznick held discussions with Norma Shearer—who was one of MGM's top female stars at the time—but she withdrew herself from consideration after negative feedback from movie fans. Katharine Hepburn lobbied hard for the role with the support of her friend, George Cukor, who had been hired to direct, but she was vetoed by Selznick, who felt she was not right for the part.

Many actresses, both known and unknown, were considered, but only thirty, in addition to the eventual choice, Vivien Leigh, were actually tested for the role, including Ardis Ankerson (Brenda Marshall), Jean Arthur, Tallulah Bankhead, Diana Barrymore, Joan Bennett, Nancy Coleman, Frances Dee, Terry Ray (Ellen Drew), Paulette Goddard, Edythe Marrenner (Susan Hayward), Anita Louise, Haila Stoddard, Margaret Tallichet, Lana Turner, and Linda Watkins. Although Margaret Mitchell refused to publicly name her choice, the actress who came closest to winning her approval was Miriam Hopkins, whom Mitchell felt was just the right type of actress to play Scarlett as written in the book. However, Hopkins was in her mid-thirties at the time and was considered too old for the part. Four actresses, including Jean Arthur and Joan Bennett, were still under consideration by December 1938; however, only two finalists, Paulette Goddard, and Vivien Leigh, were tested in Technicolor, both on December 20. Goddard almost won the role, but controversy over her marriage to Charlie Chaplin caused Selznick to change his mind.

Selznick had been quietly considering Vivien Leigh, a young English actress who was still little known in America, for the role of Scarlett since February 1938 when Selznick saw her in Fire Over England and A Yank at Oxford. Leigh's American agent was the London representative of the Myron Selznick talent agency (headed by David Selznick's brother, one of the owners of Selznick International), and she had requested in February that her name be submitted for consideration as Scarlett. By the summer of 1938, the Selznicks were negotiating with Alexander Korda, to whom Leigh was under contract, for her services later that year. Selznick's brother arranged for them to meet for the first time on the night of December 10, 1938, when the burning of Atlanta was filmed. In a letter to his wife two days later, Selznick admitted that Leigh was "the Scarlett dark horse", and after a series of screen tests, her casting was announced on January 13, 1939. Just before the shooting, Selznick informed newspaper columnist Ed Sullivan: "Scarlett O'Hara's parents were French and Irish. Identically, Miss Leigh's parents are French and Irish."

A pressing issue for Selznick throughout casting was Hollywood's persistent failure to accurately portray Southern accents. The studio believed that if the accent was not accurately depicted, it could prove detrimental to the success. Selznick hired Susan Myrick (an expert on Southern speech, manners, and customs recommended to him by Mitchell) and Will A. Price to coach the actors on speaking with a Southern drawl. Mitchell was complimentary about the vocal work of the cast, noting the lack of criticism when the film came out.

=== Screenplay ===
Of the original screenplay writer, Sidney Howard, film historian Joanne Yeck writes: "[R]educing the intricacies of Gone with the Wind's epic dimensions was a herculean task ... and Howard's first submission was far too long, and would have required at least six hours of film; ... [producer] Selznick wanted Howard to remain on the set to make revisions ... but Howard refused to leave New England [and] as a result, revisions were handled by a host of local writers". Selznick dismissed director George Cukor three weeks into filming and sought out Victor Fleming, who was directing The Wizard of Oz at the time. Fleming was dissatisfied with the script, so Selznick brought in the screenwriter Ben Hecht to rewrite the entire screenplay within five days. Hecht returned to Howard's original draft and, by the end of the week, had succeeded in revising the entire first half of the script. Selznick undertook to rewrite the second half himself but fell behind schedule, so Howard returned to work on the script for one week, reworking several key scenes in part two.

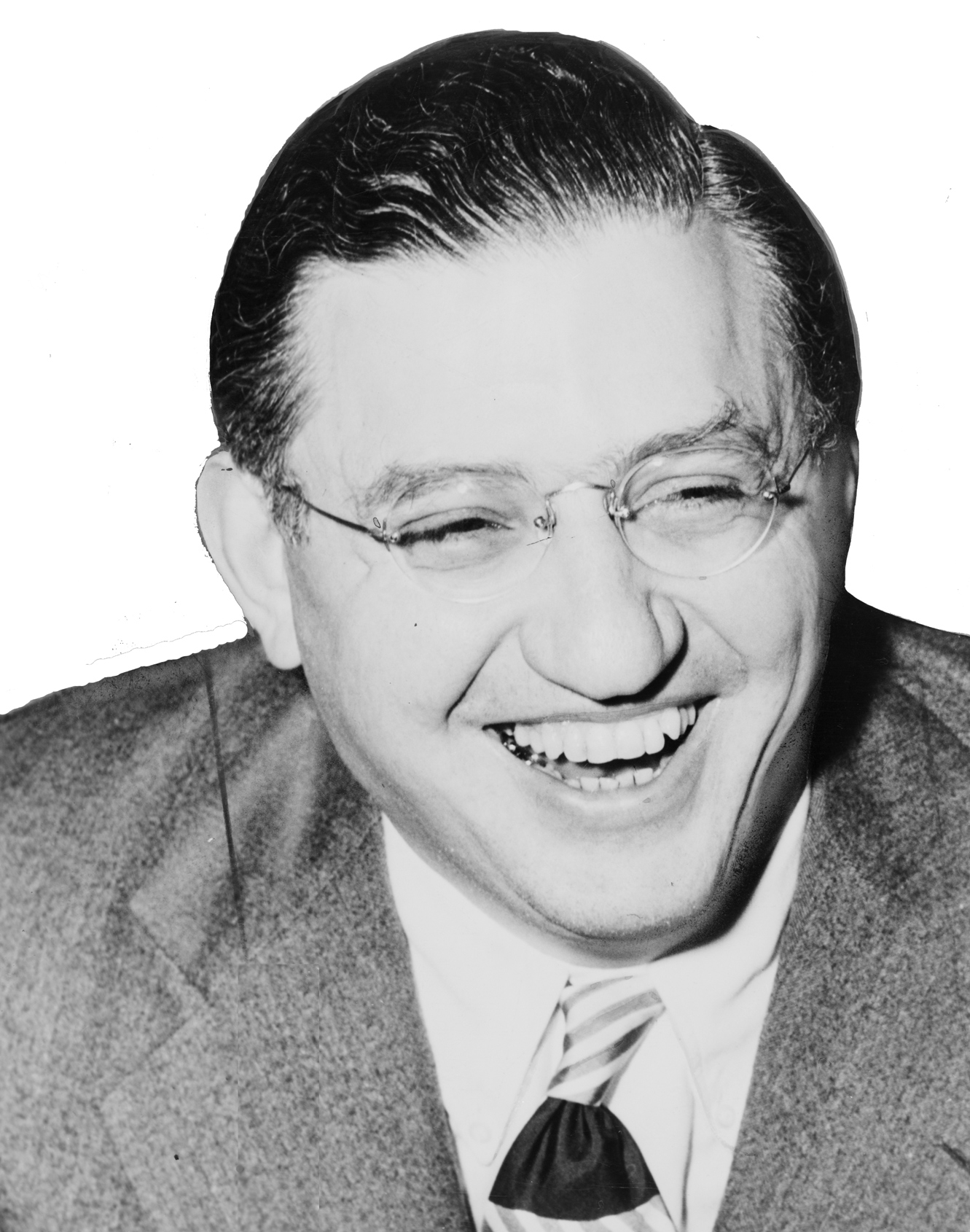
David O. Selznick in 1940

"By the time of the film's release in 1939, there was some question as to who should receive screen credit", writes Yeck. "But despite the number of writers and changes, the final script was remarkably close to Howard's version. The fact that Howard's name alone appears on the credits may have been as much a gesture to his memory as his writing, for in 1939, Sidney Howard died at age 48 in a farm-tractor accident, and before the movie's premiere." Selznick, in a memo written in October 1939, discussed the writing credits: "[Y]ou can say frankly that of the comparatively small amount of material in the picture which is not from the book, most is my own personally, and the only original lines of dialog which are not my own are a few from Sidney Howard and a few from Ben Hecht and a couple more from John Van Druten. Offhand I doubt that there are ten original words of [Oliver] Garrett's in the whole script. As to construction, this is about eighty per cent my own, and the rest divided between Jo Swerling and Sidney Howard, with Hecht having contributed materially to the construction of one sequence."

According to Hecht's biographer William MacAdams,

At dawn on Sunday, February 20, 1939, David Selznick ... and director Victor Fleming shook Hecht awake to inform him he was on loan from MGM and must come with them immediately and go to work on Gone with the Wind, which Selznick had begun shooting five weeks before. It was costing Selznick $50,000 each day the film was on hold, waiting for a final screenplay rewrite, and time was of the essence. Hecht was in the middle of working on the film At the Circus for the Marx Brothers. Recalling the episode in a letter to screenwriter friend Gene Fowler, he said he hadn't read the novel, but Selznick and director Fleming could not wait for him to read it. They acted in scenes based on Sidney Howard's original script, which needed to be rewritten in a hurry. Hecht wrote: "After each scene had been performed and discussed, I sat down at the typewriter and wrote it out. Selznick and Fleming, eager to continue with their acting, kept hurrying me. We worked in this fashion for seven days, putting in eighteen to twenty hours a day. Selznick refused to let us eat lunch, arguing that food would slow us up. He provided bananas and salted peanuts ... thus on the seventh day I had completed, unscathed, the first nine reels of the Civil War epic."

MacAdams writes: "It is impossible to determine exactly how much Hecht scripted ... In the official credits filed with the Screen Writers Guild, Sidney Howard was of course awarded the sole screen credit, but four other writers were appended ... Jo Swerling for contributing to the treatment, Oliver H. P. Garrett and Barbara Keon to screenplay construction, and Hecht, to dialogue ..."

=== Filming ===
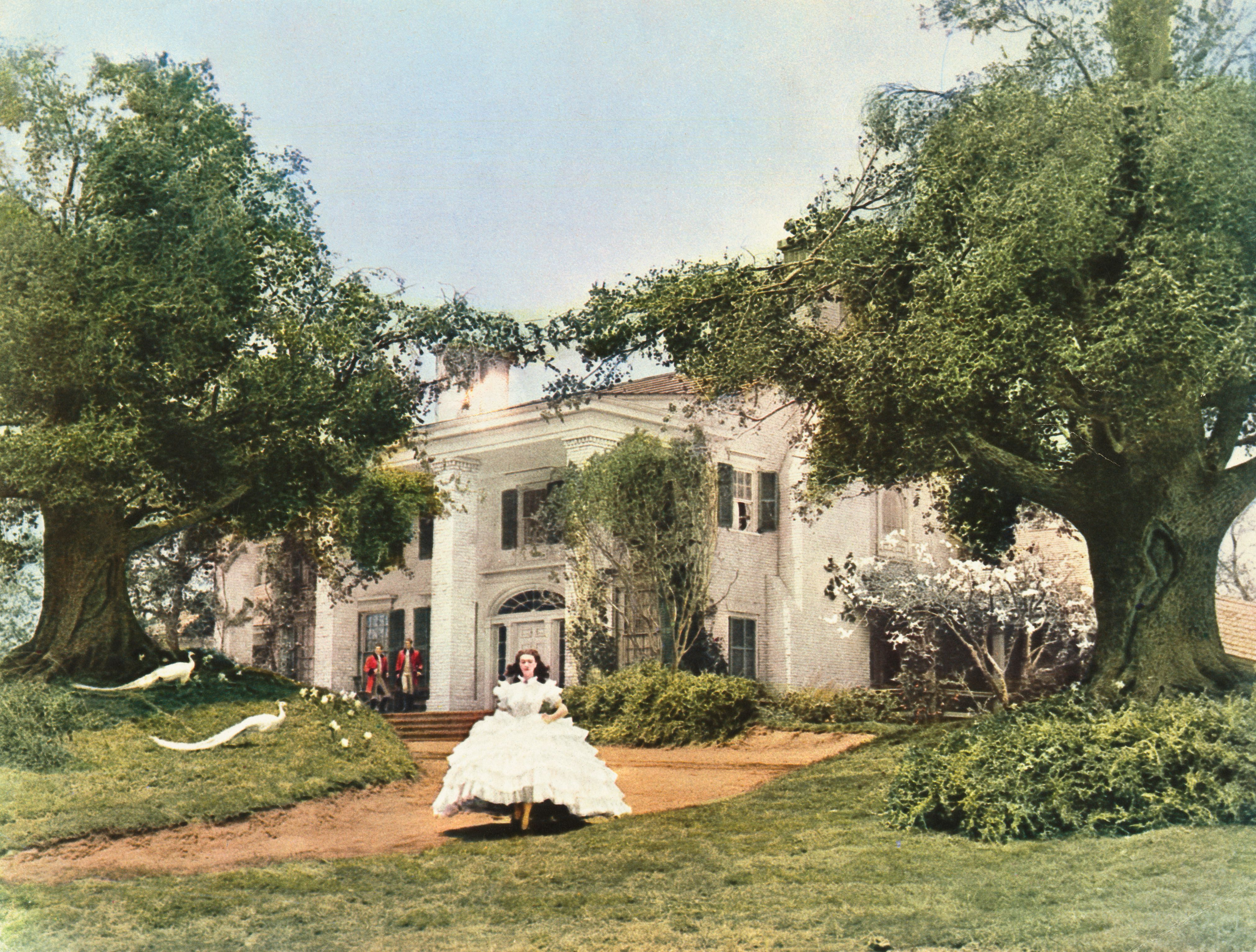
Tara, the fictional Southern plantation house, existed only as a plywood and papier-mâché façade built on the Selznick studio lot.

Principal photography began on January 26, 1939, and ended on July 1, with post-production work continuing until November 11, 1939. Director George Cukor, with whom Selznick had a long working relationship and who had spent almost two years in pre-production on Gone with the Wind, was replaced after less than three weeks of shooting. (Note: From a private letter from journalist and on-set technical advisor Susan Myrick to Margaret Mitchell in February 1939: George [Cukor] finally told me all about it ... He hated [leaving the production] very much he said but he could not do otherwise. In effect he said he is an honest craftsman and he cannot do a job unless he knows it is a good job and he feels the present job is not right. For days, he told me, he has looked at the rushes and felt he was failing ... the thing did not click as it should. Gradually he became convinced that the script was the trouble ... David [Selznick], himself, thinks HE is writing the script.... And George has continually taken script from day to day, compared the [Oliver] Garrett-Selznick version with the [Sidney] Howard, groaned and tried to change some parts back to the Howard script. But he seldom could do much with the scene.... So George just told David he would not work any longer if the script was not better and he wanted the Howard script back. David told George he was a director—not an author and he (David) was the producer and the judge of what is a good script.... George said he was a director and a damn good one and he would not let his name go out over a lousy picture.... And bull-headed David said "OK get out!" Selznick had already been unhappy with Cukor, "a very expensive luxury", for not being more receptive to directing other Selznick assignments, even though Cukor had remained on salary since early 1937. In a confidential memo written in September 1938, Selznick flirted with the idea of replacing him with Victor Fleming. Louis B. Mayer had been trying to have Cukor replaced with an MGM director since negotiations between the two studios began in May 1938. In December 1938, Selznick wrote to his wife about a phone call he had with Mayer: "During the same conversation, your father made another stab at getting George off of Gone With the Wind.") Selznick and Cukor had already disagreed over the pace of filming and the script, but other explanations put Cukor's departure down to Gable's discomfort at working with him. Vivien Leigh and Olivia de Havilland learned of Cukor's firing on the day the Atlanta bazaar scene was filmed, and the pair went to Selznick's office in full costume and implored him to change his mind. Victor Fleming, who was directing The Wizard of Oz, was called in from MGM to complete the film. However, Cukor continued privately to coach Leigh and De Havilland. Another MGM director, Sam Wood, worked for two weeks in May when Fleming temporarily left the production due to exhaustion. Although some of Cukor's scenes were later reshot, Selznick estimated that "three solid reels" of his work remained in the final cut. As of the end of principal photography, Cukor had undertaken eighteen days of filming, Fleming ninety-three, and Wood twenty-four.

Cinematographer Lee Garmes began the production, but on March 11, 1939—after a month of shooting footage that Selznick and his associates regarded as "too dark"—was replaced with Ernest Haller, working with Technicolor cinematographer Ray Rennahan. Garmes completed the first third of the film—mostly everything prior to Melanie having the baby—but did not receive a credit.

Most of the filming was done on "the back forty" studio backlot of Selznick International with all the location scenes being photographed in California, mostly in Los Angeles County or neighboring Ventura County. Tara, the fictional Southern plantation house, existed only as a plywood and papier-mâché façade built on the Selznick studio lot. For the burning of Atlanta, new façades were built in front of the Selznick backlot's many old abandoned sets, and Selznick himself operated the controls for the explosives that burned them down. Sources at the time put the estimated production costs at $3.85 million, making it the second most expensive film made up to that point, with only Ben-Hur (1925) having cost more. (Note: Time also reports that Hell's Angels (1930)—directed by Howard Hughes—cost more, but this was later revealed to be incorrect; the accounts for Hell's Angels show it cost $2.8 million, but Hughes publicized it as costing $4 million, selling it to the media as the most expensive film ever made up to that point.)

Although legend persists that the Hays Office fined Selznick $5,000 for using the word "damn" in Butler's exit line, in fact, the Motion Picture Association board passed an amendment to the Production Code on November 1, 1939, that forbade the use of the words "hell" or "damn" except when their use "shall be essential and required for portrayal, in proper historical context, of any scene or dialogue based upon historical fact or folklore ... or a quotation from a literary work, provided that no such use shall be permitted which is intrinsically objectionable or offends good taste". With that amendment, the Production Code Administration had no further objection to Rhett's closing line.

=== Music ===
Selznick chose Max Steiner to compose the score, with whom he had worked at RKO Pictures in the early 1930s. Warner Bros.—who had contracted Steiner in 1936—agreed to lend him to Selznick. Steiner spent twelve weeks working on the score, the most prolonged period he had ever spent writing one, and at two hours and thirty-six minutes long, it was also the longest he had ever written. Five orchestrators were hired: Hugo Friedhofer, Maurice de Packh, Bernhard Kaun, Adolph Deutsch and Reginald Hazeltine Bassett.

The score is characterized by two love themes, one for Ashley and Melanie's sweet love and another that evokes Scarlett's passion for Ashley, though notably, there is no Scarlett and Rhett love theme. Steiner drew considerably on folk and patriotic music, which included Stephen Foster tunes such as "Louisiana Belle", "Dolly Day", "Ringo De Banjo", "Beautiful Dreamer", "Old Folks at Home", and "Katie Belle", which formed the basis of Scarlett's theme; other tunes that feature prominently are: "Marching through Georgia" by Henry Clay Work, "Dixie", "Garryowen", and "The Bonnie Blue Flag". The theme that is most associated with the film today is the melody that accompanies Tara, the O'Hara plantation; in the early 1940s, "Tara's Theme" formed the musical basis of the song "My Own True Love" by Mack David. In all, there are ninety-nine separate pieces of music featured in the score.

Due to the pressure of completing on time, Steiner received some assistance in composing from Friedhofer, Deutsch, and Heinz Roemheld, and in addition, two short cues—by Franz Waxman and William Axt—were taken from scores in the MGM library.

=== Costuming ===
Color, texture, and fabric were used to reinforce Scarlett O'Hara's narrative arc and character development. While early gowns feature light pastels and vibrant primary colors, her post-war attire transitions to darker crimson and burgundy tones as her circumstances become more dire. In the latter part of the film, Scarlett's more extravagant and colorful costumes were used to contrast her against the drabness of the other characters.

Young Scarlett in a streamlined pastel green and white dress

Mature Scarlett in a streamlined crimson gown

The costumes combined historical reference with contemporary Hollywood aesthetics. Costume designer Walter Plunkett drew on nineteenth-century sources such as illustrations in Godey's Lady's Book and surviving 1860s–1870s garments while streamlining volume and ornamentation to suit 1930s screen taste and the practical needs of filming. Plunkett's approach produced gowns that evoked period silhouettes whilst omitting excessive ruffles, bows, and lace in favour of cleaner lines and Hollywood trimmings such as ostrich plumes.

== Release ==
=== Preview, premiere, and initial release ===
On September 9, 1939, Selznick, his wife, Irene, investor John "Jock" Whitney, and film editor Hal Kern drove to Riverside, California, to watch a rough cut at the Fox Theatre, without incomplete titles and special optical effects. It ran for four hours and twenty-five minutes; the final release was cut to under four hours. A double bill of Hawaiian Nights and Beau Geste was playing, but after the first feature it was announced that instead of the second bill, the theater would be screening a preview of an unnamed upcoming film; the audience were informed they could leave but would not be readmitted once the film had begun, nor would phone calls be allowed once the theater had been sealed. When the title appeared on the screen, the audience cheered, and after it had ended, the film received a standing ovation. In his biography of Selznick, David Thomson wrote that the audience's response before the film had even started "was the greatest moment of [Selznick's] life, the greatest victory and redemption of all his failings", with Selznick describing the preview cards as "probably the most amazing any picture has ever had". When Selznick was asked by the press in early September how he felt about the film, he said, "At noon I think it's divine, at midnight I think it's lousy. Sometimes I think it's the greatest picture ever made. But if it's only a great picture, I'll still be satisfied."

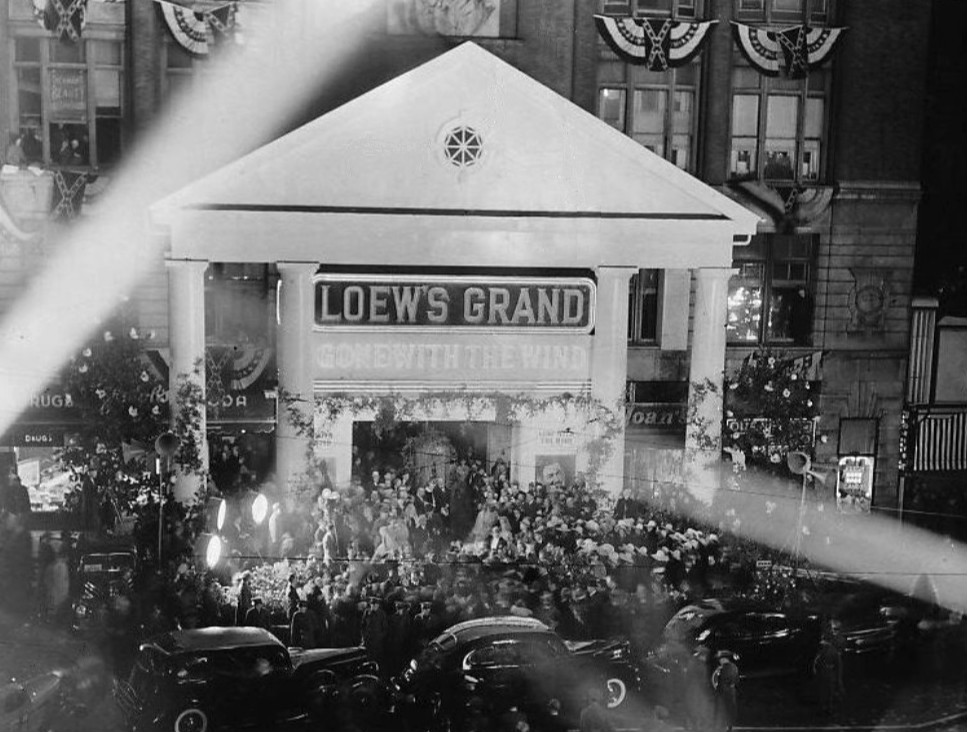
The premiere of the film at Loew's Grand, Atlanta

About 300,000 people came out in Atlanta for the premiere at the Loew's Grand Theatre on December 15, 1939. It was the climax of three days of festivities hosted by Mayor William B. Hartsfield, which included a parade of limousines featuring stars from the film, receptions, thousands of Confederate flags, and a costume ball. Eurith D. Rivers, the governor of Georgia, declared December 15 a state holiday. An estimated 300,000 Atlanta residents and visitors lined the streets for seven miles to view the procession of limousines that brought stars from the airport. Only Leslie Howard and Victor Fleming chose not to attend: Howard had returned to England due to the outbreak of World War II, and Fleming had fallen out with Selznick and declined to attend any of the premieres. Hattie McDaniel was also absent, as she and the other black cast members were prevented from attending the premiere due to Georgia's Jim Crow laws, which kept them from sitting with their white colleagues. Upon learning that McDaniel had been barred from the premiere, Clark Gable threatened to boycott the event, but McDaniel persuaded him to attend. President Jimmy Carter later recalled it as "the biggest event to happen in the South in my lifetime". Premieres in New York and Los Angeles followed; the latter attended by some of the actresses who had been considered for the part of Scarlett, among them Paulette Goddard, Norma Shearer, and Joan Crawford.

From December 1939 to July 1940, the film played only advance-ticket road show engagements at a limited number of theaters at prices upwards of $1—more than double the price of a regular first-run feature—with MGM collecting an unprecedented 70 percent of the box office receipts, as opposed to the typical 30–35 percent of the period. After reaching saturation as a roadshow, MGM revised its terms to a 50 percent cut and halved the prices before it finally entered general release in 1941 at "popular" prices. Including its distribution and advertising costs, total expenditure was as high as $7 million.

=== Later releases ===
1967 re-release poster

In 1942, Selznick liquidated his company for tax reasons and sold his share in Gone with the Wind to his business partner, John Whitney, for $500,000. In turn, Whitney sold it to MGM for $2.8 million, giving the studio outright ownership of the film. MGM immediately re-released it in early 1942, and again in 1947 and 1954. The 1954 reissue was the first time the film was shown in widescreen, compromising the original Academy ratio and cropping the top and bottom to an aspect ratio of 1.75:1. In doing so, several shots were optically re-framed and cut into the three-strip camera negatives, forever altering five shots.

A 1961 rerelease commemorated the centennial of the start of the Civil War, including a gala "premiere" at the Loew's Grand Theater. It was attended by Selznick and many stars of the film, including Vivien Leigh and Olivia de Havilland; Clark Gable had died the previous year. For its 1967 re-release, the film was blown up to 70mm, and issued with updated poster artwork featuring Gable—with his white shirt ripped open—holding Leigh against a backdrop of orange flames. There were further re-releases in 1971, 1974, and 1989; for the fiftieth-anniversary reissue in 1989, it was given a complete audio and video restoration. It was released in American theaters again in 1998, by Time Warner-owned New Line Cinema.

In 2013, a 4K digital restoration was released in the United Kingdom to coincide with Vivien Leigh's centenary. In 2014, special screenings were scheduled over two days at theaters across the United States to coincide with the film's 75th anniversary, and again over three days in 2024, to celebrate its 85th anniversary.

A re-release in 2026 marked the film's 4K restoration by Warner Brothers, with four days of screenings by Fathom Entertainment across the United States.

=== Television ===
Gone with the Wind premiered on American television on the HBO cable network on June 11, 1976, and played on HBO fourteen times throughout the rest of the month. Other cable channels also broadcast it during June. It made its network television debut in November of that year; NBC paid $5 million for a one-off airing, and it was broadcast in two parts on successive evenings. It became at that time the highest-rated television program ever presented on a single network, watched by 47.5 percent of the households sampled in America, and 65 percent of television viewers, still the record for the highest-rated film to ever air on television.

In 1978, CBS signed a deal worth $35 million to broadcast Gone with the Wind twenty times over twenty years. Turner Entertainment acquired the MGM film library in 1986, but the deal did not include the television rights to Gone with the Wind, which were still held by CBS. An agreement was struck in which the rights were returned to Turner Entertainment, and CBS's broadcast rights to The Wizard of Oz were extended. The film was used to launch two cable channels owned by Turner Broadcasting System: Turner Network Television (1988) and Turner Classic Movies (1994).

=== Home media ===
Gone with the Wind debuted on VHS in March 1985, where it placed second in the sales charts. It has since been released on DVD and Blu-ray formats.

The film was released in 4K digitally and on Ultra HD Blu-ray in November 2026, with three separate physical editions including the standard 4K UHD release, a SteelBook, and a collector's edition sold exclusively through Walmart. There were wide-ranging improvements to both the audio and video.

== Reception ==
=== Critical response ===
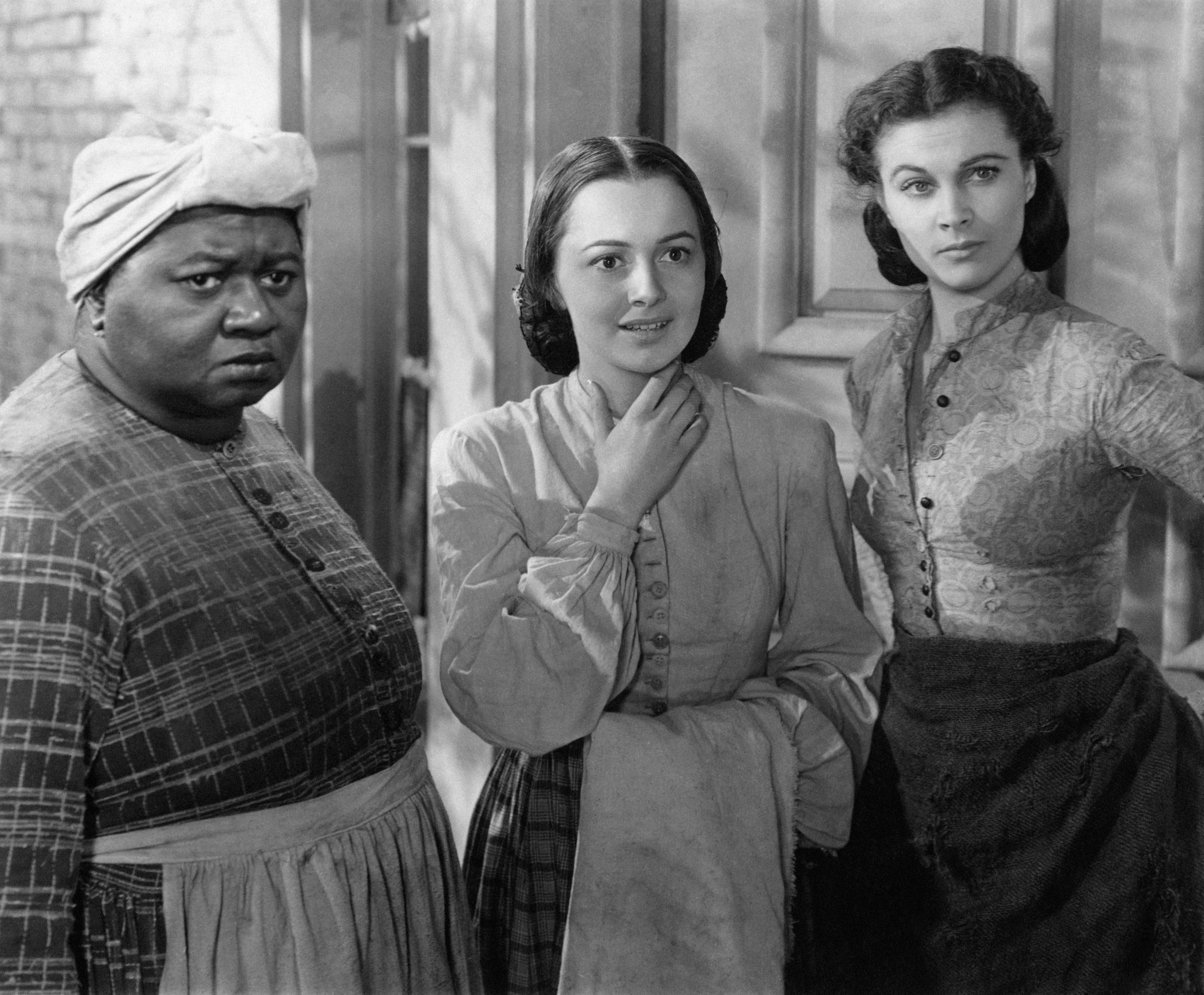
McDaniel, de Havilland, and Leigh were praised for their performances.

Consumer magazines and newspapers generally gave Gone with the Wind excellent reviews. Variety described it as "a great picture poised for grosses which may be second to none in the history of the business". While its production values, technical achievements, and scale of ambition were universally recognized, some reviewers of the time found it lengthy and dramatically unconvincing. Frank S. Nugent of The New York Times wrote that, although it was the most ambitious production to date, it was probably not the greatest ever made; he nonetheless described it as an "interesting story beautifully told". Franz Hoellering of The Nation was of the same opinion: "The result is a film which is a major event in the history of the industry but only a minor achievement in motion-picture art. There are moments when the two categories meet on good terms, but the long stretches between are filled with mere spectacular efficiency."

Although Gone with the Wind was praised for its fidelity to the novel, this was also singled out as the main factor contributing to the lengthy running time. John C. Flinn wrote for Variety that Selznick had "left too much in", and that as entertainment, it would have benefited if repetitious scenes and dialog from the latter part of the story had been trimmed. The Manchester Guardian felt the one serious drawback was that the story lacked the epic quality to justify the outlay of time and found the second half, which focuses on Scarlett's "irrelevant marriages" and "domestic squabbles", mostly superfluous, and the sole reason for their inclusion had been "simply because Margaret Mitchell wrote it that way". The Guardian believed that if "the story had been cut short and tidied up at the point marked by the interval, and if the personal drama had been made subservient to a cinematic treatment of the central theme—the collapse and devastation of the Old South—then Gone With the Wind might have been a really great film". Likewise, Hoellering also found the second half of the film weaker. Identifying the Civil War to be the driving force of the first part while the characters dominate in the second part, he concluded this is where the main fault of the film lay, commenting that "the characters alone do not suffice". Despite many excellent scenes, he considered the drama to be unconvincing and that the "psychological development" had been neglected.

Much of the praise was reserved for the casting, with Vivien Leigh, in particular, being singled out for her performance as Scarlett. Nugent described her as the "pivot of the picture" and believed her to be "so perfectly designed for the part by art and nature that any other actress in the role would be inconceivable". Similarly, Hoellering found her "perfect" in "appearance and movements"; he felt her acting best when she was allowed to "accentuate the split personality she portrays" and thought she was particularly effective in such moments of characterization like the morning after the marital rape scene. Flinn also found Leigh suited to the role physically and felt she was best in the scenes where she displays courage and determination, such as the escape from Atlanta and when Scarlett kills a Yankee deserter. Leigh won in the Best Actress category for her performance at the 1939 New York Film Critics Circle Awards. Of Clark Gable's performance as Rhett Butler, Flinn felt the characterization was "as close to Miss Mitchell's conception—and the audience's—as might be imagined", a view which Nugent concurred with, although Hoellering felt that Gable did not quite convince in the closing scenes, as Rhett walks out on Scarlett in disgust. Of the other principal cast members, both Hoellering and Flinn found Leslie Howard to be "convincing" as the weak-willed Ashley, with Flinn identifying Olivia de Havilland as a "standout" as Melanie; Nugent was also especially taken with de Havilland's performance, describing it as a "gracious, dignified, tender gem of characterization". Hattie McDaniel's performance as Mammy was singled out for praise by many critics: Nugent believed she gave the best performance after Vivien Leigh, with Flinn placing it third after Leigh's and Gable's performances.

=== Academy Awards ===
At the 12th Academy Awards, Gone with the Wind set a record for Academy Award wins and nominations, winning in eight of the competitive categories it was nominated in, from a total of thirteen nominations. It won for Best Picture, Best Actress, Best Supporting Actress, Best Director, Best Screenplay, Best Cinematography, Best Art Direction, and Best Editing, and received two further honorary awards for its use of equipment and color (it also became the first color film to win Best Picture).

The record of eight competitive wins stood until Gigi (1958) won nine, and its overall record of ten was broken by Ben-Hur (1959) which won eleven. Gone with the Wind also held the record for most nominations until All About Eve (1950) secured fourteen. It was the longest American sound film made up to that point, and may still hold the record of the longest Best Picture winner depending on how it is interpreted. The running time for Gone with the Wind is just under 221 minutes, while Lawrence of Arabia (1962) runs for just over 222 minutes; however, including the overture, intermission, entr'acte, and exit music, Gone with the Wind lasts for 234 minutes (although some sources put its full length at 238 minutes) while Lawrence of Arabia comes in slightly shorter at 232 minutes with its additional components.

Hattie McDaniel became the first African-American to win an Academy Award—beating out her co-star Olivia de Havilland, who was also nominated in the same category—but was racially segregated from her co-stars at the awards ceremony at the Coconut Grove; she and her escort were made to sit at a separate table at the back of the room. Meanwhile, screenwriter Sidney Howard became the first posthumous Oscar winner and Selznick personally received the Irving G. Thalberg Memorial Award for his career achievements.

Academy Awards and nominations
Award	Recipient(s)	Result
Outstanding Production	Selznick International Pictures	Won
Best Director	Victor Fleming	Won
Best Actor	Clark Gable	Nominated
Best Actress	Vivien Leigh	Won
Best Supporting Actress	Olivia de Havilland	Nominated
Best Supporting Actress	Hattie McDaniel	Won
Best Screenplay	Sidney Howard	Won
Best Art Direction	Lyle Wheeler	Won
Best Cinematography – Color	Ernest Haller and Ray Rennahan	Won
Best Film Editing	Hal C. Kern and James E. Newcom	Won
Best Original Score	Max Steiner	Nominated
Best Sound Recording	Thomas T. Moulton (Samuel Goldwyn Studio Sound Department)	Nominated
Best Visual Effects	Jack Cosgrove, Fred Albin and Arthur Johns	Nominated
Special Award	William Cameron Menzies; For outstanding achievement in the use of color for the enhancement of dramatic mood in the production of Gone with the Wind.	Honorary
Technical Achievement Award	Don Musgrave and Selznick International Pictures; For pioneering in the use of coordinated equipment in the production Gone with the Wind.	Honorary

=== Reactions from African-Americans ===
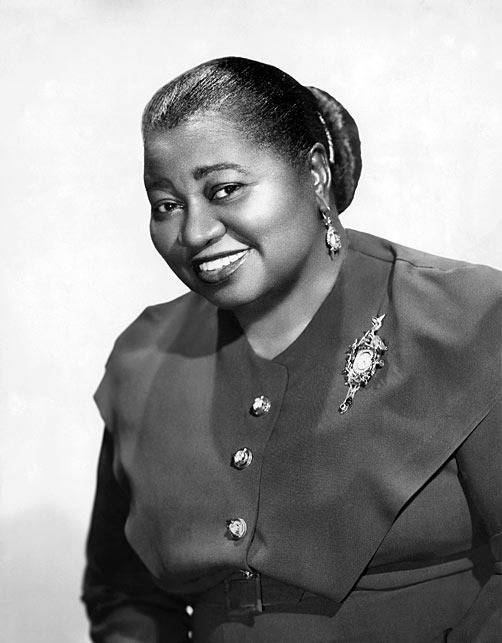
Hattie McDaniel, the first African-American Oscar winner

African-American commentators have criticized Gone with the Wind since its release for the film's depiction of black people and "whitewashing" of slavery; contemporary white newspapers did not report on such criticism. Carlton Moss, a black dramatist, wrote in an open letter that whereas The Birth of a Nation was a "frontal attack on American history and the Negro people", Gone with the Wind was a "rear attack on the same". He went on to characterize the latter film as a "nostalgic plea for sympathy for a still-living cause of Southern reaction". Moss further called out the stereotypical black characterizations, such as the "shiftless and dull-witted Pork", the "indolent and thoroughly irresponsible Prissy", Big Sam's "radiant acceptance of slavery", and Mammy with her "constant haranguing and doting on every wish of Scarlett". Similarly, the black poet and educator Melvin B. Tolson wrote that while, "Birth of a Nation was such a barefaced lie that a moron could see through it. Gone with the Wind is such a subtle lie that it will be swallowed as truth by millions of whites and blacks alike."

Following Hattie McDaniel's Oscar win, Walter Francis White, the leader of the National Association for the Advancement of Colored People, accused her of being an Uncle Tom. McDaniel responded that she would "rather make seven hundred dollars a week playing a maid than seven dollars being one"; she further questioned White's qualification to speak on behalf of black people since he was light-skinned and only one-eighth black. Opinion on the film in the wider African-American community was divided. Gone with the Wind was called by some a "weapon of terror against black America" and an insult to black audiences, and demonstrations were held in various cities. Malcolm X recalled that "when Butterfly McQueen went into her act, I felt like crawling under the rug". For her part, McQueen was initially unhappy with playing a slave, having expected Selznick to update the novel's story. "But he was very authentic with the script," she recalled in 1989. "I'm glad now that he was, because you can look at the film and see history as it was. You can see where we've come." Some sections of the black community recognized McDaniel's achievements to be representative of progress; some African-Americans crossed picket lines and praised McDaniel's warm and witty characterization, and others hoped that the industry's recognition of her work would lead to increased visibility on screen for other black actors. In its editorial congratulation to McDaniel on winning her Academy Award, Opportunity: A Journal of Negro Life used Gone with the Wind as a reminder of the "limit" put on black aspiration by old prejudices.

=== Audience response ===
Gone with the Wind broke attendance records everywhere. At the Capitol Theatre in New York alone, it averaged eleven thousand admissions per day in late December, and within four years of its release had sold an estimated sixty million tickets across the United States—sales equivalent to just under half the population at the time. It repeated its success overseas, and was a sensational hit during the Blitz in London, opening in April 1940 and playing for four years at the Little Ritz in Leicester Square. By the time MGM withdrew it from circulation at the end of 1943, its worldwide distribution had returned a gross rental (the studio's share of the box office gross) of $32 million, making it the most profitable film ever made up to that point. It eventually opened in Japan in September 1952 and became the highest-grossing foreign film there.

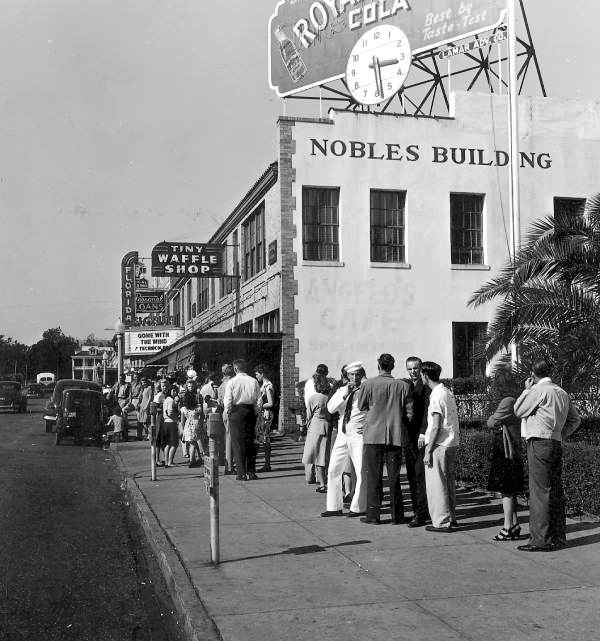
Line up to see Gone with the Wind in Pensacola, Florida (1947)

The international response to Gone with the Wind was volatile, and its immense scale and emotional resonance provoked political intervention. It was banned in Nazi-occupied Europe, although it was reportedly being favored by government officials. Despite the prohibition, copies were smuggled into occupied territories for private screenings, to the dismay of propaganda authorities. In early 1942 Tokyo, a select group of Japanese military officers and filmmakers viewed a double feature of Gone with the Wind and Disney's Snow White and the Seven Dwarfs, both obtained after the British surrender in Singapore. Despite Japan's early wartime successes, the advanced technology and production quality of these films caused despair among the viewers, who questioned how Japan could possibly defeat a nation capable of such cinematic achievements. At a gala premiere attended by approximately 2,500 people in the Soviet Union, Gone with the Wind resonated deeply with audiences amid the country's own period of upheaval. Viewer Nelli Bersineva noted "Scarlett definitely has a Russian character." Leningrad mayor Anatoly A. Sobchak highlighted the contemporary relevance, saying "we see how American people lived through their war and changed their lives".

Even though it earned its investors roughly twice as much as the previous record-holder, The Birth of a Nation, the box-office performances of the two films were likely much closer. The bulk of the earnings from Gone with the Wind came from its roadshow and first-run engagements, where the distributor received 70 percent and 50 percent of the box-office gross, respectively, rather than its general release, which at the time typically saw the distributor's share set at 30–35 percent of the gross. In the case of The Birth of a Nation, its distributor, Epoch, sold off many of its distribution territories on a "states rights" basis—which typically amounted to 10 percent of the box-office gross—and Epoch's accounts are only indicative of its own profits from the film, and not the local distributors. Carl E. Milliken, secretary of the Motion Picture Producers and Distributors Association, estimated that The Birth of a Nation had been seen by fifty million people by 1930.

When re-released in 1947, it earned a $5 million rental in the United States and Canada and was one of the year's top ten releases. Successful re-releases in 1954 and 1961 enabled it to retain its position as the industry's top earner, despite substantial challenges from more recent films such as Ben-Hur, but it was finally overtaken by The Sound of Music in 1966.

The 1967 reissue was unusual because MGM chose to roadshow it, which turned it into the most successful re-release in the industry's history. It generated a box-office gross of $68 million, making it MGM's most lucrative film after Doctor Zhivago from the latter half of the decade. MGM earned a rental of $41 million from the release, with the U.S. and Canadian share amounting to over $30 million, placing it second only to The Graduate for that year. Including its $6.7 million rental from the 1961 reissue, it was the fourth highest-earner of the decade in the North American market, with only The Sound of Music, The Graduate and Doctor Zhivago making more for their distributors. A further re-release in 1971 allowed it to briefly recapture the record from The Sound of Music, bringing its total worldwide gross rental to about $116 million by the end of 1971—more than trebling its earnings from its initial release—before losing the record again the following year to The Godfather.

Across all releases, it is estimated that Gone with the Wind has sold over 200 million tickets in the United States and Canada, generating more theater admissions in that territory than any other film. The film was phenomenally successful in Western Europe too, generating approximately 35 million tickets in the United Kingdom and over 16 million in France, respectively becoming the biggest and sixth-biggest ticket-sellers in those markets. Its appeal has endured overseas, sustaining a popularity similar to its domestic longevity; in 1975 it played to capacity audiences every night during the first three weeks of its run at London's Plaza 2 Theatre, and in Japan it generated over half a million admissions at twenty theaters during a five-week engagement. In total, Gone with the Wind grossed over $390 million globally at the box office; in 2007 Turner Entertainment estimated the gross to be equivalent to approximately $3.3 billion when adjusted for inflation to current prices; Guinness World Records arrived at a figure of $3.44 billion in 2014 making it the most successful film in cinema history.

Gone with the Wind remains popular with audiences into the 21st century, having been voted the most popular film in two nationwide polls of Americans undertaken by Harris Interactive in 2008, and again in 2014. The market research firm surveyed over two thousand U.S. adults, with the results weighted by age, sex, race/ethnicity, education, region, and household income, so their proportions matched the composition of the adult population.

=== Critical re-evaluation ===
AFI 100 Years... series

- AFI's 100 Years...100 Movies – #4
- AFI's 100 Years...100 Passions – #2
- AFI's 100 Years...100 Movie Quotes:
  - "Frankly, my dear, I don't give a damn." – #1
  - "After all, tomorrow is another day!" – #31
  - "As God is my witness, I'll never be hungry again." – #59
- AFI's 100 Years of Film Scores – #2
- AFI's 100 Years...100 Cheers – #43
- AFI's 100 Years...100 Movies (10th Anniversary Edition) – #6
- AFI's 10 Top 10 – #4 Epic film

— American Film Institute

When revisiting Gone with the Wind in the 1970s, Arthur M. Schlesinger Jr. believed that Hollywood films generally age well, revealing an unexpected depth or integrity, but in the case of Gone with the Wind time has not treated it kindly. Richard Schickel argued that one measure of a film's quality is to ask what the viewer can remember of it, and the film falls down in this regard: unforgettable imagery and dialogue are not present. Stanley Kauffmann, likewise, also found the film to be a largely forgettable experience, claiming he could only remember two scenes vividly. Both Schickel and Schlesinger put this down to it being "badly written", in turn describing the dialogue as "flowery" and possessing a "picture postcard" sensibility. Schickel also believes the film fails as popular art in that it has limited rewatch value—a sentiment that Kauffmann also concurs with, stating that having watched it twice he hopes "never to see it again: twice is twice as much as any lifetime needs". Both Schickel and Andrew Sarris identify the film's main failing is in possessing a producer's sensibility rather than an artistic one: having gone through so many directors and writers the film does not carry a sense of being "created" or "directed", but rather having emerged "steaming from the crowded kitchen", where the main creative force was a producer's obsession in making the film as literally faithful to the novel as possible.

Sarris concedes that despite its artistic failings, the film does hold a mandate around the world as the "single most beloved entertainment ever produced". Judith Crist observes that, kitsch aside, the film is "undoubtedly still the best and most durable piece of popular entertainment to have come off the Hollywood assembly lines", the product of a showman with "taste and intelligence". Schlesinger notes that the first half of the film does have a "sweep and vigor" that aspire to its epic theme, but agreed with criticisms of the personal lives taking over in the second half, and how it ends up losing its theme in unconvincing sentimentality. Kauffmann also finds interesting parallels with The Godfather, which had just replaced Gone with the Wind as the highest-grosser at the time: both were produced from "ultra-American" best-selling novels, both live within codes of honor that are romanticized, and both in essence offer cultural fabrication or revisionism.

The critical perception of the film has shifted in the intervening years, which resulted in it being ranked 235th in Sight & Sound's prestigious decennial critics poll in 2012, and in 2015 sixty-two international film critics polled by the BBC voted it the 97th best American film. To commemorate the twentieth anniversary of Turner Classic Movies (TCM) in 2014, the channel chose again to screen Gone with the Wind, the first film ever broadcast on TCM. Discussing its re-release into theaters that year, film historian and TCM host Robert Osborne stated, "The amazing thing to me is that Gone with the Wind has endured and triumphed even in a very changed world 75 years later. It still affects people in the same way as it did then."

=== Industry recognition ===
The film has featured in several high-profile industry polls. It was selected as the greatest film of the past half-century in a 1950 poll conducted by Variety of more than 200 professionals who had worked in the film industry for over 25 years. In 1977 it was voted the most popular film by the American Film Institute (AFI), in a poll of the organization's membership; the AFI also ranked the film fourth on its "100 Greatest Movies" list in 1998, with it slipping down to sixth place in the tenth anniversary edition in 2007. In 2014, it placed fifteenth in an extensive poll undertaken by The Hollywood Reporter, which balloted every studio, agency, publicity firm and production house in the Hollywood region. Film directors ranked it 322nd in the 2012 edition of the decennial Sight & Sound poll, and in 2016 it was selected as the ninth best "directorial achievement" in a Directors Guild of America members poll. In 2006, the Writers Guild of America voted its screenplay twenty-third in its list of 101 greatest screenplays.

Gone with the Wind was one of the twenty-five inaugural films selected for preservation in the National Film Registry by the United States Library of Congress in 1989 for being "culturally, historically, or aesthetically significant".

== Analysis and controversies ==
=== Historical portrayal ===
Though not always historically precise, Gone with the Wind largely captured the spirit and ethos of the era it depicts. Producer David Selznick wrote "I am most sensitive to the feelings of minority people", and assured his avoidance of promoting intolerance during fascist times. Nevertheless, the film has been criticized as having perpetuated Civil War myths and black stereotypes. David Reynolds wrote that, "The white women are elegant, their menfolk are noble or at least dashing. And, in the background, the black slaves are mostly dutiful and content, clearly incapable of an independent existence." Reynolds likened Gone with the Wind to The Birth of a Nation and other re-imaginings of the South made during the era of segregation, in which white Southerners are portrayed as defending traditional values, and the issue of slavery is largely ignored. The film has been described as a "regression" that promotes both the myth of the black rapist and the honorable and defensive role of the Ku Klux Klan during Reconstruction, and as a "social propaganda" film offering a "white supremacist" view of the past.

From 1972 to 1996, the Atlanta Historical Society held several Gone with the Wind exhibits, among them a 1994 exhibit which was titled "Disputed Territories: Gone with the Wind and Southern Myths". One of the questions that was explored by the exhibit was "How True to Life Were the Slaves in GWTW?". This section showed that slave experiences were diverse and, as a result, it concluded that the "happy darky" was a myth, as was the belief that all slaves experienced violence and brutality. W. Bryan Rommel Ruiz has argued that despite factual inaccuracies in depicting the Reconstruction period, Gone with the Wind reflects contemporary interpretations of it that were common in the early 20th century. One such viewpoint is reflected in a brief scene in which Mammy fends off a leering freedman: a politician can be heard offering "forty acres and a mule" to the emancipated slaves in exchange for their votes. The inference is taken to mean that freedmen are ignorant about politics and unprepared for freedom, unwittingly becoming the tools of corrupt Reconstruction officials. The phrase "forty acres and a mule" originated with a wartime order proclaimed by General William Tecumseh Sherman, and has come to symbolize the broken promise that Reconstruction policies would offer economic justice for African Americans.

According Rommel-Ruiz, while perpetuating some Lost Cause myths, the film makes concessions with regard to others. After Scarlett is attacked in the shanty town by a white man and his black accomplice (and saved by her former slave), a group of men—including Ashley and Scarlett's husband Frank—raid the town; in the novel, they belong to the Ku Klux Klan, representing the common trope of protecting the white woman's virtue, but Rommel Ruiz argues that the filmmakers consciously neutralize the presence of the Klan in the film by simply referring to it as a "political meeting". Katherine H. Lee writes, "the Klan's presence in the novel is excised from the film—becoming the vigilante group that avenges the attack on Scarlett by changing the race of the attackers from the novel", (Note: In this respect, Lee's appraisal is incorrect as the film does not change the race of the attackers. As in the novel, the attack is instigated by a white man, assisted by a black man. However, in the film Scarlett is sexually assaulted by the white man, whereas in the novel it is the black man who gropes her.) but characterizes the film as "undeniably racist". Richard Alleva remarks that, in the film, "a black man merely restrains Scarlett's horse while his white companion (in a memorable close-up) lowers his leering face toward the unconscious heroine; soon a faithful former slave appears and fights off both attackers. But in the novel, the would-be rapist is black while the white man holds the horse ... Selznick mollified Mitchell's racism throughout." Jennifer Schuessler of The New York Times quotes a memo where Selznick wrote, "A group of men can go out and 'get' the perpetrators of an attempted rape without having long white sheets over them." According to film historian Thomas Cripps, Selznick "excised all references to the Ku Klux Klan, renegade Negroes and Southern legends." Cripps also quotes a memorandum written by Selznick: "I personally feel quite strongly that we should cut out the Klan entirely ... [otherwise, the film] might come out as an unintentional advertisement for intolerant societies in these fascist-ridden times." A solution was to rewrite the rape scene and make (quoting Selznick again) "the negro little more than a spectator."

Thomas Cripps reasons that in some respects, the film undercuts racial stereotypes; in particular, the film created greater engagement between Hollywood and black audiences, with dozens of films making small gestures in recognition of the emerging trend. Only a few weeks after its initial run, a story editor at Warner wrote a memorandum to Walter Wanger about Mississippi Belle, a script that contained the worst excesses of plantation films, suggesting that Gone with the Wind had made the film "unproducible". More than any film since The Birth of a Nation, it unleashed a variety of social forces that foreshadowed an alliance of white liberals and black people who encouraged the expectation that black people would one day achieve equality. According to Cripps, the film eventually became a template for measuring social change.

=== 21st-century reappraisal ===
In the 21st century, criticism of the film's depictions of race and slavery curtailed its availability. In 2017, Gone with the Wind was pulled from the schedule at the Orpheum Theatre in Memphis, Tennessee after a 34-year run of annual showings. On June 9, 2020, the film was removed from HBO Max in response to an op-ed written by screenwriter John Ridley that was published in that day's edition of the Los Angeles Times, which called for the streaming service to temporarily remove the film from its content library. He wrote that "it continues to give cover to those who falsely claim that clinging to the iconography of the plantation era is a matter of 'heritage, not hate'". A spokesperson for HBO Max said that the film was "a product of its time" and as a result, it depicted "ethnic and racial prejudices" that "were wrong then and are wrong today". It was also announced that the film would return to the streaming service at a later date, although it would incorporate "a discussion of its historical context and a denouncement of those very depictions, but will be presented as it was originally created because to do otherwise would be the same as claiming these prejudices never existed. If we are to create a more just, equitable, and inclusive future, we must first acknowledge and understand our history."

The film's removal sparked a debate, with film critics and historians criticizing HBO as engaging in censorship. Following its withdrawal, the film reached the top of Amazon's best-sellers sales chart for TV and films, and fifth place on Apple's iTunes Store film chart. HBO Max returned the film to its service later that month, with a new introduction by Jacqueline Stewart. Stewart described the film, in an op-ed for CNN, as "a prime text for examining expressions of white supremacy in popular culture", and said that "it is precisely because of the ongoing, painful patterns of racial injustice and disregard for Black lives that Gone with the Wind should stay in circulation and remain available for viewing, analysis and discussion". She described the controversy as "an opportunity to think about what classic films can teach us".

At a political rally in February 2020, President Donald Trump criticized the 92nd Academy Awards ceremony, stating that Gone with the Wind and Sunset Boulevard (1950) were more deserving of the award for Best Picture than that year's winner, the South Korean film Parasite. His comments elicited commentary from critics, and a writer for Entropy magazine opined that they had sparked a backlash from pundits across the political spectrum on social media.

=== Depiction of marital rape ===
One of the most notorious and widely condemned scenes in Gone with the Wind depicts what is now legally defined as marital rape. The scene begins with Scarlett and Rhett at the bottom of the staircase, where he begins to kiss her, refusing to be told "no" by the struggling Scarlett; Rhett ignores her resistance, scolds her and carries her up the stairs to the bedroom, and "viewers know that impetuous, strong-willed Scarlett is going to get what's coming to her". The next scene, the following morning, shows Scarlett glowing with barely suppressed sexual satisfaction; Rhett apologizes for his behavior, blaming it on his drinking. The scene has been accused of combining romance and rape by making them indistinguishable from each other, and of reinforcing a notion about forced sex: that women secretly enjoy it, and it is an acceptable way for a man to treat his wife.

Film critic Molly Haskell has argued that, nevertheless, for women who are uncritical of the scene, it is by and large consistent with what they have in mind if they fantasize about being raped. Their fantasies revolve around love and romance rather than forced sex; they will assume that Scarlett was not an unwilling sexual partner and wanted Rhett to take the initiative and insist on having sexual intercourse.

== Legacy ==
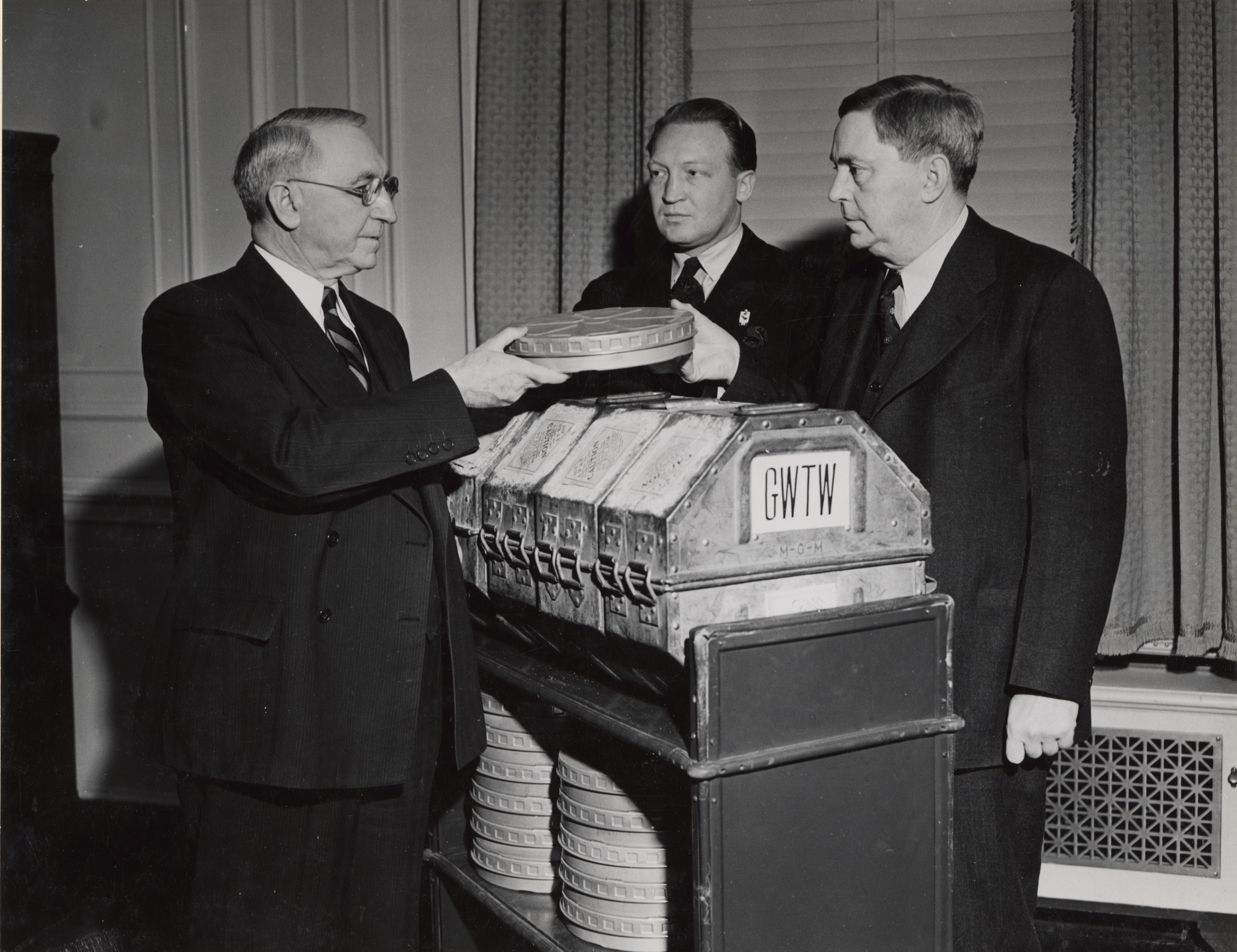
First Archivist of the United States R. D. W. Connor (center) receiving the film Gone with the Wind from Senator Walter F. George of Georgia (left) and Loew's Eastern Division Manager Carter Barron (right), 1941

=== In popular culture ===
Gone with the Wind and its production have been explicitly referenced, satirized, dramatized, and analyzed on numerous occasions across a range of media, from contemporaneous works such as Second Fiddle—a 1939 film spoofing the "search for Scarlett"—to current television shows, such as The Simpsons. The Scarlett O'Hara War (a 1980 television dramatization of the casting of Scarlett), Moonlight and Magnolias (a 2007 play by Ron Hutchinson that dramatizes Ben Hecht's five-day re-write of the script), and "Went with the Wind!" (a sketch on The Carol Burnett Show that parodied the film in the aftermath of its television debut in 1976) are among the more noteworthy examples of its enduring presence in popular culture. It was also the subject of a 1988 documentary, The Making of a Legend: Gone with the Wind, detailing the film's difficult production history. In 1990, the United States Postal Service issued a stamp depicting Clark Gable and Vivien Leigh embracing in a scene from the film. In 2003, Leigh and Gable (as Scarlett and Rhett) were ranked number 95 on VH1's list of the "200 Greatest Pop Culture Icons of All Time".

The film's release is considered the catalyst in establishing "Scarlett" as a feminine given name, shifting its identity away from the bright red hue. Although the name first appeared in limited numbers following the publication of Margaret Mitchell's novel, it was the film's extraordinary reach and longevity that brought the name into mainstream public consciousness. U.S. birth records show its usage increased more than seven-fold immediately after the film's release, with continued gradual growth in subsequent decades.

Gone with the Wind has gone on to develop a cult following, known as "the Windies", who follow the latest news and events surrounding the book and film. They are avid collectors of memorabilia and periodically gather for events, usually in Atlanta, wearing costumes based on the film or dressed as Margaret Mitchell.

=== Sequel ===
Following the publication of her novel, Margaret Mitchell was inundated with requests for a sequel, but she claimed not to have a notion of what happened to Scarlett and Rhett, and as a result, she had "left them to their ultimate fate". Until her death in 1949, Mitchell continued to resist pressure from Selznick and MGM to write a sequel. In 1975, her brother, Stephens Mitchell (who assumed control of her estate), authorized a sequel that would be jointly produced by MGM and the Zanuck/Brown Company (through their deal with Universal Studios) on a budget of $12 million. Anne Edwards was commissioned to write the sequel as a novel, which would then be adapted into a screenplay and published in conjunction with the film's release. Edwards submitted a 775-page manuscript which was titled Tara, The Continuation of Gone with the Wind, set between 1872 and 1882 and focusing on Scarlett's divorce from Rhett. James Goldman was hired to adapt it for the screen, which led to the story being taken in a new direction; whilst Zanuck-Brown was satisfied with Goldman's script, MGM vetoed it, and the deal collapsed.

The idea was revived in the 1990s when a sequel was finally produced in 1994 in the form of a television miniseries. Scarlett was based on the novel by Alexandra Ripley, itself a sequel to Mitchell's book. British actors Joanne Whalley and Timothy Dalton were cast as Scarlett and Rhett, and the series follows Scarlett's relocation to Ireland after she again becomes pregnant by Rhett.

== See also ==
- Golden Age of Hollywood
- List of films and television shows about the American Civil War
- List of films featuring slavery
