= Scarlett Westbrook =

British Climate Activist

- Born: 8 July 2004 (age 20); Birmingham, U.K.
- Occupations: Climate justice activist; Journalist; Student
- Movement: Teach the Future; School Strike for Climate; UK Student Climate Network

Scarlett Westbrook (born 8 July 2004) is a British climate justice activist and journalist.

She is noted for her work in climate and education policy, and was the youngest regular policy writer in Parliamentary history. She is a spokesperson and coordinator with the UK Student Climate Network, head of political engagement at Teach the Future, a prominent figure in the Fridays for Future movement, and a spokesperson for Labour for a Green New Deal.

As a journalist, Westbrook has written for The Independent, gal-dem, the Metro and i-D.

== Early life ==
Westbrook grew up in Birmingham. She was the youngest person in the world to obtain an A Level in Government and Politics, which she self-taught in 2018, aged 13. Westbrook rose to prominence for journalism discussing Brexit and youth political engagement, beginning in December 2018 with an article that tackled the underrepresentation of youth in UK politics.

== Climate activism ==
Beginning in 2019, Westbrook became involved in climate justice activism. She co-organised Birmingham's first school strike for climate action, before joining the UK Student Climate Network as a coordinator for community engagement, political outreach and organising around the Green New Deal. She helped to organise Birmingham climate strikes in March and May 2019, writing about the protests in The Independent ahead of the May global climate strike. She continued to organise climate strike marches in Birmingham, London and across the UK.

Westbrook became involved with the daughter organisation of the UK Student Climate Network, Teach the Future, and was appointed as Head of Political Engagement. Through Teach the Future, Westbrook authored the first ever student-written bill, the English Climate Emergency Education Act. In February 2020 Westbrook organised and spoke at the Parliamentary Reception for the English Climate Emergency Education Act, receiving praise from MPs across the House.

In November 2021, the English Climate Education Emergency Bill was presented to Parliament by the MP Nadia Whittome. Westbrook was interviewed about this first reading of the bill by i-D Magazine, stating "By starting with climate education, and by starting with decarbonising schools, we're creating a legacy of climate justice. That means we can continue action, and it's sustainable, and continuous, and, hopefully, better for education." The bill is set to have its second reading on 6 May 2022.

Westbrook has appeared at high-profile events and on national television, including an interview in 2019 on BBC Breakfast alongside Greta Thunberg, discussing the Global Climate Strike and the Green New Deal. She was also interviewed by ITV to discuss the petition for the leaders of the major political parties to hold a televised debate focused on the climate crisis ahead of the 2019 General Election, which she helped to launch as a spokesperson for the UK Student Climate Network. She said, "We can't really be guided by what's deemed to be politically possible, when we need what's scientifically necessary. Politics by definition is the process by which conflict is resolved and this is arguably the biggest crisis we've ever faced." In response, Channel 4 held the 'Emergency on Planet Earth' debate of party leaders on 28 November 2019. This was the first ever party leaders’ debate focused exclusively on climate change in the UK.

In 2020, Westbrook headlined the International Women's Day march led by Care International in London, where she outlined the links between climate justice and justice for women, especially those living in the Global South. She was the youngest-ever headline speaker at a Care International International Women's Day mobilisation.

Westbrook appeared again on BBC Breakfast on 25 February 2020 to introduce the Teach the Future campaign. In June 2021, Westbrook was interviewed for Sky News about climate anxiety and her research that found that only four percent of students felt they knew enough about the climate crisis. She said "We need the knowledge to be able to deal with this post-climate breakdown world that we're going to be entering, as we exit university and schooling and into the workforce."

In July 2020, Westbrook spoke at the Children's Media Conference and was named as one of Greenpeace's 30 Under 30 climate activists, and on 23 September 2020 she won the Institute for Public Policy Research 'Big Ideas' policy event. She went on to be the youngest person ever longlisted for the Merky Books writing prize in December 2020, and in February 2021 she became the youngest ever recipient of the Women of the Future Young Star award. In November 2020 she was named as one of Forbes Top 100 UK Environmentalists.

In 2021, Westbrook received the prestigious Diana Award for her journalism and environmental activism and was named 'one of the UK's most high profile youth activists' by Sky.

In November 2021 Westbrook attended COP26 in Glasgow, and her subsequent column 'Young people like me have made history this COP26 'youth day' – now it's your turn' in the Independent was featured in The Week's list of best opinion columns. Ahead of the conference, she was profiled in The Observer New Review, the Evening Standard, and National Geographic.
