= UK Student Climate Network =

English and Welsh environmental organisation

- UKSCN's current logo, designed in March 2019.
- Successor: Climate Live; Teach the Future
- Founded: 1 December 2018; 7 years ago
- Founder: Anna Taylor, Ivi Hohmann, and Daniela Torres Perez.
- Founded at: London, England, United Kingdom
- Dissolved: June 2023; 2 years ago
- Type: Student-led environmental organisation
- Purpose: Climate change mitigation and Youth voice
- Region served: England and Wales, previously Northern Ireland
- Volunteers: >7 (as of April 2021)
- Website: www.ukscn.org

UK Student Climate Network (UKSCN) was a student-led climate justice organisation operating in England and Wales founded by Anna Taylor, then aged 17, on 1 December 2018, along with Ivi Hohmann and Daniela Torres Perez. It disbanded in 2020, with only a few members left who acted as caretakers for the organisation’s remaining funds, before finally dissolving in 2023.

UKSCN were a group of mainly under 18s who called for strikes from school since February 2019, as part of the Youth Strike 4 Climate movement, with the ambition of getting the Government of the United Kingdom and the Welsh Government to take action on the climate crisis by fulfilling their demands. Their strikes have seen thousands of students across England and Wales, with Fridays For Future Scotland, and Youth Climate Association Northern Ireland organising youth climate strikes in Scotland, and Northern Ireland respectively, leave or not go to school on Fridays.

== Demands ==
The network had four demands:

DEMAND 1-SAVE THE FUTURE The Government is to declare a climate emergency and implement a Green New Deal to achieve Climate Justice.

DEMAND 2-TEACH THE FUTURE The education system must be repurposed and reformed around the climate emergency to better teach young people about its urgency, severity, scientific basis and methods of mitigation. This demand has now evolved into the Teach the Future England campaign which is supported by the School Group Developmental working group as well as SOS-UK and various partner organisations.

DEMAND 3-TELL THE FUTURE The Government communicate the severity of the ecological crisis and the necessity to act now to the general public.

DEMAND 4-EMPOWER THE FUTURE

Young people must be included in policy making, and no one should be excluded from participation in our democracy on the basis of age, citizenship, permanent address, incarceration or anything else. For as long as UK democracy is conducted through a representative system, everyone living in the UK over the age of 16 must have the right to vote in elections, conducted via proportional representation, so that everyone's vote is reflected in our government and is worth the same.

== Structure ==
The organisation was divided into the regional groups of: South East, South West, Midlands, North East, North West, Wales and, from July 2019, London. UKSCN was part of the Youth Strike 4 Climate movement in England and Wales. The rest of the UK is covered by separate organisations, in Scotland by Fridays For Future Scotland, in Northern Ireland by the Youth Climate Association Northern Ireland (YCANI). YCANI previously were affiliated with UKSCN, however, split away from the group due to cultural, legal and political differences between the two groups’ respective operating countries. FFF Scotland were asked to join UKSCN soon after the founding of both organisations, however, declined for similar reasons.

Isle of Man Student Climate Network are a separate group who organise strikes in the Isle of Man, a Crown Dependency of the United Kingdom. Isle of Man Student Climate Network coordinates with UKSCN, but are an independent organisation, founded in March 2019 by Ciara Sowerby, Archibald Elliott and Emily Thompson.

UKSCN did not directly organise strikes, but acted as a network for over 120 active local groups and strikes in over 300 locations around England and Wales. It had a national organising team that was split into several working groups that took part in campaigns and worked with other movements. The number of volunteers assisting the group grew from around 30 in early March 2019 to an estimate of 300 by the end of April that year. In addition, it provided a platform for connection to around 350 youth strikers, whom are unaffiliated to the group specifically.

== History ==
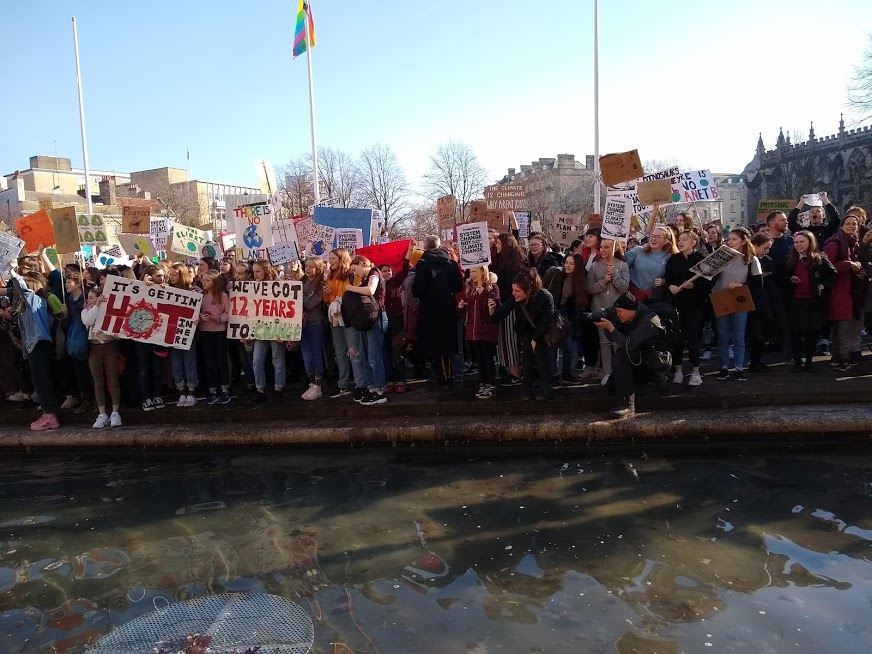
Youth Strikers in Bristol in February 2019

UKSCN's first strike was held on 15 February 2019, under the name YouthStrike4Climate. It saw 15,000 English and Welsh school students strike from schools in protest, with strikes in Scotland and Northern Ireland organised by different organisations.

This was followed by a second strike on 15 March 2019 which was coordinated with global Youth Strike 4 Climate protests that were held across the world, which saw 1.6 million students go on strike. The organisation's demonstrations have grown in popularity, with an estimated total of 20,000 people in attendance at the demonstration held outside Parliament Square in London on 15 March and 50,000 across England and Wales. The strikes are in solidarity with other Youth Strike 4 Climate protests taking place across the world.

Strikes have since taken place on:

- 12 April 2019
- 24 May 2019
- 21 June 2019
- 19 July 2019
- 20 September 2019 which was a general strike of adults and students; this was the largest climate mobilisation in UK history with an estimated 100,000 people in London alone and an estimated 300,000 people at strikes across the UK.
- 29 November 2019
- 14 February 2020
- Digital strikes under lockdown

The only nationally coordinated strikes of 2020 were on 17 January and 14 February. Local group Bristol Youth Strike 4 Climate organised and held a strike on 28 February 2020 that was attended by over 30,000 people along with Greta Thunberg. Any further demonstrations were paused due to the COVID-19 pandemic; however, youth strikers have been engaging in online actions such as Fridays for Future Digital and Polluters Out's Twitter Storm.
