= Teach the Future =

UK educational initiative

- Teach the Future Campaign
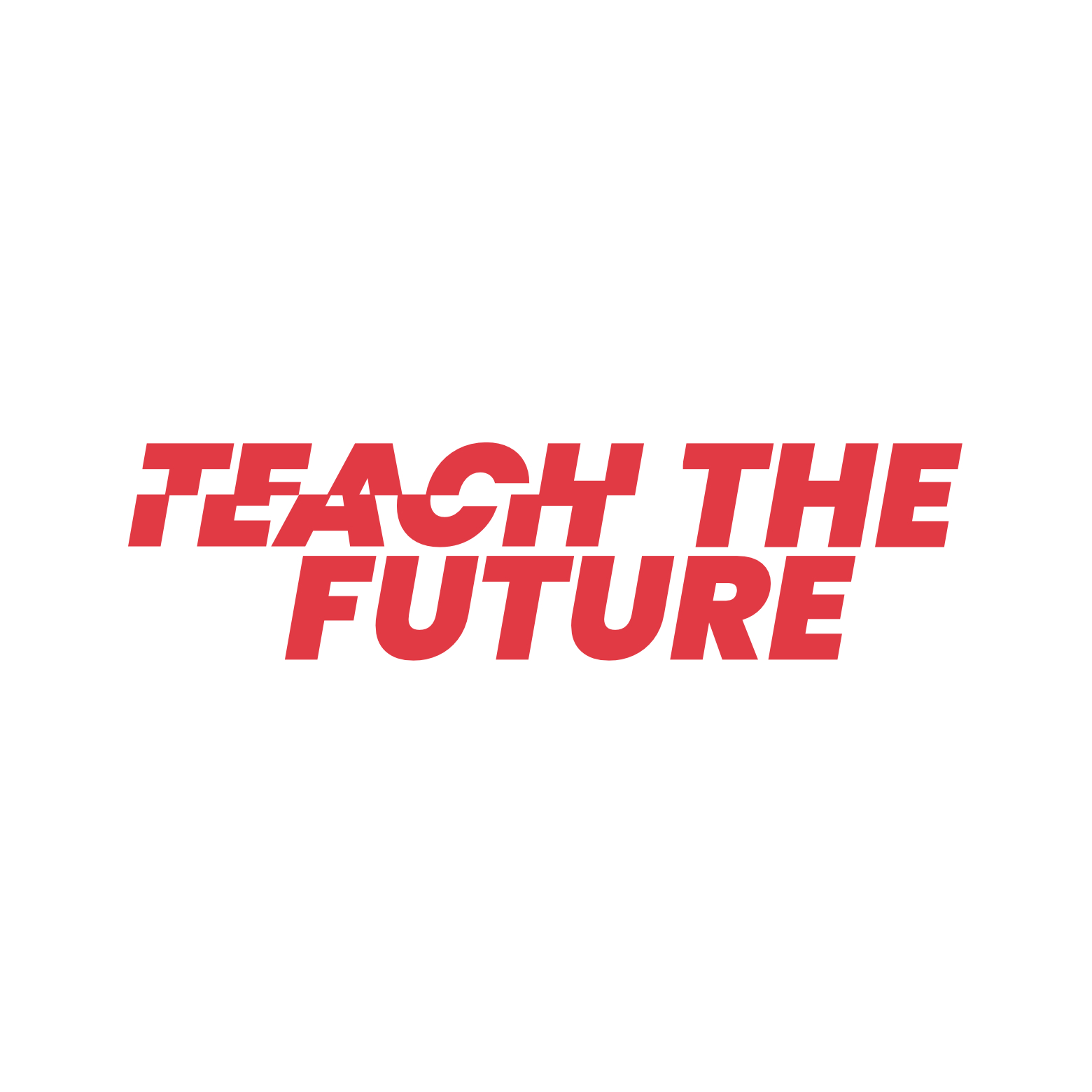
- Named after: The 2nd UKSCN Demand
- Formation: 12 October 2019
- Type: Campaign
- Purpose: Climate education and green school estate
- Region served: UK - active all nations
- Parent organization: UK Student Climate Network, Students Organising for Sustainability UK, Fridays for Future Scotland, the National Union of Students Scotland, UKSCN Wales
- Subsidiaries: Teach the Future England; Teach the Future Scotland; Teach the Future Wales; Teach the Future NI
- Website: https://www.teachthefuture.uk

Teach the Future is a youth-led campaign pushing for broad climate education in the UK, with branches in Scotland, Northern Ireland, England and Wales. Founded by a volunteer base of students in High School and Further Education.

The campaign focuses on implementing Climate and Nature Education across Curriculums in the UK. equipping generations to come with the skills and knowledge needed for the green jobs of the futures.

== History ==
=== 2019: Founding ===
The idea for Teach the Future was formulated at the Friends of the Earth Youth Gathering at the Keele University in the summer of 2019, with young climate campaigners frustrated at their lack of school education on climate. “The Teach the Future” slogan evolved from the demands of the Student Climate Network- which worked regularly with Teach the Future through the campaigns forming.

The campaign was unveiled on 12 October 2019 at the National Education Union's Climate Emergency Conference, in front of a room full of educational specialists and campaigners. Two days after the campaign unveiling, Teach the Future began a petition for broader climate education across the country which has gathered more than 27,000 signatures.

=== 2020: Parliamentary reception and new campaigns ===
Between March and April 2020 the campaign suspended its activities in light of the COVID lockdown.

After this period, Teach the Future moved to a more online-focused organising system which has been largely retained.

In May 2020, six new student staff members were appointed to Coordinate Teach the Future alongside existing volunteers.

In June Teach the Future began their campaign for a green recovery for education from Covid.

Tech the Future launched in June 2020 with an event outside the Scottish parliament. The group held meetings with Deputy First Minister John Swinney and MSPs from across the parliament.

=== 2021: Drafting a climate education bill ===
As a result of Teach the Future's campaigning ahead of the 2021 Scottish Parliament elections, Climate education was mentioned in the manifestos of the Scottish Labour Party, Scottish Liberal Democrats and SNP, while the Scottish Greens specifically referenced the campaign in their manifesto.

In March 2021 Teach the Future drafted amendments to the new Welsh curriculum which were tabled by MS Llyr Grufdydd and gained support from Plaid Cymru and the Welsh Conservatives, before being defeated 20-31 in a debate.

In August 2021 Teach the Future held a protest outside the Department for Education, calling for improved climate education.

In November 2021- Teach the Future’s student-written climate education bill was tabled by Nadia Whittome in the UK Parliament. The parliament voted for the bill to be given a future 2nd reading.

=== 2022: Focus on teaching reform ===
In September, Teach the Future launched their “Curriculum for a changing climate” proposals with recommendations for the integration of climate teaching in all subjects across primary, KS3 and GCSE students in England based on academic research.

=== 2023: Parliamentary Receptions ===
In March 2023 Teach the Future held a Scottish parliamentary reception, to promote its Scottish asks. The reception included speeches from education secretary Shirley Anne Sommerville, Ross Greer MSP, and NUS Scotland president Ellie Gomersall.

In June 2023 Teach the Future held a Welsh parliamentary reception, with the support of Senedd Members.

In October 2023, Teach the Future’s Climate and Education Bill was included in the Labour's draft policy programme for the General Election.

=== 2024: General Election Climate Cards ===
For the upcoming general election Teach the Future has launched the campaign, “Is climate on their cards.” A project where young people will ask politicians about their climate commitments and grade them on their answers.

== Asks ==
Teach the Future had developed campaign asks for each of the four UK Nation's differing education systems.
