= Chris I. Westbrook =

Chris I. Westbrook from the Institut d'Optique Graduate School, was awarded the status of Fellow in the American Physical Society, after they were nominated by their Division of Atomic, Molecular & Optical Physics in 2008, for "outstanding contributions to the development of methods to laser cool atoms below the Dopler limit, for the creation of a Bose-Einstein condensate of metastable helium atoms, and for pioneering experiments in quantum optics for measuring of atom-atom pair correlations in ultracold gases."

== See also ==
- List of fellows of the American Physical Society (1998–2010)
