= List of Doraemon (1979 TV series) episodes (1979–1986) =

This article lists television episodes and specials featuring the Japanese anime character Doraemon. There have been over 2,000 such episodes since the first full Doraemon episode was broadcast in April 1979.

== Series overview ==
Year	Episodes	Originally released	
Year	Episodes	First released	Last released
1979	235	April 2, 1979	December 31, 1979
1980	256	January 1, 1980	December 30, 1980
1981	152	January 1, 1981	December 25, 1981
1982	49	January 1, 1982	December 24, 1982
1983	52	January 1, 1983	December 30, 1983
1984	51	January 1, 1984	December 28, 1984
1985	52	January 1, 1985	December 27, 1985
1986	50	January 3, 1986	December 26, 1986
1987	60	January 2, 1987	December 25, 1987
1988	49	January 8, 1988	December 23, 1988
1989	54	January 6, 1989	December 29, 1989
1990	50	January 5, 1990	December 28, 1990
1991	51	January 4, 1991	December 27, 1991
1992	55	January 10, 1992	December 25, 1992
1993	70	January 8, 1993	December 24, 1993
1994	51	January 7, 1994	December 23, 1994
1995	48	January 6, 1995	December 22, 1995
1996	48	January 5, 1996	December 21, 1996
1997	51	January 10, 1997	December 23, 1997
1998	44	January 9, 1998	December 18, 1998
1999	45	January 8, 1999	December 31, 1999
2000	40	January 14, 2000	December 15, 2000
2001	41	January 12, 2001	December 14, 2001
2002	45	January 11, 2002	December 31, 2002
2003	45	January 17, 2003	December 12, 2003
2004	38	January 9, 2004	December 18, 2004
2005	10	January 7, 2005	March 18, 2005

== 1979 ==
No.	Title	Original release date
0	"The Fishing Pond in My Study Room"; Transliteration: "Benkyō Heya no Tsuribori" (Japanese: 勉強部屋のつりぼり)	October 3, 1978
Nobita and Doraemon along with Shizuka are walking on a road when Gian called out " Hey! Nobita and Doraemon!!", Nobita and Shizuka with Doraemon run to Gian and Suneo who brag about how many fish they caught. When they leave, Doraemon and Nobita want to go fishing too.
1	"The City of Dreams, Nobita Land"; Transliteration: "Yune no Machi Nobitarando" (Japanese: ゆめの町ノビタランド)	April 2, 1979
The episode starts with Nobita getting bored. Then Suneo invites them to play Dodgeball, but when they get to the place they usually play gets turned into a place to put materials. Then Doraemon takes out a camera which can make miniature versions of buildings. They successfully make Nobita Land and invited their friends to play, but it gets destroyed by Nobita's Mother in the end. The episode ends with all the scrap metal landing on Doraemon.
2	"The Transformation Biscuits"; Transliteration: "Henshin Bisuketto" (Japanese: 変身ビスケット)	April 3, 1979
The episode starts with Nobita's mother asking Nobita to buy desserts to treat their visitor. He goes upstairs and finds a box of Transformation Biscuits. He eats a cat shaped one and then takes the box to the visitor, who eats four of the biscuits. Then his mother reminds him to buy the desserts. He then goes to buy desserts and to his shock, turns into a cat for five minutes. Later, Nobita and Doraemon then try to stop his mother from seeing the transformation happening on the visitor. The episode ends with Nobita's father fainting upon seeing that Nobita's mother had turned into a rabbit after eating a biscuit.
3	"Memorization Bread for Testing"; Transliteration: "Tesuto ni Ankipan" (Japanese: テストにアンキパン)	April 4, 1979
The episode starts with Nobita running into Doraemon and asking him for a tool to help him study for his examinations that takes place tomorrow. Doraemon gives him some Memory Bread which Nobita eats and understands the work. Later, he relaxed and ate desserts until he became full, but Doraemon forces him to eat extra memory bread. The episode ends with Nobita vomiting and re-eating memory bread from the start the very next day. Later remade as "Copying Toast" in 1992.
4	"N-S Badges"; Transliteration: "N・S Wappen" (Japanese: N・Sワッペン)	April 5, 1979
The episode starts with Gian playing with two magnets. Nobita then says that he should know about magnetic properties in kindergarten. Gian then gets really angry and chases after Nobita. Nobita runs home and asks Doraemon for help, and he gives Nobita some N and S emblems after successfully testing them on Nobita's parents. Then he puts a S emblem on Nobita and the other S emblem on Gian. Nobita then escapes from Gian, but he instead makes a mistake and ends up being attracted to Gian. The episode ends with Doraemon ignoring Nobita when he pleads for help.
5	"Wrestling Killer"; Transliteration: "Korobashiya" (Japanese: ころばし屋)	April 6, 1979
The episode starts with Nobita and Gian being almost late for school and running into each other. An angry Gian then knocks Nobita down, causing him to be late. Doraemon tries to aid Nobita with a Wrestling Killer tool. At first, Nobita mistakes it for a gun, but later understand how it works and uses it to knock Gian down. Later Suneo tricks him and he sets the tool to knock Suneo down, but accidentally caused it to turn against him. He then wastes ¥100 trying to stop the tool. The episode ends with Nobita falling down the stairs.
6	"Nobita's Bride"; Transliteration: "Nobita no Oyome-san" (Japanese: のび太のおよめさん)	April 7, 1979
The episode starts with Nobita and Doraemon celebrating Nobita's birthday. Then they go to the future and they try to find Nobita's bride, who turns out to be Shizuka. Then they almost get beaten up by Nobita's son in the future due to a mix-up, for Nobita's son looked just like him. The two escaped with injury and find Shizuka in Nobita's house presenting him with a present. The episode ends with Shizuka and Nobita walking away.
7	"Doraemon's Prediction"; Transliteration: "Doraemon no Dai Yagen" (Japanese: ドラえもんの大予言)	April 9, 1979
The episode starts with Nobita getting home and wanting to go to Shizuka's house to play, but is stopped by Doraemon. He then open a book and tells Nobita that if he goes out, he will get in hospital because he will be hit by a truck. After persuasion by Shizuka, Doraemon goes outside with Nobita and uses a "future mirror" to see what will happen to them in 10 seconds time. Eventually, after near-accidents, they make it there but when he opens the door he gets hit by a toy truck on the head. The episode ends with Nobita laughing with Doraemon. First use of flying hats.
8	"Dinosaur Hunting"; Transliteration: "Kyōryū Hantā" (Japanese: 恐竜ハンター)	April 10, 1979
Doraemon and Nobita's first time travel. They get into a drawer which leads to them travelling on a time machine and end up ten billion years in the past. After shrinking one dinosaur, Doraemon cannot find his gun but they manage to escape the second one, with Nobita leaving his glasses behind, which are found in the present time, to the amazement of scientists.
9	"The Devil Passport"; Transliteration: "Akuma no Pasupōto" (Japanese: 悪魔のパスポート)	April 11, 1979
The episode starts with Nobita getting yelled at by his mom. Running to Doraemon for help, Nobita takes out a dangerous gadget that allows him to do whatever he wants with no consequence.
10	"Lucky Gun"; Transliteration: "Rakkī Gan" (Japanese: ラッキーガン)	April 12, 1979
Nobita has some bad luck so Doraemon gives him a gun which shoots red bullets (actually bursts of light) for good luck and black bullets for bad luck, but no way of deciding which you get. Cowardly Nobita has 3 others try it first and they all get good luck. A little boy takes the gun and shoots Nobita with a black bullet and he gets all bad luck.
11	"The Cursing Camera"; Transliteration: "Noroi no Kamera" (Japanese: のろいのカメラ)	April 13, 1979
Nobita accidentally makes voodoo dolls of Doraemon and his parents using the camera and they fall into the hands of two rough girls.
12	"The Wolf Family"; Transliteration: "Ōkami Ikka" (Japanese: オオカミ一家)	April 14, 1979
Nobita makes a bet to his friends that he will catch the last wild wolf in Japan. Doraemon overhears and backs him up. Along the way, Nobita transforms into a wolf with one of Doraemon's gadget and learns about their dire situation.
13	"Let's Build a Subway"; Transliteration: "Chikatetsu o Tsukucchae" (Japanese: 地下鉄をつくっちゃえ)	April 16, 1979
Nobita and Doraemon use a digging machine to build their own subway as a birthday present for Nobita's father so he doesn't have to take the very crowded public subway to work.
14	"Masked Self, Hero of Justice"; Transliteration: "Seigi no Mikata・Serufu Kamen" (Japanese: 正義の味方・セルフ仮面)	April 17, 1979
This episode begins with Nobita wanting someone to save him from all of his troubles. The show continues with the sudden appearance of a masked hero that turns out to be Nobita from the future time traveling to help himself in tough situations.
15	"I Got 100%, For Once in My Life..."; Transliteration: "Isshō ni Ichido wa Hyaku-ten o" (Japanese: 一生に一度は百点を)	April 18, 1979
Doraemon lends Nobita a computer pencil which writes all the answers to his homework. Gian steals it and uses it in an exam to get 100% but his father thinks he is cheating and beats him. Suneo and Gian now Nobita's friends. Remade in 1992 as "Computer Pencil".
16	"Swapping Moms"; Transliteration: "Mama o Torikaekko" (Japanese: ママをとりかえっこ)	April 19, 1979
Nobita, Shizuka and Suneo are all fed up with their mothers so Doraemon arranges it for them to swap parents and they find that mums are not so bad after all.
17	"The Time Cloth"; Transliteration: "Taimu Furoshiki" (Japanese: タイムふろしき)	April 20, 1979
The episode begins with Nobita and Doraemon watching TV. The TV is old, but Nobita's mom is able to keep it working with a pound. Doraemon pulls out a cloth that can reverse or progress time depending on which side it is on.
18	"Treasure of Chinkara Peak"; Transliteration: "Chinkara Tōge no Takaramono" (Japanese: 珍加羅峠の宝物)	April 21, 1979
Nobita and Doraemon hear about treasures on the mountain behind the school. They go searching for gold and valuables, but turns out to be a salesman wanting to purchase a house.
19	"Air Combat"; Transliteration: "Dai Kūchū-sen" (Japanese: 大空中戦)	April 23, 1979
Doraemon gives the gang model planes which shrink them down so they can fly inside them. Gian gets the only jet plane and shoots the others down, then afterwards rests on top of the Tokyo Tower, only to have his model plane fall off, stranding him there. This episode was remade as Our Big Air Battle in the 2005 series.
20	"The No Room Door"; Transliteration: "Nai Heya Doa" (Japanese: ナイヘヤドア)	April 24, 1979
Nobita wants his independence from his family so Doraemon gives him a door which when placed against a wall, creates a room behind it which can be lived in. Nobita finds he is not ready to leave home yet.
21	"Run! Bamboo Horse"; Transliteration: "Hashire! Umatake" (Japanese: 走れ！ウマタケ)	April 25, 1979
The horses are stilts. Cry baby Nobita has boasted that he will enter a stilt race tomorrow but he does not know how to walk on stilts so Doraemon goes to the 22nd Century to get him a cross between a stilt and a horse. Gian steals it so Doraemon becomes a tough teacher as he trains Nobita to walk on stilts. The mechanical stilt horse runs amok in Gian's house.
22	"Ah, Love, Love, Love!"; Transliteration: "Aa, Suki, Suki, Suki" (Japanese: ああ、好き、好き、好き)	April 26, 1979
A new girl nearby ignores Nobita. Doraemon gives him a cupid's bow whose arrows will cause anyone he shoots to love him. The first arrow hits a dog, then an ugly girl. An ugly man accidentally shoots Doraemon. Finally an arrow hits the girl and she falls for Nobita but he ends up being chased by the ugly girl who still has a love arrow in her.
23	"Wild Animal-Taming Gloves"; Transliteration: "Mōjūnarashi Tebukuro" (Japanese: 猛獣ならし手袋)	April 27, 1979
Gian wants to beat up Nobita so Doraemon gives him a glove which makes Gian behave like a friendly dog.
24	"Ancestors, Come On"; Transliteration: "Gosenzo-sama Ganbare" (Japanese: ご先祖様がんばれ)	April 28, 1979
Suneo boasts about his Samurai ancestor so Doraemon and Nobita go back in time to see Nobita's hunter ancestor, and get caught up in a small war. Doraemon gets an arrow through his head but just pulls it out. Remade in 2001 as "Nobita's Ancestors".
25	"Vehicle Accessories"; Transliteration: "Norimono Akusesarī" (Japanese: のりものアクセサリー)	April 30, 1979
Nobita wants to fight monsters using Doraemon's toys which give him the power of a plane, a tank and a submarine but finds he gets only petty jobs.
26	"Top Secret Spy Operation"; Transliteration: "(Hi) Supai Dai Sakusen" (Japanese: (秘)スパイ大作戦)	May 1, 1979
The episode starts with Nobita breaking his teacher's vase while he was cleaning the classroom with Suneo. Suneo agreed to help Nobita cover up his crime, on the condition that he must do whatever Suneo wants. Fearing his teacher, Nobita reluctantly agreed. Along the way, Suneo and his friends taunt Nobita about the vase. Doraemon furiously takes out a tool that spies on Suneo's house, and Nobita found out that Suneo had a habit of bedwetting. Suneo's plan backfired when Nobita taunted him with his secret bedwetting habit. In the end, Suneo's friends wanted to taunt Nobita by making him do a headstand and bark like a dog, but Suneo, fearing that Nobita may uncover his secret, did the headstand.
27	"I'll Become a Singer By Eating Candy"; Transliteration: "Kyandē Namete Kashu ni Narou" (Japanese: キャンデーなめて歌手になろう)	May 2, 1979
Doraemon and Nobita are invited to another of Gian's singing events. This time, Doraemon gives Gian candy that lets him sing like a real singer by storing the voice in the candy. Gian believing it to be his own voice, enters a televised youth singing contest. The problem however is the candy only lasts 30 seconds before wearing off.
28	"Oh, Lovely Mii-chan!"; Transliteration: "Sutekina Mii-chan" (Japanese: すてきなミイちゃん)	May 3, 1979
Doraemon falls madly in love with a toy cat. The owner lets him have it after he rescues it from a dog and he uses 22nd century technology to make it as real as he is, only to find out that it too is a male cat.
29	"The Toy Soldiers"; Transliteration: "Omocha no Heitai" (Japanese: おもちゃの兵隊)	May 4, 1979
Gian wants to beat up Nobita so as Doraemon is busy with a puzzle, he sends out five toy soldiers who attack anyone who is even slightly angry with Nobita, including his mother.
30	"The Fish Flag Float"; Transliteration: "Koi no Bori" (Japanese: こいのぼり)	May 5, 1979
A poor boy (Tzo) has no father so cannot afford fish flags so Doraemon uses a cloud machine and has some fish flags produce young who quickly grow up into fish flags for Tzo.
31	"Antique Competition"; Transliteration: "Kodōgukyō Hashi" (Japanese: 古どうぐきょう走)	May 7, 1979
Nobita is jealous of Suneo's collection of antiques so has Doraemon use a time cell phone to swap modern things with old things held in a 22nd Century antiques shop. Nobita misuses it and the family find everything of theirs including the house coming from ever earlier time periods. Doraemon tries to put things right but Nobita's family end up with a 22nd Century house whose automation is full of trouble. Nobita appears completely naked as his clothes vanish. This episode is remade in 1986 as "The Time Receiver."
32	"The Bow-Bow Grasshopper"; Transliteration: "Peka-peka Batta" (Japanese: ペコペコバッタ)	May 8, 1979
When Nobita gets blamed for getting hit by Gian's ball, Doraemon pulls out an apology gadget called "The Bow-Bow Grasshopper" but the gadgets wreak havoc on the town after Doraemon trips and accidentally released the gadgets. Remade in 2005 as "The Bowing Grasshoppers"
33	"Paper Crafts Sure Are Fun"; Transliteration: "Kami Kōsaku wa Tanoshīna" (Japanese: 紙工作は楽しいな)	May 9, 1979
Doraemon gives Nobita a giant paper cut-out book which makes things that really work like a flying saucer, and a dinosaur which wants to eat them.
34	"A Girl Like White Lilies"; Transliteration: "Shiroyuri no Yōna On'nanoko" (Japanese: 白ゆりのような女の子)	May 10, 1979
Nobita's father tells him that he had received chocolate from a girl when he was a child, so Nobita and Doraemon go to the past to find out who the girl was. Nobita falls into a pond and gets wet, and Doraemon gives him a piece of cloth to wear which makes him look like a girl. They spot Nobita's father coming to the edge of the pond, and Doraemon gives Nobita chocolate which he gives to his father.
35	"Opposite Arrow"; Transliteration: "Kobe Abe" (Japanese: コベアべ)	May 11, 1979
Doraemon produces a magic flute which when used makes people do the opposite of what they intended. Nobita uses it on a thief.
36	"Time Camera"; Transliteration: "Okure Kamera" (Japanese: おくれカメラ)	May 12, 1979
Mr. Nobi, Nobita's father has lost his wallet so using a camera which can photograph past events, Nobita and Doraemon track it down.
37	"Nobita's Proposal Strategy"; Transliteration: "Puropōzu Sakusen" (Japanese: プロポーズ作戦)	May 14, 1979
The episode begins with Nobita's mother preparing a fine meal in celebration of the twelfth anniversary of Nobita's father and hers wedding. At dinner, Nobita's mother and father have conflicting memories on who proposed first. They fight, and Doraemon takes Nobita back in time to find out just what happened. On the day of the proposal, they see Nobita's future father running late. To teach him a lesson, Nobita's future mother pretends to walk off, but decides to go back to him once it appears he has suffered long enough. It seems, however, that she has very poor eyesight and she picked another man who happens to be similarly built and dressed. Nobita's father stalks off. Once Nobita's mother puts on her eyeglasses and realizes she has the wrong man, she goes after him, but sees him embracing his sister and misinterprets this to be his quick recovery from their break-up. To rectify the situation, Doraemon uses a robot that transforms into each of their parents and tells the other the thing they remembered at dinner. They marry, but Nobita realizes they didn't solve the problem of who proposed first. Once returned to his own time, Nobita expects his parents to have divorced, but surprisingly, they have decided who proposed first doesn't matter and made up on their own. This episode is remade as "The Proposal from 13 years ago" in 2005 in the same series, then a second time in the 2005 series.
38	"Reservation Machine"; Transliteration: "Rizābu Mashin" (Japanese: リザーブマシン)	May 15, 1979
Doraemon helps Nobita and his father see a new film using a machine which can reserve anything so no one else can use that thing first. Nobita inadvertently traps 3 of his friends at home all afternoon and Gian promises revenge.
39	"Raccoon Maker"; Transliteration: "Tanu-ki" (Japanese: タヌ機)	May 16, 1979
After Suneo upsets Nobita by saying he looks like a cartoon raccoon, Doraemon gives Nobita glasses which makes Suneo see the illusions that he wants him to see, and so upsets Shizuka and Gian.
40	"○○ Does ×× and △△"; Transliteration: "○○ ga XX to △△ suru" (Japanese: ○○がXXと△△する)	May 17, 1979
Shizuka agrees to study with Nobita but when Gian asks her, she goes with him instead. Cry baby Nobita moans to Doraemon who gives him a pad where anything he writes in it comes true.
41	"The Girl With the Red Shoes"; Transliteration: "Akai Kutsu no On'nanoko" (Japanese: 赤いくつの女の子)	May 18, 1979
Nobita is forced to clean the shed with his mom and get rid of some old things he no longer needs. A red shoe appears and turns out to be the shoe of a girl that used to be in his neighborhood, but moved to America. Nobita and her used to be next door neighbors and have play dates all afternoon. Little Suneo and Gian made fun of little Nobita and made him steal one of her shoe the day prior to her family moving. Nobita remembering the events asked Doraemon to go back to the past with him to correct his wrongs. Nobita returns her shoe, apologizes, and makes a promise to find her in America when they grow up. In return she gives Nobita all of the pots and pans they used while playing house. Remade in 1987 as "Memories of the Red Shoe."
42	"Put on Some Flattery Lipstick"; Transliteration: "Oseji Kuchibeni" (Japanese: おせじ口べに)	May 19, 1979
Nobita's too honest comments upsets his parents so Doraemon gives him a lipstick which makes him charm everybody. His mother finds a discarded lipstick which makes wearers insult everybody and Nobita comes home to find her and his father shouting insults at each other.
43	"Memories of Grandma (part 1)"; Transliteration: "Obā-chan no Omoide (Mae)" (Japanese: おばあちゃんのおもいで（前）)	May 21, 1979
Looking through some old photos, Nobita is very upset as he misses his (dead) grandmother who made a lot of fuss over him. Against his will Doraemon takes them back 8 years. Nobita upsets his mother who does not recognize him as her 3-year-old son. This episode is later remade in 1986 as "I Love Grandma."
44	"Memories of Grandma (part 2)"; Transliteration: "Obāchan no Omoide (Ato)" (Japanese: おばあちゃんのおもいで（後）)	May 22, 1979
Nobita gets to meet his grandmother and finds he was a bit of a bratty kid. Again upsetting his then mother and self, his grandmother protects him again and he shows her what he looks like in his school uniform before leaving.
45	"I'll Be My Own Teacher"; Transliteration: "Boku o Boku no Sensei ni" (Japanese: ぼくをぼくの先生に)	May 23, 1979
Nobita's parents decide to get him a tutor as his grades are bad so Nobita decides to use himself 3 years in the future to answer his school questions now. But his future self is dumb because Nobita did not study and that Nobita too has a future self who turns up and complains that he is dumb too because Nobita 3 years in the future did not study either. The three of them go to the kindergarten Nobita, saying that if they want to improve their grades, they have to start from the beginning. However, none of them has the heart to tell the kindergarten Nobita to study, so they return to the present time.
46	"The Strange Encounter Machine"; Transliteration: "Michito no Sōgū-ki" (Japanese: 未知とのそうぐう機)	May 24, 1979
Despite being told not to, Nobita plays with Doraemon's machine, finding it calls a UFO from far away. The alien is upset, being called for no good reason but they manage to placate it with beer. Nobita's mother upsets it and it wants to invade the Earth but is again placated by Nobita's marble collection.
47	"Nobita in the Mirror"; Transliteration: "Kagami no Naka no Nobita" (Japanese: かがみの中ののび太)	May 25, 1979
Nobita wants many toys but can't afford them. Using Doraemon's magic mirror, what he holds up to it is copied, so he borrows toys and copies them. But Nobita also gets copied himself producing a mischievous Nobita.
48	"The Dimensional Copy"; Transliteration: "Rittai Kopī" (Japanese: 立体コピー)	May 26, 1979
Nobita cannot go out so Doraemon produces some magic paper that makes paper copies of anything including Nobita. However, as soon as they leave, a wind blows away the paper figure of Nobita which then has a number of adventures. Remade as The Nobita that Nobita Never Knew in the 2005 series.
49	"Let's Go See the Ocean in a Submarine"; Transliteration: "Sen-mizu-kan de Umi e Ikou" (Japanese: せん水艦で海へ行こう)	May 28, 1979
The episode starts off with Suneo saying that he can take some people with him in his Dad's motorboat, Nobita wants to go but Suneo says that there will only be four seats, his Dad, himself, Shizuka and Gian. Nobita wanting to go begs Doraemon to give him a gadget to win over Shizuka and Gian, Doraemon pulls out a "Mini Submarine" and Doraemon tries to go to the sea but Doraemon keeps typing in the wrong coordinates and they teleport to all sorts of places, like the toilet.
50	"The Friendship Capsule"; Transliteration: "Yūjō Kapuseru" (Japanese: 友情カプセル)	May 29, 1979
Suneo tries to lure Doraemon from Nobita but he won't go so he gives Suneo a capsule which makes anyone your friend as a consolation. Cunning Suneo uses it to make Doraemon become his friend.
51	"Submission Ring"; Transliteration: "Gokū Ringu" (Japanese: ごくうリング)	May 30, 1979
Nobita is too lazy to do his homework without pressure so Doraemon gives him a headband which is painful if anyone says "close", which Doraemon uses to make Nobita do what he should do.
52	"The Apartment Tree"; Transliteration: "Apāto no Ki" (Japanese: アパートの木)	May 31, 1979
Nobita wants his own apartment so Doraemon gives him a tree which grows rooms underground and the gang move in. Remade in 1989 as "Apartment Pretend."
53	"Real Shooting"; Transliteration: "Jitsubutsu Shateki" (Japanese: 実物射的)	June 1, 1979
Nobita tries to get Doraemon's favourite sweet, but Doraemon uses a gadget to prevent him from doing so and Doraemon lets him use it but to harm Gian and his friends but unsuccessful. In the end, Gian and his friends use the gadget against Nobita which hit him.
54	"Find the Culprit with the Time Machine"; Transliteration: "Taimu Mashin de Hannin o" (Japanese: タイムマシンで犯人を)	June 2, 1979
Nobita is wrongly blamed for breaking a school window. A time machine helps him find out what really happened.
55	"The King of Sharpshooting Contest"; Transliteration: "Kenjū-ō Kontesuto" (Japanese: けん銃王コンテスト)	June 4, 1979
Doraemon gives Nobita an ointment which when rubbed on the fingers, fires a jet of air powerful enough to knock someone over. Remade as "Air Pistol" in 2001.
56	"Fining Piggy Bank"; Transliteration: "Bakkinbako" (Japanese: ばっ金箱)	June 5, 1979
Gian busts another football so all the gang say they have no money for another one. Doraemon produces a small robot which takes 100 yen from anyone who does something bad, to get money for a new ball. Bully Gian quickly falls foul of it.
57	"The Wack in the Future"; Transliteration: "Hausu Robotto" (Japanese: ハウスロボット)	June 6, 1979
Nobita tries to get the better of bully Gian using Doraemon's things from the future, but Gian has things from the future too and gets the better of him.
58	"Nobita's Castaway Story"; Transliteration: "Nobita Hyōryū-ki" (Japanese: のび太漂流記)	June 7, 1979
Nobita wants to live on an island like Robinson Crusoe, but is such a helpless crybaby that hidden Doraemon has to keep helping him.
59	"Air Block Maker"; Transliteration: "Kūki Burokku Seizō-ki" (Japanese: 空気ブロックせいぞう機)	June 8, 1979
Doraemon gives Nobita a machine which produces blocks of solid air which stay in position. Unfortunately he forgets to tell Nobita that they vanish after a time, leaving him hanging high up in the air.
60	"The Continuation Spray"; Transliteration: "Tsuzuki Supurē" (Japanese: つづきスプレー)	June 9, 1979
Doraemon gives Nobita a spray that changes a picture to what would happen next in the picture, like a ship moving. Nobita ruins a man's art collection trying it out.
61	"Lost Item Retrieval Machine"; Transliteration: "Nakushimono Toriyose-ki" (Japanese: なくし物とりよせ機)	June 11, 1979
Nobita tells Doraemon that he lost his grandmother's platinum ring. Doraemon helps him using a Lost Item Retrieval Machine.
62	"First Antenna"; Transliteration: "Arakajime Antena" (Japanese: あらかじめアンテナ)	June 12, 1979
Doraemon and Nobita use a TV antenna, which allows the wearer to be prepared for any event that will happen.
63	"The Voice Thickener"; Transliteration: "Koe no Katamari" (Japanese: 声のかたまり)	June 13, 1979
Gian is giving Nobita trouble so Doraemon gives him a medicine which makes his words into solid letters which can be used as weapons.
64	"The Wishing Star"; Transliteration: "Negai Hoshi" (Japanese: ねがい星)	June 14, 1979
Doraemon throws out some of his useless inventions, including the Star of Hope. Gian and Suneo find it, not realising that the wishes it grants are always wrong. Remade in 1992 as "Ask the Stars."
65	"The Big R/C Naval Battle"; Transliteration: "Rajikon Dai Kaisen" (Japanese: ラジコン大海戦)	June 15, 1979
Doraemon helps Nobita win an R/C battle in the waters.
66	"XYZ-Ray Camera"; Transliteration: "XYZ-sen Kamera" (Japanese: XYZ線カメラ)	June 16, 1979
A special camera can see through things including clothing. Not knowing this, Shizuka wants Nobita to take a picture of her. Some nudity occurs.
67	"Let's Be Lightning"; Transliteration: "Kaminari ni Nareyō" (Japanese: カミナリになれよう)	June 18, 1979
Doraemon produces a small thunder cloud to cure Nobita of his fear of thunder. With this done, Nobita uses it to shock people.
68	"A Visitor from the Country of the Future"; Transliteration: "Mirai Sekai no Jaihin" (Japanese: 未来世界の怪人)	June 19, 1979
Nobita tries to get the better of bully Gian using Doraemon's things from the future, but Gian has things from the future too and gets the better of him.
69	"The Weather Box"; Transliteration: "Otenki Bokkusu" (Japanese: お天気ボックス)	June 20, 1979
After Suneo and Nobita argue about the weather of the next day, Doraemon gives him a gadget that controls the weather.
70	"Home Satellite"; Transliteration: "Jikayō Eisei" (Japanese: 自家用衛星)	June 21, 1979
After Nobita's friends laugh at him, he asks Doraemon for Home Satellite gadget to take revenge on them.
71	"The Life Do-Over Machine"; Transliteration: "Jinsei Yarinaoshi-ki" (Japanese: 人生やりなおし機)	June 22, 1979
Doraemon gives Nobita the Do-Over Machine which lets the user redo any age. This episode was later remade in 1994 as "Redo Life Machine," then as "The Life Do-Over Machine" in the 2005 series.
72	"The Super King"; Transliteration: "Sūpādan" (Japanese: スーパーダン)	June 23, 1979
73	"Let's Set Up the Customer's Face"; Transliteration: "Okyaku no Kao o Kumitateyou" (Japanese: お客の顔を組み立てよう)	June 25, 1979
Nobita changes his face using a machine, but later finds out that he has a similar face to a wanted criminal.
74	"That Lie is True"; Transliteration: "Sono Uso Honto" (Japanese: ソノウソホント)	June 26, 1979
Using a Lying Beak, Nobita makes the lies about his father true.
75	"I Love You, Roboko"; Transliteration: "Roboko ga Itoshi teru" (Japanese: ロボ子が愛してる)	June 27, 1979
Nobita is doing poorly with girls so Doraemon makes him a girl to love him but the powerful machine gets jealous of Shizuka and angry when Nobita's mother shouts at him.
76	"Let's Play in the Clouds"; Transliteration: "Kumo Zaiku de Asobou" (Japanese: 雲ざいくで遊ぼう)	June 28, 1979
Nobita is working on his tan when a cloud covers the sun. Doraemon gives him a machine which controls clouds and he uses it to scare Shizuka and a friend as well as Gian. Then it overheats.
77	"The Truth Stickers"; Transliteration: "Uraomo Tekkusu" (Japanese: ウラオモテックス)	June 29, 1979
Suneo butters up everybody, to Nobita's annoyance so Doraemon gives him a square of sellotape which when put on Suneo's back reveals his true bad personality to everyone.
78	"The Fake Alien"; Transliteration: "Nise Uchūjin" (Japanese: ニセ宇宙人)	June 30, 1979
Gian and Suneo trick Nobita with a fake UFO, so Doraemon comes up with a real one and a remote controlled alien, which makes the pair regret their joke.
79	"The Illustrated Encyclopedia of Real Things"; Transliteration: "Honmo no Zukan" (Japanese: ほんもの図鑑)	July 2, 1979
Doraemon gives Nobita an illustrated encyclopedia from the future. When he turns to the page of the thing he wants to look up, he hits the spine of the book, then the real thing will come flying out.
80	"Peck Rope"; Transliteration: "Menkui Kamera" (Japanese: めんくいカメラ)	July 3, 1979
A rope that can bring anything falls into Suneo's hands and he uses it to take stuff from the other kids, then Nobita gets the blame but a good deed reveals the true villain.
81	"The Day When I Was Born"; Transliteration: "Boku no Umaretahi" (Japanese: ぼくの生まれた日)	July 4, 1979
The episode begins with Nobita getting yelled at by his mom and dad. Their expectations and reality causes Nobita to believe that he was picked up or adopted. Nobita and Doraemon go back to the past to the day that Nobita was born. Nobita realises the dreams and aspirations that his parents hold for him and it causes him to study.
82	"Torment Machine"; Transliteration: "Sainan Kunren-ki" (Japanese: さいなんくんれん機)	July 5, 1979
The episode starts when Nobita finishes his homework and decides to sleep indoors, then he is blown away by a huge gust of wind. Then Doraemon reveals that he used a gadget to create holograms of dangerous weathers and Nobita uses it to a man who arrived at his front door and took over his room.
83	"The Pool in the Clouds"; Transliteration: "Kumo no Naka no Pūru" (Japanese: 雲の中のプール)	July 6, 1979
The episode starts off with Suneo and Gian asking Nobita if he wants to go to the pool. Nobita runs away and is questioned by Doraemon. Nobita reveals that he can't swim and that they were just mocking him. Doraemon seeing that Nobita is embarrassed to go to the community pool decided to create a pool for Nobita in the sky. Along the way, Suneo, Gian, and Shizuka tag along.
84	"Mancutting Machine"; Transliteration: "Ningen Setsudan-ki" (Japanese: 人間切断機)	July 7, 1979
85	"Dried Fish"; Transliteration: "Yūrei no Himono" (Japanese: ゆうれいの干物)	July 9, 1979
The episode starts when Nobita and Shizuka broke into a home of a man and uses Doraemon's gadget to unleash a ghost to get him out of there and it's up to Doraemon to stop that from happening.
86	"Taking an Arrow to School"; Transliteration: "Yumiya de Gakkō e" (Japanese: 弓やで学校へ)	July 10, 1979
With a Moving Arrow and Bow, Doraemon helps Nobita place targets at various locations so going around would be a breeze. Gian and Suneo steal an arrow from Doraemon and Nobita, but a dog moves the destination target to a canal causing them to fall into it.
87	"The Snail House Sure is Carefree"; Transliteration: "Den Den Hausu wa Kirakuda na" (Japanese: デンデンハウスは気楽だな)	July 11, 1979
Nobita gets called a liar by his mom when she believes him to be hiding his recent exam. Nobita complains to Doraemon and exchanges his snacks for a snail shell that protects him from his surroundings. Shizuka shows up near the end and returns a journal that holds his exam grade. Nobita's mom apologizes, but is met with Nobita's demands... until she asks him for his grade.
88	"Advertising in Mirrors"; Transliteration: "Kagami de Komāsharu" (Japanese: かがみでコマーシャル)	July 12, 1979
Doraemon and Nobita use a broadcast mirror to advertise a small sweet shop. At first, the advertisement fails to attract customers. But later, a huge crowd gets attracted to the sweet shop.
89	"Baby Manufacturing Machine"; Transliteration: "Ningen Seizō-ki" (Japanese: 人間製造機)	July 13, 1979
Nobita and Shizuka see Gian and Suneo building a model ship in their backyard. Nobita wanted to join, but was rejected because they believed him to be clumsy. Nobita runs back home to build something better or so he claimed. Doraemon left a machine in Nobita's room with an explicit note to not touch it and give to the delivery man from the future. The machine said it would create a lifeform, but it had a defect of creating a strong and more powerful race bent on controlling mankind. Doraemon returned and somehow managed to end it.
90	"We're Gonna Steal Mom's Diamond"; Transliteration: "Mama no Daiya o Nusumidase" (Japanese: ママのダイヤを盗み出せ)	July 14, 1979
Nobita leaves a photo album on the floor. The book brought nostalgia to Nobita's mother and she recalled a story about a precious diamond ring that was passed down in their family, but was stolen by two boys. Nobita and Doraemon go back in time to stop the robbers. The diamond ring turned out to be plastic and was meant for Nobita's mom to be a lesson.
91	"Moving to a Haunted Castle (part 1)"; Transliteration: "Yūrei Shiro e Hikkoshi (Mae)" (Japanese: ゆうれい城へ引っこし（前）)	July 16, 1979
Nobita's parents consider moving, so he and Doraemon convince them to move to an ancient castle owned by a beautiful woman. When she mysteriously disappears, they must rescue her.
92	"Moving to a Haunted Castle (part 2)"; Transliteration: "Yūrei Shito e Hikkoshi (Ato)" (Japanese: ゆうれい城へ引っこし（後）)	July 17, 1979
Nobita and Doraemon continue their rescue attempt.
93	"Swimming Powder"; Transliteration: "Donbura Kona" (Japanese: ドンブラ粉)	July 18, 1979
Nobita cannot swim so Doraemon uses a powder on him which makes him able to swim through the ground or anything else solid as though it were water, so he can learn to swim.
94	"The Love-Love Parasol"; Transliteration: "Ai-ai Parasoru" (Japanese: あいあいパラソル)	July 19, 1979
Doraemon unveils his newest device, the Love-Love Parasol.
95	"Where the Traveling Souvernir Picture Doesn't Go"; Transliteration: "Ikanai Ryokō no Kinen Shashin" (Japanese: 行かない旅行の記念写真)	July 20, 1979
Suneo brags about all the vacation his family has gone on to his friends, but Nobita soon gets annoyed and brags that his family has gone to even more places. Nobita goes home and cries to Doraemon until he pulls out a camera that photoshops Nobita into all kinds of places. When he shows his friends, one of the picture makes everyone realise Nobita's lies, a picture of Nobita on the moon.
96	"Shopping In The Future"; Transliteration: "Mirai kara no Kaimono" (Japanese: 未来からの買いもの)	July 21, 1979
Nobita wants a new bike but his parents cannot afford it, then he comes across a catalog from 2087 and orders and gets many things, not realising that they have to be paid for.
97	"Werewolf Cream"; Transliteration: "Ōkamiotoko Kurīmu" (Japanese: おおかみ男クリーム)	July 23, 1979
Doraemon and Nobita argue who is scarier, a werewolf or mom. Doraemon takes out the werewolf cream to transform himself to prove a point. Mom finds the cream and uses it before heading out to an old friend's house. Doraemon, worried, tags along to prevent mom from transforming whenever she looks at a round object.
98	"A Large Man Went Out"; Transliteration: "Ōotoko ga Deta zo" (Japanese: 大男が出たぞ)	July 24, 1979
The episode starts as Nobita is being beat up by Gian and getting depressed at him so he uses Doraemon's gadget to get revenge.
99	"It's the King in the World of the Night!"; Transliteration: "Yoru no Sekai no Ōsamada!" (Japanese: 夜の世界の王さまだ！)	July 25, 1979
After failing Nobita's test and getting yelled by his mother, he asks Doraemon for a gadget so he can play at night.
100	"The Almighty Pass"; Transliteration: "Ōrumaiti Pasu" (Japanese: オールマイティパス)	July 26, 1979
Doraemon gives Nobita a pass that lets him do whatever he wants. The pass, however, is going to expire at sundown. Nobita who is sort of aware of the situation takes Shizuka out for a day of fun, going to the nearby kid forbidden coffeehouse and a celebrity's house. The pass expires while they are having fun and Nobita and Shizuka are forced to walk home.
101	"The Dictator Switch"; Transliteration: "Dokusai Suicchi" (Japanese: どくさいスイッチ)	July 27, 1979
Nobita wishes Gian had never existed, so Doraemon lends him the Dictator Switch, which makes people disappear. Soon, he makes everyone vanish. At first, Nobita revels in freedom, but upon nightfall, he realises one cannot live alone, prompting Doraemon to appear and set things back to normal.
102	"Borrowing in the Shade"; Transliteration: "Kagegari" (Japanese: かげがり)	July 28, 1979
Nobisuke asks Nobita to weed the garden even though it is a hot day. Doraemon uses the Shadow Cutting Scissors to make Nobita's shadow weed the garden for him. Remade in 1996 under the same title.
103	"The Robot-Control-Training Machine"; Transliteration: "Roketto-Sōjū-Kunren-ki" (Japanese: ロケットそうじゅうくんれん機)	July 30, 1979
Nobita wants to be a space pilot so Doraemon brings out a machine where a remote controlled small saucer gives an impression of being on an alien world, even when in Shizuka's bathroom when she is taking a bath.
104	"The Paddy Field Mat"; Transliteration: "Tatami no Tanbo" (Japanese: タタミの田んぼ)	July 31, 1979
Nobita and Doraemon both like rice cakes but fight over the last one so Doraemon uses a DIY paddy field to grow much rice and a machine to make many rice cakes but with 259 of them to eat, the two still fight over the odd one.
105	"Speed Clock"; Transliteration: "Supīdo Dokei" (Japanese: スピードどけい)	August 1, 1979
Nobita can't wait for a holiday from school so Doraemon gives him a clock which can make the days fly by. Nobita ends up making his vacation fly by as he tries to satisfy everyone.
106	"My Ancestor, The Braggart"; Transliteration: "Hora Fuki Gosenzo" (Japanese: ホラふき御先祖)	August 2, 1979
Nobita asked his dad about his ancestors, after he doesn't know himself, Doraemon uses a gadget to get his ancestor to his time period.
107	"Honest Tāro"; Transliteration: "Shōjikitarō" (Japanese: 正直太郎)	August 3, 1979
Nobita and Doraemon use a gadget to help Nobita's uncle go out with the woman he likes.
108	"Emotion Controller"; Transliteration: "Hyōjō Kontorōrā" (Japanese: 表情コントローラー)	August 4, 1979
109	"Hello, Alien (part 1)"; Transliteration: "Harō Uchūjin (Mae)" (Japanese: ハロー宇宙人（前）)	August 6, 1979
Suneo's story of a UFO inspires Doraemon to fly a martian spaceship.
110	"Hello, Alien (part 2)"; Transliteration: "Harō Uchūhjin (Ato)" (Japanese: ハー宇宙人（後）)	August 7, 1979
Doraemon continues pursuing his dream.
111	"Vero phase prediction bonanza!" Transliteration: "Bero Sō Uranai Ōatari!" (Japanese: ベロ相うらない大当たり！)	August 8, 1979
112	"The Reversion Light"; Transliteration: "Modori Raito" (Japanese: もどりライト)	August 9, 1979
Nobita is doing his schoolwork for once in his life. The project calls for him to learn about the origin of items around his house. Doraemon is happy that Nobita is doing his work, he willingly pulls out a gadget that reverse items to their origin for 15 minutes.
113	"Jekyll and Hyde"; Transliteration: "Jikiru Haido" (Japanese: ジキルハイド)	August 10, 1979
Doraemon gives Nobita pills which can change the user's personality for ten minutes.
114	"One-Shot Answer!"; Transliteration: "Kotae wa Ichi-hatsu! Mikomi Arakajime Hō-ki" (Japanese: 答えは一発！みこみ予ほう機)	August 11, 1979
115	"A Cat Made a Company, Meow"; Transliteration: "Neko ga Kaisha o Tsukutta yo" (Japanese: ネコが会社を作ったよ)	August 13, 1979
Nobita takes four cats off of Shizuka's hands as a favor but his mother doesn't want them in the house. Doraemon uses bracelets to control them and the cats become obedient mousers in the neighborhood.
116	"Girlfriend Catalog"; Transliteration: "Gārufurendo Katarogu" (Japanese: ガールフレンドカタログ)	August 14, 1979
A machine which can predict future girlfriends causes trouble for Nobita when he visits them before they will know him. He realises he is best off with Shizuka.
117	"Pocket Telescope"; Transliteration: "Te ni Tori Bōen Kagami" (Japanese: 手にとり望遠鏡)	August 15, 1979
Gian steals Nobita's yoyo so Doraemon gives him a telescope where when you look at something, you can reach there and pick up something from the scene. Or if an immovable object like a tree, you can travel to the scene.
118	"My Home is Getting Farther and Farther Away"; Transliteration: "Ie ga Dandan Tōku Naru" (Japanese: 家がだんだん遠くなる)	August 16, 1979
Nobita eats a biscuit used to get rid of dogs. Once they leave home they can't find their way back. Nobita tries not to leave home but does and gets lost.
119	"Operation: Y Candle"; Transliteration: "Y-Rō Sakusen" (Japanese: Yロウ作戦)	August 17, 1979
Hearing that Gian will blacklist the baseball players who did poorly including him, Nobita uses the Y Candle from Doraemon to bribe his mother into returning the baseball bat and glove she had confiscated. Then he uses it to bribe Gian into letting him play.
120	"Ran away to Uninhabited Island"; Transliteration: "Mujinto e Iede" (Japanese: 無人島へ家出)	August 18, 1979
Nobita comes home late and gets yelled at by his parents. Nobita runs away from home with some of Doraemon's gadgets. Nobita finds life on the island difficult, but can't find a way home until Doraemon finds him. By the time Doraemon finds him, it has been 10 years and Nobita has grown old. Worried that his parents won't accept him, Nobita and Doraemon travel 10 years to the past and use the time cloth to revert Nobita to his younger self.
121	"I Can't Study in the Sahara Desert"; Transliteration: "Sahara Sabaku de Benkyō wa Dekinai" (Japanese: サハラ砂漠で勉強はできない)	August 20, 1979
Nobita wants a different environment to study in so Doraemon uses a machine which can make the surrounding area look like any place in the world. In the desert scene, they see a man dying of thirst.
122	"Nikmenine"; Transliteration: "Nikimenain" (Japanese: ニクメナイン)	August 21, 1979
123	"The Lying Mirror"; Transliteration: "Usotuki Kagami" (Japanese: うそつきカガミ)	August 22, 1979
Nobita finds a mirror in his room left by Doraemon. Nobita sees how beautiful he looks, but is told by Doraemon that it is a lying mirror. The mirror is able to convince everyone to change their current facial expression to look more 'beautiful'. It has a malicious streak and convinces Nobita he is handsome when he pulls an ugly face.
124	"Peck Rope"; Transliteration: "NageーNagenawa" (Japanese: なげーなげなわ)	August 23, 1979
Suneo comes to return a borrowed umbrella, but Doraemon and Nobita are both too lazy to get up. Doraemon pulls out a rope that lets him retrieve things. Nobita wants to borrow the rope but during Doraemon and Nobita's fight, it gets thrown out the window and into Suneo's hand. Suneo uses the rope to steal and pull practical jokes before escaping and leaving the rope on the ground. Nobita finds the rope and is blamed, but denies that he is able to use the rope. A little girl falls into a nearby ditch, Nobita struggles but still pulls her out with the rope. The girl reveals that it was Suneo that was playing with the rope.
125	"Alien's House"; Transliteration: "Uchūjin no Ie?" (Japanese: 宇宙人の家？)	August 24, 1979
Nobita and his friends make a bet about whether aliens exist by going into a house in the woods that is supposedly alien infested. Nobita returns home and uses Doraemon to help him search the house from far away. Nobita and Doraemon runs away after seeing something, but Gian and Suneo go into the house and explore. It turns out the house was a prop house meant for alien movies.
126	"Head Down to the Path of Evil"; Transliteration: "Aku no Michi o Susume" (Japanese: 悪の道を進め)	August 25, 1979
Nobita is inspired by a book of Great Men and resolves to do good deeds but they all turn out bad. He gets angry and resolves to do bad things, but Doraemon pulls out a gadget to prevent him and somehow all his bad actions turn out good. Remade in 1990 as "Nobita's Wicked Aspiration."
127	"The medicine of boy students and girl students" Transliteration: "Otokon'na o Nomeba!" (Japanese: オトコンナを飲めば！)	August 27, 1979
Nobita's father moans at him because he doesn't like boy's games. Doraemon uses a spray which makes boys behave like girls and girls behave like boys. Nobita doesn't like the result and even less when he finds it has affected his parents too.
128	"The Absconding Leaf"; Transliteration: "Doronpa" (Japanese: ドロン葉)	August 28, 1979
A man mistreats his pet dog. The Pengpeng leaf causes the dog to swap places with its owner, giving it a day of freedom while the man is chained up. The dog goes on to play baseball while the man struggles to escape. After spending the day chained up, the man realises what he's done.
129	"Memory Hammer"; Transliteration: "Wasure Tonkachi" (Japanese: わすれとんかち)	August 29, 1979
A man goes around the houses in the neighborhood trying to find out who he is. Doraemon hits him over the head with the forgotten hammer which causes his memories to be projected on a wall.
130	"Let's Live to Laugh"; Transliteration: "Waratte Kurasou" (Japanese: わらってくらそう)	August 30, 1979
Nobita is so bored he annoys Doraemon into giving him a smiling earphone. When Nobita puts it in his ear, he hears lots of funny stuff which makes him laugh uncontrollably. This first upsets his mother, then his friends who think he is laughing at them.
131	"Moonlight and Bug Voices"; Transliteration: "Tsuki no Hikari to Mushi no Koe" (Japanese: 月の光と虫の声)	August 31, 1979
132	"I Found a Tsuchinoko!"; Transliteration: "Tsuchinoko Mituketa!" (Japanese: ツチノコ見つけた！)	September 1, 1979
Doraemon warns Nobita that Gian will be the one to discover the Tsuchinoko and gain fame for that, so they both travel to the future to bring one Tsuchinoko with them and show off to their friends. The Tsuchinoko sneaks out to Gian, who makes a name for himself as a result.
133	"Space Tarzan (part 1)"; Transliteration: "Uchū Tāzan (Mae)" (Japanese: 宇宙ターザン（前）)	September 3, 1979
Space Tarzan about prehistoric men and spacemen is Nobita's favorite show but he meets the star and finds it has gone over budget too much and is close to being canceled because of falling viewing figures. He decides to help him by going 150 million years into the past to get some real dinosaurs to replace the poor models they use in the show.
134	"Space Tarzan (part 2)"; Transliteration: "Uchū Tāzan (Ato)" (Japanese: 宇宙ターザン（後）)	September 4, 1979
After a few narrow escapes, Doraemon and Nobita feed mealie pellets (which make any animal tame) to a load of dinosaurs. Doraemon fixes his time machine to a hut door so when Tai and his producers walk through the door, they are 150 million years ago. The show becomes a success thanks to the "real looking dinosaurs and scenery" which cost nothing.
135	"Toy Car Training Center"; Transliteration: "Minikā Kyōshū Tokoro" (Japanese: ミニカー教習所)	September 5, 1979
136	"The Soul Machine"; Transliteration: "Tamashīmu Mashin" (Japanese: タマシイムマシン)	September 6, 1979
137	"Even in the Stomach, in the Acid"; Transliteration: "Tatoe I no Nakamizu no Naka" (Japanese: たとえ胃の中水の中)	September 7, 1979
Shizuka is eating peanuts and accidentally swallows her mom's 500,000 yen opal. Nobita and Doraemon use the Suichu Buggy and the Small Light to get into Shizuka's stomach and get the opal out.
138	"The Dream Channel"; Transliteration: "Yume no Channeru" (Japanese: ゆめのチャンネル)	September 8, 1979
Nobita is unable to sleep. Doraemon lends the Dream Channel to Nobita, which lets him watch other people's dreams, including those of Gian, Suneo and Shizuka while criticising the plot of each dream.
139	"Development and Degradation Radiation"; Transliteration: "Shinka Taika Hōsha Hasengen" (Japanese: 進化退化放射線源)	September 10, 1979
Nobita's father is old fashioned, so Nobita uses Doraemon's Progression-Regression Beam to make things as they would have been in the past or future, then starts on living things with a mouse devolved 200,000,000 years to become a large dinosaur and his father evolved into a future man. Remade as The Progression-Regression Beam in the 2005 series.
140	"Super armor" Transliteration: "Urutora Yoroi" (Japanese: ウルトラよろい)	September 11, 1979
141	"Hot Spring Trip"; Transliteration: "Onsen Ryokō" (Japanese: 温泉旅行)	September 12, 1979
Nobita's mother wants to go to the hot springs for a holiday but his father says it is too crowded and hard to get there, so Doraemon sets up 3D projectors around the house which make it look like they are at the hot springs.
142	"If Gian's a superman" Transliteration: "Moshimo Jaian ga Sūpāman ni Nattara" (Japanese: もしもジャイアンがスーパーマンになったら)	September 13, 1979
Nobita finds a super cape, but Gian snatches the cape and uses it to become Super Gian, whose only power is being able to fly when summoned by a whistle. This episode was later remade in 1992 in the same series, then remade as Super Gian, Hero of Justice in the 2005 series.
143	"Human Remote Control"; Transliteration: "Ningen Ayatsuri-ki" (Japanese: 人間あやつり機)	September 14, 1979
144	"The Overexaggerating Overcoat"; Transliteration: "Ōba・Ōba" (Japanese: オーバー・オーバー)	September 15, 1979
Nobita and Shizuka go on an Overexaggerating Overcoat adventure.
145	"The Make-Believe Treasure Hunter Set"; Transliteration: "Takara Sagashi-gokko Setto" (Japanese: 宝さがしごっこセット)	September 17, 1979
146	"The Big Fossil Discovery"; Transliteration: "Kaseki Dai Hakken" (Japanese: 化石大発見)	September 18, 1979
Nobita and Doraemon find an archaeological site with an old man digging the rocks for fossils. While having their breakfast of fish, Nobita comes up with an idea to use the Time Furoshiki and make them 1000 years old, which makes them look like fossils, and bury them at the site.
147	"The Jack in the Box Stick"; Transliteration: "Bikkuri-hako Sutekki" (Japanese: びっくり箱ステッキ)	September 19, 1979
Doraemon gives Nobita the Jack-In-The-Box Stick which when opened summons Japanese monsters.
148	"Slowly reflective eyebrows" Transliteration: "Yukkuri Hansha Shazōkin" (Japanese: ゆっくり反射ぞうきん)	September 20, 1979
149	"Human Eating House"; Transliteration: "Hito-kui Hausu" (Japanese: 人喰いハウス)	September 21, 1979
150	"The Mouse and The Bomb"; Transliteration: "Nezumi to Bakudan" (Japanese: ネズミとばくだん)	September 22, 1979
Doraemon is even more scared of mice than Nobita's mother is and starts shooting at everything that moves when one turns up in the house. Remade as Only Four More Hours Until the Mice Are Driven Away in the 2005 series.
151	"The Just-As-You-Said Pills"; Transliteration: "Sounaru-jō" (Japanese: ソウナルじょう)	September 24, 1979
Doraemon gets Nobita to learn how to swim using the Just-As-You-Said Pills, and they go diving in the sky.
152	"The Esper Hat"; Transliteration: "Esupā Bōshi" (Japanese: エスパーぼうし)	September 25, 1979
Nobita wants to impress Shizuka at her birthday. Therefore, Doraemon takes out the Esper Hat, a tool of ESP training. This episode would later be remade in 1995 as "Esper Cap," and both would later be remade in the 2005 series.
153	"Special Vision Report"; Transliteration: "Kenta Mama Sukōpu" (Japanese: 見たままスコープ)	September 26, 1979
Nobita cannot remember what he has done with the money he and Doraemon has saved. Doraemon uses a machine which projects memories on a wall.
154	"Human Remote Control"; Transliteration: "Ningen Rajikon" (Japanese: 人間ラジコン)	September 27, 1979
Gian is in charge of baseball practice but is a tyrant so Nobita uses a remote control box on Gian which controls him like a robot.
155	"The Famous Knife Denkomaru"; Transliteration: "Meitō 「Denkōmaru」" (Japanese: 名刀「電光丸」)	September 28, 1979
Doraemon gives Nobita a sword called Denkomaru that magnifies the swordsmanship of its wielder.
156	"Magnify Bad Habits Gas"; Transliteration: "Kuse Naoshi Gasu" (Japanese: くせなおしガス)	September 29, 1979
Annoyed by everyone's bad habits, Nobita asked for a gadget. Doraemon pulls out a gadget called Magnify Bad Habits Gas that can turn bad habits into something weird, such as making Nobita's booger turn into a large pink, soft, bouncy ball when he picks his nose.
157	"The Guidance Angel"; Transliteration: "Michibiki Enzeru" (Japanese: ミチビキエンゼル)	October 1, 1979
Doraemon sees that Nobita is bad at making simple decisions, so he gives him a Guidance Angel to help him out.
158	"Disgust Maker"; Transliteration: "Nigate Tsukkuri-ki" (Japanese: にがてつくり機)	October 2, 1979
After Gian tricks Nobita into running away from a worm, something he cannot stand, Doraemon uses a machine to first make Gian scared of puppies, then scared of Nobita.
159	"Fuko, The Typhoon"; Transliteration: "Taifū no Fūko" (Japanese: 台風のフー子)	October 3, 1979
Nobita hatches a 22nd-century egg and out comes a small typhoon, which he treats as a pet. Then Japan suffers a major typhoon which is heading towards their house which has a loose roof and the little typhoon goes out to try and stop it.
160	"Reverse Invisibility Eye Drop"; Transliteration: "Mie-nakunaru Me-gusuri" (Japanese: 見えなくなる目ぐすり)	October 4, 1979
161	"The Rank Badges"; Transliteration: "Kaikyū Wappen" (Japanese: 階級ワッペン)	October 5, 1979
Nobita uses Rank Badges to order his parents around. Remade as Stand to Sergeant Nobita's Attention! in the 2005 series.
162	"Dad's a Mama's Boy, Too"; Transliteration: "Papa mo Amaenbo" (Japanese: パパもあまえんぼ)	October 6, 1979
163	"Unexisting Shower"; Transliteration: "Inai Inai Shawā" (Japanese: いないいないシャワー)	October 8, 1979
To avoid getting hit by Gian, Nobita uses a shower which makes it look like he is several feet away from his actual position, which allows him to kick Gian without retaliation.
164	"The Stone Cap"; Transliteration: "Ishikoro Bōshi" (Japanese: 石ころぼうし)	October 9, 1979
Nobita wishes there was a way to avoid getting attention from everyone. Doraemon pulls out the Pebble Hat and explains to Nobita that the user will become unnoticed like a pebble on the side of the road despite being visible to others.
165	"Predicting Bug"; Transliteration: "Yokan Mushi" (Japanese: よかん虫)	October 10, 1979
Nobita who was born on August 7 checks his astrology in a comic and thinks he is due a good week. Doraemon gives him a small mechanical bug which if you predict something, it can come true. The problem is that Nobita is a pessimist who thinks the worst, and it was last week's comic he was using.
166	"All-in-One Rein"; Transliteration: "Haidō Tazuna" (Japanese: はいどうたづな)	October 11, 1979
167	"Portable National Diet"; Transliteration: "Pōtaburu Kokkai" (Japanese: ポータブル国会)	October 12, 1979
Doraemon presents the Portable National Diet, a tool that manipulates the legislation of the country that the user lives in. To legislate, the user must write a law, then send the envelope to the council, and then the law will be legislated.
168	"Slow-Slow, Quick-Quick"; Transliteration: "Noro-noro Jita-bata" (Japanese: のろのろじたばた)	October 13, 1979
Doraemon believes Nobita is too slow and brings out the Fast and Slow Pills, and plans to use Fast on Nobita to speed him up. However, Nobita wants Doraemon to try it himself, so he takes the pills.
169	"Detecting Badges"; Transliteration: "Torēsā Bajji" (Japanese: トレーサーバッジ)	October 15, 1979
Remade as Tracing With the Tracer Badge in the 2005 series.
170	"I'm Gonna Become a Fine Dad!"; Transliteration: "Rippa na Papa ni Naruzo!" (Japanese: りっぱなパパになるぞ！)	October 16, 1979
Nobita time travels and meets his future self.
171	"Forgetting Bird"; Transliteration: "Wasure Tori" (Japanese: わすれ鳥)	October 17, 1979
Dad is a forgetful person so Doraemon gives him a Forgetting Bird gadget to remind him of the things he had forgotten to take.
172	"Vending Time Machine"; Transliteration: "Jidō Hanbai Taimu Mashin" (Japanese: 自動販売タイムマシン)	October 18, 1979
Doraemon introduces the Vending Time Machine, which can sell anything throughout time. Remade as Shopping Across the Ages in the 2005 series.
173	"Secret Camera"; Transliteration: "Kossori Kamera" (Japanese: こっそりカメラ)	October 19, 1979
174	"The Magic Hand"; Transliteration: "Majikku Hando" (Japanese: マジックハンド)	October 20, 1979
175	"Delay Candy"; Transliteration: "Osoda Ame" (Japanese: おそだアメ)	October 22, 1979
Doraemon introduces the Delay Candy, which can delay the user's voice for 10 minutes.
176	"Grandpa, In the Midst of a Dream"; Transliteration: "Yume Makura no Ojīsan" (Japanese: 夢まくらのおじいさん)	October 23, 1979
177	"Robot Paper"; Transliteration: "Robotto Pēpā" (Japanese: ロボットペーパー)	October 24, 1979
Doraemon introduces the Robot Paper.
178	"Black Belt Nobita"; Transliteration: "Kuro-obi Nobita" (Japanese: 黒おびのび太)	October 25, 1979
179	"The Ultra Mixer"; Transliteration: "Urutora Mikisā" (Japanese: ウルトラミキサー)	October 26, 1979
180	"How to make a Deserted Island"; Transliteration: "Mujintō no Tsukurikata" (Japanese: 無人島の作り方)	October 27, 1979
181	"Typhoon Maker"; Transliteration: "Taifū Hassei-ki" (Japanese: 台風発生機)	October 29, 1979
182	"New Plant Species"; Transliteration: "Shinsu Shokubutsu Seizō-ki" (Japanese: 新種植物せいぞう機)	October 30, 1979
183	"A World Where You Don't Need Money"; Transliteration: "Okane no Iranai Sekai" (Japanese: お金のいらない世界)	October 31, 1979
184	"Abekonbe"; Transliteration: "Abekonbe" (Japanese: アベコンベ)	November 1, 1979
Doraemon introduces the Abekonbe, an arrow that makes everything work in the opposite way.
185	"Dairi Gum"; Transliteration: "Dairi Gamu" (Japanese: ダイリガム)	November 2, 1979
When Gian and Suneo frame Nobita for breaking a man's window, Doraemon gives Nobita the Dairi Gum to make Gian and Suneo confess their mistake.
186	"The Bad Luck Diamond"; Transliteration: "Akūn Daiya" (Japanese: 悪運ダイヤ)	November 3, 1979
187	"Big Money!"; Transliteration: "Okane nanka Daikirai!" (Japanese: お金なんか大きらい！)	November 5, 1979
188	"Sharing Gum"; Transliteration: "Osuzo Wake Gamu" (Japanese: おすそわけガム)	November 6, 1979
189	"The Secret Treasure of Nobizaemon"; Transliteration: "Nobizaemon no Hihō" (Japanese: のび左ェ門の秘宝)	November 7, 1979
190	"The Schedule Clock"; Transliteration: "Sukejāru Dokei" (Japanese: スケジュールどけい)	November 8, 1979
Doraemon helps Nobita make a schedule, but ends up giving HIMSELF a schedule instead and Nobita takes advantage of this.
191	"Ayaushi! Lion Mask"; Transliteration: "Oyaushi! Raion Kamen" (Japanese: あやうし！ライオン仮面)	November 9, 1979
Funyako is sick so Doraemon takes over to draw the comic.
192	"Pero! Come Back to Life"; Transliteration: "Pero! Ikikaette" (Japanese: ペロ！生きかえって)	November 10, 1979
Doraemon and Nobita go back to the night before Shizuka's pet dog died and try to prevent his death.
193	"Gian's Spirit Friend"; Transliteration: "Jaian no Kokoro no Tomo" (Japanese: ジャイアンの心の友)	November 12, 1979
194	"The Castaway Story from Long Ago"; Transliteration: "Ōmukashi Hyōryū-ki" (Japanese: 大むかし漂流記)	November 13, 1979
Because of Nobita's research, Doraemon decides to take him to the past. However, they get stranded on an island and must find a way to return to the present.
195	"The Anywhere Cannon"; Transliteration: "Doko demo Taihō" (Japanese: どこでも大ほう)	November 14, 1979
Doraemon introduces the Anywhere Cannon. Its user can blast off to wherever they want to go.
196	"Flying Fish"; Transliteration: "Sora Tobu-Sakana" (Japanese: 空とぶさかな)	November 15, 1979
197	"Nobita's Nobita"; Transliteration: "Nobita no Nobita" (Japanese: のび太ののび太)	November 16, 1979
Nobita drafts an itinerary and goes to each time period to remind himself in the future on what he should do.
198	"Hii Tree"; Transliteration: "Hii-ki" (Japanese: ひい木)	November 17, 1979
199	"Sherlock Holmes Set"; Transliteration: "Shārokku・Hōmuzu Setto" (Japanese: シャーロック・ホームズセット)	November 19, 1979
Using the Sherlock Holmes Set, Nobita tries solving two cases with Doraemon, yet ends up realising both cases are connected as he is unknowingly the causer of both.
200	"Small Person Robot"; Transliteration: "Kodomo Robotto" (Japanese: 小人ロボット)	November 20, 1979
201	"The One Inch Boy"; Transliteration: "Issun-bōshi" (Japanese: いっすんぼうし)	November 21, 1979
This episode is based on a Japanese fairy tale called Issun-bōshi.
202	"The Dress-Up Camera"; Transliteration: "Kisekae Kamera" (Japanese: きせかえカメラ)	November 22, 1979
Gian and Suneo get hold of one of Doraemon's devices.
203	"Kanarazu Ataru Tesō Setto" (Japanese: かならず当たる手相セット)	November 23, 1979
Nobita worries about his fate, so Doraemon takes out the One Hundred Percent Accurate Palm Reading Set to make his life better.
204	"The All-Season Badge"; Transliteration: "Ōru-Shīzun Bajji" (Japanese: オールシーズンバッチ)	November 24, 1979
Nobita and Doraemon try to control the seasons.
205	"The Guardian Mantle"; Transliteration: "Hirari Manto" (Japanese: ひらりマント)	November 26, 1979
206	"Dream Walker"; Transliteration: "Tachiyumebō" (Japanese: 立ちユメぼう)	November 27, 1979
After seeing Doraemon wearing a special gadget called the Dream Walker, Nobita wears it and goes on an adventure.
207	"Let's Move All Over the Place"; Transliteration: "Achikochi Hikkosō" (Japanese: あちこちひっこそう)	November 28, 1979
208	"An Emotional, Heart-Touching Expression"; Transliteration: "Jīn to Kandō suru Hanashi" (Japanese: ジーンと感動する話)	November 29, 1979
209	"The In-Advance Diary is Horrible"; Transliteration: "Arakajime Nikki wa Osoroshī" (Japanese: あらかじめ日記はおそろしい)	November 30, 1979
210	"The Reality Pillow"; Transliteration: "Utsutsu Makura" (Japanese: うつつまくら)	December 1, 1979
After a good dream, Doraemon gives Nobita The Reality Pillow.
211	"Hakoiwa Ski Resort"; Transliteration: "Hakoiwa Sukī-ba" (Japanese: はこ庭スキー場)	December 3, 1979
212	"Tea Pot Tape Recorder"; Transliteration: "Yakan Rekōdā" (Japanese: ヤカンレコーダー)	December 4, 1979
213	"Touch Gloves"; Transliteration: "Tacchi Tebukuro" (Japanese: タッチ手ぶくろ)	December 5, 1979
214	"The Snow's Hot, Hot, Hot!"; Transliteration: "Yumi de Acchi-cchi" (Japanese: 雪でアッチッチ)	December 6, 1979
Doraemon applies a special gadget on himself and Nobita called Turvy Topsy Cream which makes hot and cold reverse.
215	"The Regular Pen"; Transliteration: "Naisho-pen" (Japanese: ないしょペン)	December 7, 1979
216	"I'll Be the King of the Stone Age"; Transliteration: "Sekki Jidai no Ō-sama ni" (Japanese: 石器時代の王さまに)	December 8, 1979
217	"Lighter Play"; Transliteration: "Raitā Shibai" (Japanese: ライター芝居)	December 10, 1979
Doraemon introduces Nobita to the Scenario Lighter that allows the cast to enact a scene as if they were in a play.
218	"Play with dolls" Transliteration: "Ningyō Asobi" (Japanese: 人形あそび)	December 11, 1979
219	"Ghost Lamp"; Transliteration: "Kaidan Ranpu" (Japanese: 怪談ランプ)	December 12, 1979
220	"Sweets Ranch"; Transliteration: "Okashi Bokujō" (Japanese: おかし牧草)	December 13, 1979
Doraemon shows Nobita a farm full of sweet snacks.
221	"Sesame Lock"; Transliteration: "Goma Rokku" (Japanese: ゴマロック)	December 14, 1979
222	"The Graffiti Gun"; Transliteration: "Rakugaki Jū" (Japanese: らくがきじゅう)	December 15, 1979
223	"Becoming Faceless with an Eraser"; Transliteration: "Keshigomu de Nopperabō" (Japanese: 消しゴムでノッペラボウ)	December 17, 1979
When Nobita becomes depressed over his looks, Doraemon shows him a gadget that erases a person's facial features and enables him to draw on an entirely new face.
224	"The Odd, Odd Umbrellas"; Transliteration: "Okashina Okashina Kasa" (Japanese: おかしなおかしなかさ)	December 18, 1979
On a rainy day, Doraemon utilises a variety of strange umbrellas.
225	"Pitcher's Hat"; Transliteration: "Ēsu Kyappu" (Japanese: エースキャップ)	December 19, 1979
226	"Comic Book's Extras from One Hundred Years Later"; Transliteration: "Hyaku-nen-go no Furoku" (Japanese: 百年後のフロク)	December 20, 1979
Nobita wants to read the comic books of the 22nd century.
227	"Main character package machine" Transliteration: "Shuyaku Hamekomi-ki" (Japanese: 主役はめこみ機)	December 21, 1979
228	"Hardship Miso"; Transliteration: "Kurō Miso" (Japanese: くろうみそ)	December 22, 1979
Doraemon introduces the Hardship Miso. One taste of this miso, and anything one does will end up being hard and painful. Remade in 1992 under the same title.
229	"The Forceful Athletic House"; Transliteration: "Asurechikku Hausu" (Japanese: アスレチックハウス)	December 24, 1979
Doraemon is sick of Nobita being lazy so he turns the house into an athletic house. However, while Doraemon was turning on the machine, Nobita went outside.
230	"Lottery Jackpot Strategy"; Transliteration: "Takarakuji Ōatari" (Japanese: 宝くじ大当たり)	December 25, 1979
Dad wastes money on the lottery, so Doraemon and Nobita try to get the ticket of the win number using the time machine.
231	"Multiplication Liquid"; Transliteration: "Baibain" (Japanese: バイバイン)	December 26, 1979
Nobita doesn't want to lose his chestnut bun, so he takes out the Multiplication Liquid that multiplies anything every five minutes with a drop.
232	"Go Home, You Unwanted Guest!"; Transliteration: "Iyana Okyaku no Kaeshi-hō" (Japanese: いやなお客の帰し方)	December 27, 1979
233	"Battle of Handmade Missile"; Transliteration: "Tezukuri Misairu Dai Sakusen" (Japanese: 手づくりミサイル大作戦)	December 28, 1979
Nobita makes a missile in order to take revenge on Gian.
234	"Making a Little Brother"; Transliteration: "Otōto o Tsukurou" (Japanese: 弟をつくろう)	December 29, 1979
235	"The Sonic Oscillation Terror Machine"; Transliteration: "Kyō Onpa Hasshin-ki" (Japanese: 狂音波発信機)	December 31, 1979
Doraemon takes out the Sonic Oscillation Terror Machine, which converts high decibel sounds into a sound wave that rids the house of pests. Nobita decides to use Gian's terrible singing and invites him over to his house to sing. Nobita later begins an exterminating company and invites Gian over to their classmates' houses to get rid of the pests with Gian's destructive voice.

== 1980 ==
No.	Title	Original release date
S2	"Doraemon's Time Capsule for 2001"; Transliteration: "Taimu Mashin de Oshōgatsu" (Japanese: タイムマシンでお正月)	January 1, 1980
S3	"Doraemon's Surprised All Encyclopedia"; Transliteration: "Doraemon no Bikkuri Zen Hyakka" (Japanese: ドラえもんのびっくり全百科)	January 2, 1980
Doraemon brings Nobita to the robot factory of the future to see how he is made.
S4	"The Elephant and the Uncle"; Transliteration: "Zō to Ojisan" (Japanese: ゾウとおじさん)	January 3, 1980
Nobita's paternal uncle Nobiro pays a visit to share his experiences with an elephant.
236	"Something is Gonna Occur by 7 o'clock" Transliteration: "Shichi-toki ni Nanika ga Okoru" (Japanese: 七時に何かがおこる)	January 4, 1980
Nobita got a zero on his paper and is afraid of telling his mom the truth. So Doraemon gets out the Guiding Machine gadget which produces a fortune telling him to wait until 7pm to tell mom.
237	"The Switching Rope"; Transliteration: "Irekae Rōpu" (Japanese: 入れかえロープ)	January 5, 1980
Nobita uses the Substitution Rope to switch identities with Gian and become stronger than him, but soon mixes up his identity with Doraemon, Shizuka and a dog as well. (Not to be confused with a 1986 episode with a similar title)
238	"Mad Watch"; Transliteration: "Maddo・Uocchi" (Japanese: マッド・ウオッチ)	January 7, 1980
239	"Window Scenery Switching Machine"; Transliteration: "Mado Keshiki Torikae-ki" (Japanese: まどけしきとりかえ機)	January 8, 1980
240	"The Great Avalanche in My Room"; Transliteration: "Benkyǒ Beya no Ō-Nadare" (Japanese: 勉強べやの大なだれ)	January 9, 1980
241	"King Kong"; Transliteration: "Kingu Kongu" (Japanese: キングコング)	January 10, 1980
242	"I'm Mari-chan (part 1)"; Transliteration: "Boku, Mari-chan yo (Mae)" (Japanese: ぼく、マリちゃんだよ（前）)	January 11, 1980
Learning that teen idol Mari Marui is having a shoot at a nearby park, Doraemon and Nobita go there along with Gian, Suneo and Shizuka, but she is nowhere to be found. Mari, who is tired of her daily routine arranged by her manager mother, wishes to take a break, so she switches places with Nobita using the Substitution Bar.
243	"I'm Mari-chan (part 2)"; Transliteration: "Boku, Mari-chan yo (Ato)" (Japanese: ぼく、マリちゃんだよ（後）)	January 12, 1980
Nobita, as Mari, is hesitant to go on stage to film the music segment. Mrs. Marui becomes angry with her.
244	"Party Image"; Transliteration: "Imējitō" (Japanese: イメージとう)	January 14, 1980
245	"Skiing in the Park!!"; Transliteration: "Kōen de Sukī o!!" (Japanese: 公園でスキーを!!)	January 15, 1980
246	"Dream Wind Chime"; Transliteration: "Yume Fūrin" (Japanese: ゆめふうりん)	January 16, 1980
Doraemon is ashamed when Nobita says he wants to be the neighborhood bully when he grows up.
247	"I have small plate" Transliteration: "Itadaki Shō-ban" (Japanese: いただき小ばん)	January 17, 1980
248	"Owner addressed to machine" Transliteration: "Mochinushi Ate-ki" (Japanese: 持ち主あて機)	January 18, 1980
249	"Push Door"; Transliteration: "Pusshu Doa" (Japanese: プッシュドア)	January 19, 1980
250	"Robots"; Transliteration: "Robottā" (Japanese: ロボッター)	January 21, 1980
251	"Magic Replaced Stick"; Transliteration: "Migawari Bā" (Japanese: 身がわりバー)	January 22, 1980
252	"The Story of Taking Off Your Body's Skin"; Transliteration: "Karada no Kawa o Hagu Hanashi" (Japanese: からだの皮をはぐ話)	January 23, 1980
Nobita laments to Doraemon about Gian forcing him to be the model for a drawing session. Doraemon uses the Molting Light on Nobita and makes a skin for Nobita to act as a substitute model.
253	"Time Piggy Bank"; Transliteration: "Jikan Chokin Bako" (Japanese: 時間貯金箱)	January 24, 1980
254	"Telepathy Fruit"; Transliteration: "Terepashī" (Japanese: テレパしい)	January 25, 1980
255	"This picture is 6,000,000 yen" Transliteration: "Kono E 600-Man-en" (Japanese: この絵600万円)	January 26, 1980
256	"The What-If Phone Box"; Transliteration: "Moshimo Bokkusu" (Japanese: もしもボックス)	January 28, 1980
Nobita laments that he does not want to play stupid games. Doraemon takes out the What-If Phone Booth and enters a world without kite-flying, badminton games and spinning tops.
257	"Knob Endowment Contact"; Transliteration: "Yōrō Otsumami" (Japanese: ようろうおつまみ)	January 29, 1980
258	"I'm Going to Transfer this Cold"; Transliteration: "Kono Kaze Utsushimasu" (Japanese: このかぜうつします)	January 30, 1980
Nobita's Dad is having a terrible fever, but doesn't want to miss an important meeting. Nobita uses Doraemon's Cold Transferrer to transfer his cold to him so he can go to the meeting. Doraemon and Nobita then try to transfer the cold to someone else.
259	"Telepath Robot"; Transliteration: "Terepasu Robotto" (Japanese: テレパスロボット)	January 31, 1980
260	"Playing in the sky is dangerous" Transliteration: "Sora de Asonjābunai yo" (Japanese: 空であそんじゃあぶないよ)	February 1, 1980
261	"Invisible Telescope"; Transliteration: "Sukesuke Bōen Kagami" (Japanese: スケスケ望遠鏡)	February 2, 1980
262	"Monomose"; Transliteration: "Monomōsu" (Japanese: モノモース)	February 4, 1980
263	"Wilderness in the Room"; Transliteration: "Heya no Naka no Dai Shizen" (Japanese: へやの中の大自然)	February 5, 1980
264	"Animals will be sprinkling" Transliteration: "Dōbutsu-gata Nidedashi Jō" (Japanese: 動物がたにげだしじょう)	February 6, 1980
265	"Pill Forcing Weight"; Transliteration: "Ya Sēru" (Japanese: ヤセール)	February 7, 1980
266	"The Mallet Of Good Luck"; Transliteration: "Uchi de no Shōzuchi" (Japanese: うちでの小づち)	February 8, 1980
267	"Actual object solar camera" Transliteration: "Jitsubutsu Rittai Nikkō Shashin" (Japanese: 実物立体日光写真)	February 9, 1980
268	"The Story with the Disaster Around"; Transliteration: "Sainan ni Kakoma reta Hanashi" (Japanese: さいなんにかこまれた話)	February 11, 1980
269	"Sell the Night"; Transliteration: "Yoru o Urimasu" (Japanese: 夜を売ります)	February 12, 1980
270	"The Understanding and Thankfulness Machine"; Transliteration: "Arigatami Wakari-ki" (Japanese: アリガタミワカリ機)	February 13, 1980
Wanting Nobita to understand what it's like to be starving, Doraemon takes out the Understanding and Thankfulness Machine so Nobita will cherish his food. Remade in 1990 as "Mama's Appreciation."
271	"Gian Stew"; Transliteration: "Jaian Shichū" (Japanese: ジャイアンシチュー)	February 14, 1980
Nobita, Shizuka and Suneo are horrified when Gian tells them his dream is to be a food investigator and that he's going to cook them all a meal. Nobita tells Doraemon everything and he takes out the Super Gourmet Spice, which makes anything taste good.
272	"Room Marathon"; Transliteration: "Rūmu Marason" (Japanese: ルームマラソン)	February 15, 1980
273	"News Publisher Game"; Transliteration: "Shinbun-sha Gokko Setto" (Japanese: 新聞社ごっこセット)	February 18, 1980
274	"Pandora's Box"; Transliteration: "Pandora Bokkusu" (Japanese: パンドラボックス)	February 19, 1980
275	"Full speed ahead with the "Rajikon Simulator""; Transliteration: "Rajikon Shumirētā de Buttobase" (Japanese: ラジコンシュミレーターでぶっとばせ)	February 20, 1980
276	"Muscle Controller"; Transliteration: "Kinniku Kontorōrā" (Japanese: 筋肉コントローラー)	February 21, 1980
277	"Feeling Instrumentpanel"; Transliteration: "Gokiban Mētā" (Japanese: ごきげんメーター)	February 22, 1980
278	"Hypnosis Machine"; Transliteration: "Saimin-ki" (Japanese: さいみん機)	February 23, 1980
279	"The Automatic Pawnshop"; Transliteration: "Jidō Shichiya-ki" (Japanese: 自動質屋機)	February 25, 1980
280	"Quiz Game Machine"; Transliteration: "Kuizu Gēmu Mashin" (Japanese: クイズゲームマシン)	February 26, 1980
281	"The Global Evacuation Plan"; Transliteration: "Chikyū Dasshutsu Keikaku" (Japanese: 地球脱出計画)	February 27, 1980
282	"If the Robot Praises"; Transliteration: "Robotto ga Homereba" (Japanese: ロボットがほめれば)	February 28, 1980
283	"Romance in the Snowy Mountain"; Transliteration: "Yukiyama no Romansu" (Japanese: 雪山のロマンス)	February 29, 1980
Nobita wants to know if he marries Shizuka and Doraemon pulls out the Time TV to see into the future. They see Shizuka is stuck on a terrible blizzard alone. Remade in 1989 under the same name.
284	"The Forgetting Flower"; Transliteration: "Wasurero Hana" (Japanese: わすれろ草)	March 1, 1980
Nobita uses the Forgetting Flower to make Gian forget that he was the one who drew funny drawings of Gian and Suneo. Later Suneo steals it to have some fun as well. Remade in 1992 as "Let You Smell The Forgetting Flower."
285	"Hardship Counter"; Transliteration: "Hyaku Ku Taimā" (Japanese: 百苦タイマー)	March 3, 1980
286	"Muriyari Torepan"; Transliteration: "Muriyari Torepan" (Japanese: ムリヤリトレパン)	March 4, 1980
287	"The Courtesy Candy"; Transliteration: "Shitsuke Kyandē" (Japanese: しつけキャンデー)	March 5, 1980
Doraemon uses The Courtesy Candy to teach some manners.
288	"The Virtuality Cap"; Transliteration: "Jikkanbō" (Japanese: 実感帽)	March 6, 1980
289	"Brotherly Seal"; Transliteration: "Kyōdai Shīru" (Japanese: 兄弟シール)	March 7, 1980
290	"The Invincible Red Insect"; Transliteration: "Konchū Tan" (Japanese: コンチュー丹)	March 8, 1980
291	"Time Machine"; Transliteration: "Taimu Mashin" (Japanese: タイムマシン)	March 10, 1980
292	"Inorganic Soporific Megaphone"; Transliteration: "Museibutsu Sai Min Megafon" (Japanese: 無生物さいみんメガフォン)	March 11, 1980
293	"The Railroad Crossing Kit"; Transliteration: "Fumikiri Setto" (Japanese: ふみきりセット)	March 12, 1980
294	"Thrilling Boomerang"; Transliteration: "Surinru Būmeran" (Japanese: スリルブーメラン)	March 13, 1980
295	"The Millionaire Straw"; Transliteration: "Chōja Warashibe" (Japanese: チョージャワラシベ)	March 14, 1980
296	"The Debut of the Mood-Changing Orchestra!"; Transliteration: "Mūdo Moriage Gakudan Tōjō!" (Japanese: ムードもり上げ楽団登場！)	March 15, 1980
It seems to Doraemon that Nobita has no moods for anything, so he gives him a gadget called the Mood-Changing Orchestra that plays music according to the type of environment they are in. Nobita takes the gadget outside but gets into some trouble.
297	"Homing Missile"; Transliteration: "Misairu ga Ottekuru" (Japanese: ミサイルが追ってくる)	March 17, 1980
298	"The Yes-M'Lord Drops"; Transliteration: "Kōmon-jō" (Japanese: コーモンじょう)	March 18, 1980
299	"The Delivery Phone"; Transliteration: "Demae Denwa" (Japanese: 出前電話)	March 19, 1980
300	"The Ticked-Off Timer"; Transliteration: "Mushakusha-kātto Kitara" (Japanese: ムシャクシャカーっときたら)	March 20, 1980
301	"Salvation Pill At The Eleventh Hour"; Transliteration: "Pinchi no Toki ni Tasukeron" (Japanese: ピンチの時にタスケロン)	March 21, 1980
302	"Talk Badge"; Transliteration: "Ohanashi Bajji" (Japanese: おはなしバッジ)	March 22, 1980
303	"The Head of the Gorgon"; Transliteration: "Kyōfu!! Gorugon no Kubi" (Japanese: 恐怖!!ゴルゴンの首)	March 24, 1980
In order to make standing outside the classroom more bearable, Doraemon gives Nobita The Head of the Gorgon which petrifies any area that's been exposed by its light. However, when the gadget runs loose and starts petrifying everyone, it's up to Nobita, Doraemon, Gian and Suneo to stop the head before it turns everyone into stone. This episode was later remade in 1990.
304	"The Couple Test Badges"; Transliteration: "Kappuru Tesuto Bajji" (Japanese: カップルテストバッジ)	March 25, 1980
Nobita worries about his future with Shizuka so Doraemon gives him a badge that will let him experience marriage with whoever has the other badge. When Shizuka puts it on she believes she is really married to Nobita. Things go wrong when Suneo finds a badge and puts it on.
305	"Chain Letter Club"; Transliteration: "Fukō no Tegami Dōkō Kai" (Japanese: 不幸の手紙同好会)	March 26, 1980
306	"The Talent Painter Who Could Draw Outlook Cap Without Rim"; Transliteration: "Mita Mama Berē de Tensai Gaka" (Japanese: みたままベレーで天才画家)	March 27, 1980
307	"Visional Call System"; Transliteration: "Kakū Tsūwa Adaputā" (Japanese: 架空通話アダプター)	March 28, 1980
308	"My Love Just Won't Stop~Meow"; Transliteration: "Suki de Tamare~nya" (Japanese: 好きでたまらニャイ)	March 29, 1980
309	"Shizuka's Magic Robe"; Transliteration: "Shizu-chan no Hagoromo" (Japanese: しずちゃんのはごろも)	March 31, 1980
310	"It floats in the sky" Transliteration: "Sora de Fuwafuwa" (Japanese: 空でふわふわ)	April 1, 1980
311	"The Multi-Purpose Charm"; Transliteration: "Tamokuteki Omamori" (Japanese: 多目的おまもり)	April 2, 1980
312	"Draw Cartoon in Can"; Transliteration: "「Kanzumekan」 de Manga o!" (Japanese: 「かんづめかん」でまんがを！)	April 3, 1980
313	"The Tax Bird"; Transliteration: "Zēkin Tori" (Japanese: 税金鳥)	April 4, 1980
Doraemon introduces The Tax Bird, which can take the money from someone else like Gian.
314	"The Explosion Pepper"; Transliteration: "Bakuhatsu Koshō" (Japanese: ばくはつこしょう)	April 7, 1980
Nobita is late to school again, so Doraemon shows him a gadget that can be sprinkled on another person, causing him or her to sneeze. Nobita overuses it, but Gian steals it and starts terrorising the neighborhood kids.
315	"The Liquid Fecit the Force Scope"; Transliteration: "Nawabariekisu" (Japanese: ナワバリエキス)	April 8, 1980
S5	"Dora・Q・Perman"; Transliteration: "Dora・Q・Perman" (Japanese: ドラ.Q.パーマン)	April 8, 1980
A crossover special of Doraemon, Perman and Obake no Q-tarō.
S6	"Dorami's Appearance: Nobita's Hiking Submarine"; Transliteration: "Omatase Dorami-chan Hatsu Tōjō! Nobita no Kaitei Haikingu!" (Japanese: おまたせ ドラミちゃん初登場! のび太の海底ハイキング)	April 8, 1980
S7	"Surprised All Encyclopedia: Doraemon and Dorami-chan"; Transliteration: "Bikkuri Zen Hyakka - Doraemon to Dorami-chan-" (Japanese: びっくり全百科 -ドラえもんとドラミちゃん-)	April 8, 1980
Nobita and the group are introduced to Doraemon's younger sister, Dorami-chan. Remade as Doraemon and Dorami-chan in the 2005 series.
316	"The Weather Sheet"; Transliteration: "Kishō Shīto" (Japanese: 気象シート)	April 9, 1980
317	"The Universal Remote Control"; Transliteration: "Maji・Kon te nanda?" (Japanese: マジ・コンてなんだ？)	April 10, 1980
318	"The Lost-Item Delivery Machine"; Transliteration: "Wasuremono Okuri Todoke-ki" (Japanese: わすれ物おくりとどけ機)	April 11, 1980
319	"Change To Clouds...?"; Transliteration: "Kumo ni natte...?" (Japanese: 雲になって...？)	April 14, 1980
320	"Chip Pocket Two-Dimensional Camera"; Transliteration: "Chippoketto 2-jigen Kamera" (Japanese: チッポケット2次元カメラ)	April 15, 1980
321	"A Hot Blood Support Microphone"; Transliteration: "「Omoikomin」" (Japanese: 「オモイコミン」)	April 16, 1980
Nobita takes a placebo pill that makes his thoughts come true and uses it to make difficult tasks easy.
322	"Hypnosis Glasses"; Transliteration: "Saimin Gurasu" (Japanese: さいみんグラス)	April 17, 1980
323	"The Blue Bird of Happiness"; Transliteration: "Shiawase o Yabu Aoi Tori" (Japanese: しあわせをよぶ青い鳥)	April 18, 1980
324	"Mountain Climbing In The Garden"; Transliteration: "Niwa de Yami no Bori" (Japanese: 庭で山のぼり)	April 21, 1980
325	"Canned Noise"; Transliteration: "Sōon Kōgai o Kanzume ni Shichae" (Japanese: 騒音公害をカンヅメにしちゃえ)	April 22, 1980
326	"The Ultra Super Batteries"; Transliteration: "Urutora Sūpā Denchi" (Japanese: ウルトラスーパー電池)	April 23, 1980
327	"Miniwind"; Transliteration: "Mini Taifū" (Japanese: ミニたいふう)	April 24, 1980
328	"Let's Make A Dorayaki With Bacteria"; Transliteration: "Saikin de Dorayaki o Tsukurou" (Japanese: 細菌でドラやきを作ろう)	April 25, 1980
329	"Save The Beetle!"; Transliteration: "Kurobē o Sukue!" (Japanese: 黒べえをすくえ!)	April 28, 1980
330	"The Speedwinder"; Transliteration: "Neji Maite Hassuru!" (Japanese: ネジまいてハッスル！)	April 29, 1980
331	"Plan of Shoot"; Transliteration: "Kage Tori Purojekutā" (Japanese: 影取りプロジェクター)	April 30, 1980
332	"The Money Hasn't Enough"; Transliteration: "Shitenai Chokin o Tsukau-hō" (Japanese: してない貯金を使う法)	May 1, 1980
333	"Energetic Shill"; Transliteration: "Genki Esa" (Japanese: 元気エサ)	May 2, 1980
S8	"Nobita's "Dream Gold Metal""; Transliteration: "Nobita no 「Yume no Kin Medaru」" (Japanese: のび太の「夢の金メダル」)	May 5, 1980
334	"Water Gas"; Transliteration: "Mizuzoku-kan Gasu" (Japanese: 水ぞくかんガス)	May 6, 1980
335	"Let's Increase the Holidays"; Transliteration: "Shukusai Nichi o Fuyasō" (Japanese: 祝祭日をふやそう)	May 7, 1980
336	"Cooperate with Examinees!"; Transliteration: "Jukensei ni Kyōryoku!" (Japanese: 受験生に協力！)	May 8, 1980
337	"Butterfly"; Transliteration: "Chōcho" (Japanese: ちょうちょ)	May 9, 1980
338	"The Deluxe Light"; Transliteration: "Derakkusu Raito" (Japanese: デラックスライト)	May 12, 1980
Doraemon shows Nobita a special gadget that can turn ordinary items into deluxe models. Nobita goes wild by deluxifying everything including Doraemon himself and discovers that deluxe items aren't always better.
339	"It's The Secret Passage To Run Away"; Transliteration: "Himitsu no Nuke Ana" (Japanese: 秘密のぬけ穴)	May 13, 1980
340	"Michisuji Card"; Transliteration: "Michisuji Kādo" (Japanese: みちすじカード)	May 14, 1980
341	"I Got on a Steam Locomotive"; Transliteration: "Jōki Kikan-sha ni Notta yo" (Japanese: 蒸気機関車に乗ったよ)	May 15, 1980
342	"Combination Of Watching Free Of Charge"; Transliteration: "Tadaken Setto" (Japanese: ただ見セット)	May 16, 1980
343	"Attractive Replusion Gas"; Transliteration: "Inryoku Saegiri Gasu" (Japanese: 引力さえぎりガス)	May 19, 1980
344	"Spider Web Cable"; Transliteration: "Kumoiton" (Japanese: クモイトン)	May 20, 1980
345	"Here's a Pussy"; Transliteration: "Koko Hore Nyan-nyan" (Japanese: ここほれニャンニャン)	May 21, 1980
346	"The Devil's Hand is Approaching!"; Transliteration: "Akuma no Te ga Semaru!" (Japanese: 魔の手がせまる！)	May 22, 1980
347	"Our Own House"; Transliteration: "Bokutachi Dake no Ie" (Japanese: ぼくたちだけの家)	May 23, 1980
348	"The Money Bees Are Working Hard"; Transliteration: "Kanebachi wa Yoku Hataraku" (Japanese: カネバチはよく働く)	May 26, 1980
349	"Gravity Machine"; Transliteration: "Jūryoku Chōsetsu-ki" (Japanese: 重力ちょうせつ機)	May 27, 1980
350	"I'm a Magician!"; Transliteration: "Boku wa Tejinashi!" (Japanese: ぼくは手品師！)	May 28, 1980
351	"Obtaining Bag"; Transliteration: "Toriyose Baggu" (Japanese: とりよせバッグ)	May 29, 1980
352	"Fancy Lens"; Transliteration: "Kūsō Renzu" (Japanese: 空想レンズ)	May 30, 1980
353	"Reverse"; Transliteration: "Gyaku Modoshi" (Japanese: 逆もどし)	June 2, 1980
354	"Shogeki Wave Pistol"; Transliteration: "Shōgeki Nami Pisutoru" (Japanese: しょうげき波ピストル)	June 3, 1980
355	"The Sniffy Octopus"; Transliteration: "Sukan-tako" (Japanese: スカンタコ)	June 4, 1980
356	"Sound Bakachon"; Transliteration: "Saundo Bakachon" (Japanese: サウンドバカチョン)	June 5, 1980
357	"Radio Control Soil"; Transliteration: "Rajukon Nentsuchi" (Japanese: ラジコンねん土)	June 6, 1980
358	"Happy Little Planet"; Transliteration: "Shiawase no Ohoshi-sama" (Japanese: しあわせのお星さま)	June 9, 1980
359	"With The Almighty Camp You'll Have A Great Camping"; Transliteration: "Bannō Tento de Sutekina Kyanpu" (Japanese: 万能テントですてきなキャンプ)	June 10, 1980
360	"Future Checkbook"; Transliteration: "Mirai Kogitte-chō" (Japanese: 未来小切手帳)	June 11, 1980
It starts with Nobita asking his mother for money. She refuses and says to Doraemon that she will give it to him the next day, but he wants it today because of the new comic book series he hasn't bought, and his friends did and will laugh at him if he hasn't bought the comic. Doraemon gives him a checkbook out of his 4D pocket and tells him to write the amount of money on the check and sign it. Nobita writes the amount of money for the comic book, but accidentally writes 1500 yen. Nobita fears that the cashier will not accept, but he successfully buys the book and the cashier gives him 1350 yen. Nobita buys a box of toy airplanes, three cars, a big house and gives Suneo and Gian 1000 yen each with the checkbook. Nobita's mother and uncle give him money but the envelope is empty. He asks Doraemon about this, but he tells him that the checkbook's money is from a future deposit to take out and it was all used up so the envelope is empty. Doraemon takes out a calculator and finds out there will be no more money for Nobita until he is 43 years old and it is Summer. Doraemon tells him to ask the cashier for check refunds and he leaves while Doraemon sleeps.
361	"Mini Pet Lion"; Transliteration: "Mini Petto Raion" (Japanese: ミニペットライオン)	June 12, 1980
It starts with Nobita and Gian playing and Suneo brings the Dog King and says that if anyone disobeys him, he will punish the one who disobeyed. This makes Nobita angry and he and Doraemon catch a lion. The lion later develops a friendship with Nobita but they send the lion back to its place. Before that, he met the Dog King in the night. After sending the lion back, Suneo tells Nobita to kneel down at the Dog King, which he refuses. Suneo tells the Dog King to punish Nobita, but he runs away instead.
362	"Universal Glass"; Transliteration: "Bannō Gurasu" (Japanese: 万能グラス)	June 13, 1980
363	"Transform with the Dracula Set!"; Transliteration: "Dorakyura Setto" (Japanese: ドラキュラセット)	June 16, 1980
Doraemon introduces a gadget that allows the user to wipe away Shizuka, Suneo and Gian's embarrassing memory of Nobita being scared of Dracula.
364	"Take a Commemorative Photo with a Thought Camera"; Transliteration: "Nensha Kamera de Kinen Shashin o" (Japanese: 念写カメラで記念写真を)	June 17, 1980
365	"Let's Ride the Blue Train"; Transliteration: "Burū Torain ni Norō" (Japanese: ブルートレインにのろう)	June 18, 1980
366	"The Happy Promenade"; Transliteration: "Happī Puromanādo" (Japanese: ハッピープロムナード)	June 19, 1980
367	"The Time Scope"; Transliteration: "Kirikae-shiki Taimu Sukōpu" (Japanese: 切りかえ式タイムスコープ)	June 20, 1980
368	"Katakiuchi at Chushin Kura"; Transliteration: "Chūshin Kara de Karakiuchi" (Japanese: チューシン倉でかたきうち)	June 23, 1980
369	"Time, Stop"; Transliteration: "Jikan yo, Tomare" (Japanese: 時間よ、止まれ)	June 24, 1980
370	"Soft Clay"; Transliteration: "Funwari Nendo" (Japanese: ふんわりねんど)	June 25, 1980
371	"Materials Quality Changing Machine"; Transliteration: "Zaishutsu Hen Kan-ki" (Japanese: 材質変かん機)	June 26, 1980
It starts with a baseball thrown into a window. The owner scolded Nobita even though Gian does it, he forces Nobita to admit he did it. He scolded to Doraemon, "why doesn't the owner change the glass to metal?". Doraemon gives Nobita the Materials Quality Changing Machine and he changes many things to another material. Gian took it but requested Doraemon to repair it after accidentally turning his house into a paper house.
372	"Snowless Skiing"; Transliteration: "Yuki no Nai Sukī" (Japanese: 雪のないスキー)	June 27, 1980
373	"Weak Ghosts"; Transliteration: "Yowai Obake" (Japanese: よわいおばけ)	June 30, 1980
The main characters encounter 3 ghosts. Remade as Do your Best! Ghost House in the 2005 series.
374	"Manga Artist"; Transliteration: "Mangaka" (Japanese: まんがか)	July 1, 1980
375	"Substitute Necklace"; Transliteration: "Migawari Pendanto" (Japanese: みがわりペンダント)	July 2, 1980
376	"Combining Glue"; Transliteration: "Gattai Nori" (Japanese: 合体ノリ)	July 3, 1980
377	"Four-Dimensional Cycling"; Transliteration: "Shi-jigen Saikuringu" (Japanese: 四次元サイクリング)	July 4, 1980
378	"Self-made Doll"; Transliteration: "Jidō Ningyō Geki" (Japanese: 自どう人形げき)	July 7, 1980
379	"Haunted Tsuzura"; Transliteration: "Obake Tsuzura" (Japanese: お化けツヅラ)	July 8, 1980
380	"Owl Man, Hero of Justice"; Transliteration: "Fukuroman Sūtsu" (Japanese: フクロマンスーツ)	July 9, 1980
After watching an episode, Nobita still wants to be a superhero, so Doraemon introduces him to the Owl Man Suit. However, while he is trying to do heroic acts, he actually ends up worsening the situation and is perceived to be an anti-hero.
381	"Fanta Glasses"; Transliteration: "Fanta Gurasu" (Japanese: ファンタグラス)	July 10, 1980
382	"The Eyes Have It"; Transliteration: "Teashi Shichi-hon Me ga Santsu" (Japanese: 手足七本目が三つ)	July 11, 1980
383	"Water Striders"; Transliteration: "Amenbō" (Japanese: あめんぼう)	July 14, 1980
384	"The Real Board Game"; Transliteration: "Ningen Sugoroku" (Japanese: 人間すごろく)	July 15, 1980
385	"Heart Cologne"; Transliteration: "Kokoro Koron" (Japanese: ココロコロン)	July 16, 1980
Doraemon uses a potion to find the owner of a lost doll.
386	"Power Screwing Machine"; Transliteration: "In Chikara Nejimage-ki" (Japanese: いん力ねじまげ機)	July 17, 1980
387	"Fashion Virus"; Transliteration: "Ryūkō-sei Nekoshaku Bīrusu" (Japanese: 流行性ネコシャクシビールス)	July 18, 1980
388	"Kurulin Car"; Transliteration: "Kururin Jidōsha" (Japanese: クルリンじどうしゃ)	July 21, 1980
389	"Sturdy"; Transliteration: "Ganjō Gusuri" (Japanese: がんじょうぐすり)	July 22, 1980
390	"The Magnet of Round Things"; Transliteration: "Maruimo no Ji-Ishi" (Japanese: まるいものじ石)	July 23, 1980
391	"The Pain Rebound Mirror"; Transliteration: "Itami Hanekaeri Mirā" (Japanese: いたみはねかえりミラー)	July 24, 1980
392	"Weekly Nobita"; Transliteration: "Shūkan Nobita" (Japanese: 週刊のび太)	July 25, 1980
Nobita uses the Magazine Maker Set to publish his own manga without seeking the Editor Robot for advice.
393	"The Momotaro Jirushi Millet Dumplings"; Transliteration: "Momotarō Jirushi Kibidango" (Japanese: もも太郎印きびだんご)	July 28, 1980
394	"The Good Luck/Bad Luck Duo"; Transliteration: "Fukubin Konbi" (Japanese: ふくびんコンビ)	July 29, 1980
395	"A Candy That Turns into Animals"; Transliteration: "Dōbutsu ni Bakeru Kyandē" (Japanese: 動物に化けるキャンデー)	July 30, 1980
396	"The Crowd-be-Gone Gyro"; Transliteration: "Ninyoke Jairo" (Japanese: 人よけジャイロ)	July 31, 1980
397	"Plant Pen"; Transliteration: "Shokubutsu Pen" (Japanese: 植物ペン)	August 1, 1980
Shizuka likes flowers but Nobita has none. However a magic pen allows flowers or trees drawn on paper to come alive. When Doraemon tries it to make a tree house, he unknowingly uses a bit of paper with an advert for a washing machine on the other side with drastic results.
398	"To Perform in TV with the Touch Camera"; Transliteration: "Tacchi Kamera de Terebi Shutsuen" (Japanese: タッチカメラでテレビ出演)	August 4, 1980
Doraemon answers a mysterious call in which he is told to watch Channel X, so he changes the channel. It turns out to be Suneo on television. Doraemon decides to make Nobita appear on television in any way.
399	"The Wishing Star Fireworks"; Transliteration: "Negai Hoshi Hanabi" (Japanese: ねがい星花火)	August 5, 1980
400	"Creating the Earth"; Transliteration: "Chikyū Seizō Hō" (Japanese: 地球製造法)	August 6, 1980
Gian and Suneo show Nobita their newest models. Nobita takes from Doraemon an Earth Creation Kit to make a mini real earth. Nobita gets Gian and Suneo to witness the formation of the earth. This episode is remade in 1986 as "Earth Creation Kit."
401	"Bottle Cap Collection"; Transliteration: "Ō-kan Korekushon" (Japanese: 王かんコレクション)	August 7, 1980
Nobita wants his bottle cap collection to be noticed so Doraemon uses a gadget to popularize the collecting of bottle caps.
402	"Yacht Adventure"; Transliteration: "Yotto Dai Bōken" (Japanese: ヨット大冒険)	August 8, 1980
S9	"Nessie's Coming!"; Transliteration: "Nesshī ga Kuru!" (Japanese: ネッシーが来る!)	August 8, 1980
403	"O.K Microphone"; Transliteration: "Ōkē Maiku" (Japanese: オーケーマイク)	August 11, 1980
404	"A Magic Glasses"; Transliteration: "Fushigi na Megane" (Japanese: ふしぎなメガネ)	August 12, 1980
405	"Animal Language"; Transliteration: "Dōbutsu-go Heddohon" (Japanese: どうぶつごヘッドホン)	August 13, 1980
406	"Seasons Can"; Transliteration: "Kisetsu Kantsume" (Japanese: きせつカンヅメ)	August 14, 1980
407	"Self Confidence Helmet"; Transliteration: "Jishin Herumetto" (Japanese: 自信ヘルメット)	August 15, 1980
408	"Model Letter Pen"; Transliteration: "Mohan Tegami Pen" (Japanese: もはん手紙ペン)	August 18, 1980
409	"The Proud Nobita"; Transliteration: "Ibari-ya Nobita" (Japanese: いばり屋のび太)	August 19, 1980
410	"The Time Watch"; Transliteration: "Tanma Uocchi" (Japanese: タンマウオッチ)	August 20, 1980
411	"The Emotion Pistol"; Transliteration: "Geramesopun Pisutoru" (Japanese: ゲラメソプンピストル)	August 21, 1980
412	"Delivery Mirror"; Transliteration: "Bunshin Kagami" (Japanese: 分身かがみ)	August 22, 1980
413	"Fighting Machine"; Transliteration: "Kenkamashin" (Japanese: ケンカマシン)	August 25, 1980
414	"Spring Return Button"; Transliteration: "Shun-kan Ritān Batan" (Japanese: しゅん間リターンボタン)	August 26, 1980
415	"The Superlungs"; Transliteration: "Kyōryoku Hai-ponpu Gasu" (Japanese: 強力ハイポンプガス)	August 27, 1980
416	"Down with the Gians!"; Transliteration: "Jaian o Yattsukeru!" (Japanese: ジャイアンをやっつけろ！)	August 28, 1980
417	"Water Cassette"; Transliteration: "Shiawase na Ningyo-hime" (Japanese: しあわせな人魚姫)	August 29, 1980
418	"The Interactive TV"; Transliteration: "Warikomi Bideo de Terebi Shutsuen" (Japanese: わりこみビデオでテレビ出演)	September 1, 1980
419	"Justice Rope"; Transliteration: "Seigi Rōpu" (Japanese: せいぎロープ)	September 2, 1980
Doraemon introduces a vine-like cyborg that punishes people who do wrong things by tying them up.
420	"A Dinosaur Came"; Transliteration: "Kyōryū Gakita" (Japanese: 恐竜がきた)	September 3, 1980
421	"Doraemon the Prankster"; Transliteration: "Itazura Doraemon" (Japanese: いたずらドラえもん)	September 4, 1980
422	"Magnifying Glass"; Transliteration: "Mushi Megane" (Japanese: 虫めがね)	September 5, 1980
423	"Shopping with Leaves"; Transliteration: "Kono Ha de Kaimono" (Japanese: この葉で買物)	September 8, 1980
424	"Transparent Paint"; Transliteration: "Tōmē Penki" (Japanese: 透明ペンキ)	September 9, 1980
425	"Dream Glasses"; Transliteration: "Yume Gurasu" (Japanese: ゆめグラス)	September 10, 1980
Doraemon introduces the Dream Glasses, which help the user find out what others are dreaming about.
426	"Hearted Chocolate"; Transliteration: "Kokoro Choko" (Japanese: ココロチョコ)	September 11, 1980
427	"The Pass Loop"; Transliteration: "Tōrinuke Fūpu" (Japanese: 通りぬけフープ)	September 12, 1980
428	"Enjoying Memories With a Recording Machine"; Transliteration: "Rokuken-ki de Tanoshimō" (Japanese: 録験機で楽しもう)	September 15, 1980
429	"The Cloud of Clay"; Transliteration: "Kumo no Nentsuchi" (Japanese: くものねん土)	September 16, 1980
430	"The Maze Wheel"; Transliteration: "Hōmumeiro" (Japanese: ホームメイロ)	September 17, 1980
431	"Change Opinion Gun"; Transliteration: "Awasēru" (Japanese: アワセール)	September 18, 1980
432	"Which One is Trying to be Troublesome?!"; Transliteration: "Mendō Miru no wa Docchi!?" (Japanese: 面倒みるのはどっち!?)	September 19, 1980
Nobita is doing his Math Test when Doraemon and Dorami interfere by cleaning his room noisily.
433	"Toraemon has Appeared"; Transliteration: "Toraemon Tōjō" (Japanese: トラえもん登場)	September 22, 1980
Nobita's friends have been pranked using gadgets, and they think Doraemon is the culprit. Doraemon discovers it is Toraemon, another robot cat like him who enjoys pranks.
434	"Make a Home Anime"; Transliteration: "Hōmu Anime o Tsukurō" (Japanese: ホームアニメを作ろう)	September 23, 1980
435	"I want to be a dog" Transliteration: "Inu ni Naritai" (Japanese: いぬになりたい)	September 24, 1980
436	"The Water Repellent Rope"; Transliteration: "Mizu Yoke Rōpu" (Japanese: 水よけロープ)	September 25, 1980
Jealous at Suneo for going for a summer holiday and leaving Nobita out, the latter wishes to walk on the sea floor without going into the ocean. Doraemon takes him there and they use Water Repellent Ropes to do so. Remade as How to Walk on the Sea Floor Without Getting in the Ocean in the 2005 series.
437	"Animal Set"; Transliteration: "Dōbutsu Setto" (Japanese: 動物セット)	September 26, 1980
438	"Who is the Rain Man!?"; Transliteration: "Ame Otoko wa Dare da!?" (Japanese: 雨男はだれだ!?)	September 29, 1980
439	"Ultra Ring"; Transliteration: "Urutora Ringu" (Japanese: ウルトラリング)	September 30, 1980
Nobita misplaces his mother's ring and gets her to wear Doraemon's gadget Ultra Ring. Her strength suddenly gets out of hand.
440	"Mysterious Crayon"; Transliteration: "Fushikina Kureyon" (Japanese: ふしぎなクレヨン)	October 1, 1980
441	"Nobita's Land of Chamberlain"; Transliteration: "Chanbara no Nobita Rando" (Japanese: チャンバラのび太ランド)	October 2, 1980
442	"The Psychic Mic"; Transliteration: "Nen Roku Maiku" (Japanese: 念録マイク)	October 6, 1980
443	"The Automatic Cashier of Compensation"; Transliteration: "Isha-ryō Shiharai-ki" (Japanese: イシャ料しはらい機)	October 7, 1980
444	"Fashionable Camera"; Transliteration: "Oshare Kamera" (Japanese: おしゃれカメラ)	October 8, 1980
445	"Anything Tap"; Transliteration: "Nan demo Jaguchi" (Japanese: なんでも蛇口)	October 9, 1980
446	"The Slope Switch"; Transliteration: "Sakamichi Rebā" (Japanese: さかみちレバー)	October 13, 1980
447	"Refreshing Summer at the Mini-House"; Transliteration: "Mini Hausu de Sawayakana Natsu" (Japanese: ミニハウスでさわやかな夏)	October 14, 1980
448	"Your Eyes Have One Million Volts"; Transliteration: "Kimi no Hitomi wa 100-man Boruto" (Japanese: きみのひとみは100万ボルト)	October 15, 1980
Doraemeon provides a magic eye which, when Nobita blinks his eyes twice, causes anyone looking at him to fall in love with him. He goes to look for Shizuka. On his way, Nobita meets Gian and Suneo who he accidentally blinks his eyes at.
449	"The Be-There Phone"; Transliteration: "Oshikake Denwa" (Japanese: おしかけ電話)	October 16, 1980
450	"Speed-Adjusting Watch"; Transliteration: "Ato ga Kowai" (Japanese: あとがこわい！)	October 17, 1980
451	"Special Bonsai"; Transliteration: "Fuēru ue Kibachi" (Japanese: フエールうえ木ばち)	October 21, 1980
Doraemon and Nobita fight over one cake, and Doraemon decides to plant the cake into the soil of Special Bonsai and waters it. The plant grows and bears fruits that contain cakes.
452	"Nose Balloons"; Transliteration: "Hana Barūn" (Japanese: はなバルーン)	October 22, 1980
Gian starts a contest to see who can blow the biggest bubble, and the first one who fails will get beat up. Nobita explains the situation to Doraemon, who gives him the Nose Balloons. Remade as Floating Through the Sky with Nose Balloons in the 2005 series.
453	"Dream Pillow"; Transliteration: "Yume Makura" (Japanese: ゆめまくら)	October 23, 1980
454	"Instant Object Mobile"; Transliteration: "Buttai Shun-Kan I Dōki" (Japanese: 物体しゅん間い動機)	October 27, 1980
Gian has stolen the manga and toys of the neighborhood children again, including Nobita's and Suneo's. Doraemon teleports Nobita home with the Instant Object Mobile. Nobita uses the machine to take everything from Gian's room.
455	"Invisibility Eye Drop"; Transliteration: "Tōme Ningen Megusuri" (Japanese: とう明人間目ぐすり)	October 28, 1980
On a day that Doraemon goes to the future to attend a dorayaki convention, Nobita uses a gadget to become invisible and steal Suneo's book back from Gian.
456	"Doraemon's Bell Disappeared"; Transliteration: "Doraemon no Suzu Sō Dō" (Japanese: ドラえもんの鈴そうどう)	October 29, 1980
Doraemon has lost his bell and he gets Nobita to help find it.
457	"Happy-Go-Lucky Soap"; Transliteration: "Fukuwarai Ishiken" (Japanese: 福笑い石けん)	October 30, 1980
458	"The Get Started Pistol"; Transliteration: "Suguyaru Gan" (Japanese: すぐやるガン)	November 3, 1980
459	"House Feeling Converter"; Transliteration: "Ie no Kanji Hen Kan-ki" (Japanese: 家の感じ変かん器)	November 4, 1980
460	"My Guardian Paper"; Transliteration: "Mamori Kami" (Japanese: まもり紙)	November 5, 1980
461	"Entirely Crayon"; Transliteration: "Sokkuri Kureyon" (Japanese: そっくりクレヨン)	November 6, 1980
462	"Forced Savings Box"; Transliteration: "Muriyari Chokin-bako" (Japanese: むりやり貯金ばこ)	November 10, 1980
463	"Who wants a puppy?" Transliteration: "Nozomiru Jū" (Japanese: ノゾミルじゅう)	November 11, 1980
464	"Playing In An Iceberg"; Transliteration: "Kyodai Ryūhyō se Asobō" (Japanese: 巨大流氷で遊ぼう)	November 12, 1980
465	"Sorcery Watch"; Transliteration: "Mahō no Tokei" (Japanese: まほうのとけい)	November 13, 1980
466	"A Graph that Never Lies"; Transliteration: "Gurafu wa Uso o Tsukanai" (Japanese: グラフはウソをつかない)	November 17, 1980
467	"The Happiness Gas"; Transliteration: "Hesorin Sutando" (Japanese: ヘソリンスタンド)	November 18, 1980
468	"The Popular Guise Badge"; Transliteration: "Misekake Motemote Bajji" (Japanese: みせかけモテモテバッジ)	November 19, 1980
469	"The Spy Satellites"; Transliteration: "Supai Eisei" (Japanese: スパイ衛星)	November 20, 1980
470	"Robot Clothing"; Transliteration: "Robotto-fuku" (Japanese: ロボットふく)	November 24, 1980
471	"Melody Gas"; Transliteration: "Merodī Gasu" (Japanese: メロディーガス)	November 25, 1980
472	"The Move Mimicker"; Transliteration: "Omekon" (Japanese: まねコン)	November 26, 1980
473	"Doraemon's Girlfriend"; Transliteration: "Doraemon no Gārufurendo" (Japanese: ドラえもんのガールフレンド)	November 27, 1980
474	"Mini Aquarium"; Transliteration: "Mini Suizoku-kan" (Japanese: ミニ水族館)	December 1, 1980
475	"Rebuild the Battered Inn"; Transliteration: "Onboro Ryokan o Tatenaose" (Japanese: オンボロ旅館をたてなおせ)	December 2, 1980
476	"Test Robot"; Transliteration: "Tesuto・Robotto" (Japanese: テスト・ロボット)	December 3, 1980
477	"Feudal Lord Coming"; Transliteration: "Tono-sama ga Kita" (Japanese: とのさまがきた)	December 4, 1980
Doraemon and Nobita are on a mission to save an innocent peasant from a cruel feudal lord of Ancient Japan, while the lord himself is having a shocking time in the 20th century. Later remade as "Feudal Lord of the 20th Century," and both would be remade as Feudal Lord of the 21st Century in the 2005 series.
478	"The Foldable House"; Transliteration: "Oritatami Hausu" (Japanese: おりたたみハウス)	December 8, 1980
479	"The Seed to Feel Cheerful"; Transliteration: "Sono Ki ni Naru Mi" (Japanese: その気になる実)	December 9, 1980
480	"Momotaro Jirushi's Millet Dumplings"; Transliteration: "Momotarō no Kibidango" (Japanese: ももたろうのきびだんご)	December 10, 1980
481	"I'm an Esper!"; Transliteration: "Boku wa Esupā da!" (Japanese: ぼくはエスパーだ！)	December 11, 1980
After Suneo ridicules Nobita, Doraemon and Nobita get back at him by tricking him into believing that he gained telekinetic abilities, and then humiliating him in front of the audience he performs to. Remade as Esper Suneo in the 2005 series.
482	"The Space Exploration Sugoroku"; Transliteration: "Uchū Tanken Suguroku" (Japanese: 宇宙たんけんすごろく)	December 15, 1980
Nobita invites Shizuka, Gian and Suneo to his house and play a futuristic sugoroku game set in space. Nobita and Shizuka eventually complete the game, but Gian and Suneo are lagging behind and get stuck inside the game.
483	"The Worldwide Flood"; Transliteration: "Sekai Chinbotsu" (Japanese: 世界沈没)	December 16, 1980
Doraemon and Nobita use a pair of eyeballs that allows the wearer to see into the near future, and see their town being flooded. They decide to build a boat and wait for the flood to happen at midnight.
484	"A Mirror that Guesses Thoughts"; Transliteration: "Kokoro no Zoki Mirā" (Japanese: こころのぞきミラー)	December 17, 1980
485	"The Horrors of Gian's Birthday"; Transliteration: "Jaian no Tanjōbi" (Japanese: ジャイアンのたん生日)	December 18, 1980
It is Gian's birthday, but Nobita and friends want to escape, as they fear Gian will do the same things as he did in previous parties like eating the entire birthday cake, singing a dreadful song, and threatening them if he feels they are not sincere in wishing him well. Doraemon make matters worse by giving him a gadget to force them to attend.
486	"Day Changing Calendar"; Transliteration: "Nichizuke Henkō Karendā" (Japanese: 日づけ変更カレンダー)	December 22, 1980
Nobita is sad that Christmas is not coming. Doraemon gives him a gadget that can change the date of this calendar.
487	"Nobita and Doraemon's Christmas (part 1)"; Transliteration: "Dora to Nobita no Kurisumasu! (Mae)" (Japanese: ドラとのび太のクリスマス！（前）)	December 23, 1980
488	"Nobita and Doraemon's Christmas (part 2)"; Transliteration: "Dora to Nobita no Kurisumasu (Ato)" (Japanese: ドラとのび太のクリスマス！（後）)	December 24, 1980
489	"Mini Santa"; Transliteration: "Mini Santa" (Japanese: ミニサンタ)	December 25, 1980
490	"A Snowstorm Machine"; Transliteration: "Yuki Furashi" (Japanese: ゆきふらし)	December 29, 1980
491	"A Real Dream"; Transliteration: "Honmo no Yume" (Japanese: ほんもの夢)	December 30, 1980

== 1981 ==
No.	Title	Original release date
S10	"Star Wars in My Attic"; Transliteration: "Tenjō Ura no Uchū Sensō" (Japanese: 天井うらの宇宙戦争)	January 1, 1981
Nobita and company use a device to shrink down and rescue a pint sized princess who is held captive by a species of tiny aliens.
S11	"The Sprite Summoner"; Transliteration: "Seirei Yobidashi Udewa" (Japanese: 精霊よびだしうでわ)	January 2, 1981
S12	"Come Back, Doraemon"; Transliteration: "Kaettekita Doraemon" (Japanese: 帰ってきたドラえもん)	January 3, 1981
Doraemon tells Nobita that he must return to the 22nd century, and won't be returning.
492	"Sunrise Set"; Transliteration: "Hatushinode Setto" (Japanese: 初日の出セット)	January 5, 1981
493	"The New Year's Party in the Wallpaper"; Transliteration: "Kabe no Naka de Shinnenkai" (Japanese: かべの中で新年会)	January 6, 1981
The class selects Nobita for their New Year's party, but his mom will not allow it. Doraemon and Nobita work out a plan to hold the party without being discovered, by having it held in Doraemon's wallpapers.
494	"Anytime Diary"; Transliteration: "Itsudemo Nikki" (Japanese: いつでも日記)	January 7, 1981
495	"Ghost Phone"; Transliteration: "Denwa no Obake" (Japanese: 電話のおばけ)	January 8, 1981
496	"Somersault Food"; Transliteration: "Kinto Fūdo" (Japanese: きんとフード)	January 12, 1981
Nobita learns some very important lessons in cloud riding. Remade as Riding a Cloud to School in the 2005 series.
497	"Others Dream"; Transliteration: "Tanin no Yume o Miru" (Japanese: 他人の夢を見る)	January 13, 1981
498	"A La Carte"; Transliteration: "A・Ra・Karute" (Japanese: ア・ラ・カルテ)	January 14, 1981
499	"Reflect With the Comparison TV"; Transliteration: "「Haiyaku Irekae Bideo」de Hansei!" (Japanese: 「配役いれかえビデオ」で反省！)	January 15, 1981
Tame enrolls in Nobita's school as a transfer student. His test scores are worse than Nobita's and Nobita wins the footrace against him. But when Nobita realizes his overconfidence may hurt Tame, he must do something before Tame ends up beaten by Gian and Suneo. Remade as Someone Who's an Even Bigger Failure in Life Than Me Showed Up in the 2005 series.
500	"Room Swimmer"; Transliteration: "Rūmu Suimā" (Japanese: ルームスイマー)	January 19, 1981
501	"Exchanging Doing Things Machine"; Transliteration: "Gokiburi Kabā" (Japanese: ゴキブリカバー)	January 20, 1981
It starts in a night when Doraemon rushes back to Nobita's house.
502	"The Projector"; Transliteration: "Honmo no Gentōki" (Japanese: ほんものげんとうき)	January 21, 1981
503	"The Cheerleader Gloves"; Transliteration: "Chiagāru Tebukuro" (Japanese: チアガール手ぶくろ)	January 22, 1981
504	"The Suit for Scuba Diving on Land"; Transliteration: "Sen-chi Fuku" (Japanese: せん地服)	January 26, 1981
505	"The Good Luck Pills"; Transliteration: "Ayakarin" (Japanese: アヤカリン)	January 27, 1981
506	"The Painting Valuing Machine"; Transliteration: "Meiga Shirabe-ki" (Japanese: 名画しらべ機)	January 28, 1981
507	"The Future Camera"; Transliteration: "Yukusue Kamera" (Japanese: ユクスエカメラ)	January 29, 1981
508	"Nobita's Underground Country (part 1)"; Transliteration: "Nobita no Chitei Ōkoku (Mae)" (Japanese: のび太の地底王国（前）)	February 2, 1981
Nobita, Doraemon and Dekisugi transform a hole in the ground into a magical, beautiful world just for kids.
509	"Nobita's Underground Country (part 2)"; Transliteration: "Nobita no Chitei Ōkoku (Ato)" (Japanese: のび太の地底王国（後）)	February 3, 1981
510	"Let's Make Badges"; Transliteration: "Bajji o Tsukurou" (Japanese: バッジを作ろう)	February 4, 1981
Nobita and Doraemon use the Badge Making Camera to make badges so they will have more badges than Suneo.
511	"The Instant Jungle"; Transliteration: "Sokuseki Janguru" (Japanese: 即席ジャングル)	February 5, 1981
512	"The Time Machine is Lost! (part 1)"; Transliteration: "Taimu Mashin ga Nakunatte! (Mae)" (Japanese: タイムマシンがなくなった！（前）)	February 9, 1981
Nobita accidentally caused Doraemon's time machine to go missing.
513	"The Time Machine is Lost! (part 2)"; Transliteration: "Taimu Mashin ga Nakunatte! (Ato)" (Japanese: タイムマシンがなくなった！（後）)	February 10, 1981
514	"The Restore Ray"; Transliteration: "Urameshi-ya Fukugen Kōsen" (Japanese: うらめしや復元光線)	February 11, 1981
515	"Big Problem With the X-Ray Stickers"; Transliteration: "Tōshi Shīru de Dai Pinchi" (Japanese: 透視シールで大ピンチ)	February 12, 1981
When Nobita uses an X-Ray Sticker on Dekisugi's notebooks to copy his homework, he accidentally views an exchange between him and Shizuka where they criticize Nobita's dependency on Shizuka. Infuriated, Nobita writes some insulting things on the monitor which end up on the actual notebook and now he has to find a way to erase the text before Shizuka and Dekisugi see it. Remade as "X-Ray Stickers" in 2004.
516	"The All-In-One Appliance"; Transliteration: "Okonomi Bokkusu" (Japanese: おこのみボックス)	February 16, 1981
517	"Nobita Becomes a Gunman! (part 1)"; Transliteration: "Nobita・Ganman ni Naru! (Mae)" (Japanese: のび太・ガンマンになる！（前）)	February 17, 1981
518	"Nobita Becomes a Gunman! (part 2)"; Transliteration: "Nobita・Ganman ni Naru! (Ato)" (Japanese: のび太・ガンマンになる！（後）)	February 18, 1981
519	"The Equality Bomb"; Transliteration: "Byōdō Bakudan" (Japanese: ビョードー爆弾)	February 19, 1981
520	"The Partitioning Hammer"; Transliteration: "Bunshin Hanmā" (Japanese: 分しんハンマー)	February 23, 1981
521	"1024 Times Bonus"; Transliteration: "Bōnasu 1024-bai" (Japanese: ボーナス1024倍)	February 24, 1981
522	"Go to Dandelion Sky"; Transliteration: "Tanpopo Kushi" (Japanese: たんぽぽくし)	February 25, 1981
523	"Is It Alright To Become A Mom?"; Transliteration: "Mamatteīna?" (Japanese: ママっていいな？)	February 26, 1981
524	"The Rescue"; Transliteration: "Sōnan Kyūjo" (Japanese: 遭難救助)	March 2, 1981
525	"Let's Make An Aquarium!"; Transliteration: "Mizuzoku-kan o Tsukure!" (Japanese: 水ぞくかんをつくれ！)	March 3, 1981
526	"The Hot Spring Rope"; Transliteration: "Onsen Rōpu" (Japanese: 温泉ロープ)	March 4, 1981
527	"There's a Panic Happened!"; Transliteration: "Panikku ga Okita" (Japanese: パニックがおきた)	March 5, 1981
528	"The Irritated Paper"; Transliteration: "Kanshaku Kami" (Japanese: かんしゃく紙)	March 9, 1981
529	"Help the Stray Dogs!! (part 1)"; Transliteration: "Nora Inu-tachi o Sukue!! (Mae)" (Japanese: のらイヌたちを救え!!（前）)	March 10, 1981
530	"Help the Stray Dogs!! (part 2)"; Transliteration: "Nora Inu-tachi o Sukue!! (Ato)" (Japanese: のらイヌたちを救え!!（後）)	March 11, 1981
531	"The Grown-Up Scolding Pass"; Transliteration: "Otona o Shikaru Wanshō" (Japanese: 大人をしかる腕章)	March 12, 1981
532	"The Duty Exchange"; Transliteration: "Suru koto Irekae-ki" (Japanese: することいれかえき)	March 16, 1981
533	"Story Mixer"; Transliteration: "Sutōrī Mikisā" (Japanese: ストーリーミキサー)	March 17, 1981
534	"Eating Habits"; Transliteration: "Tabe Aru-ki" (Japanese: 食べある機)	March 18, 1981
535	"Owner Sticker"; Transliteration: "Mochinushi Shīru" (Japanese: もちぬしシール)	March 19, 1981
536	"How to Enjoy Gian's Recital"; Transliteration: "Jaian Risaitaru o Tanoshīmu Hōhō" (Japanese: ジャイアンリサイタルを楽しむ方法)	March 23, 1981
537	"The Charter Telephone"; Transliteration: "Kashikiri Denwa" (Japanese: 貸し切り電話)	March 24, 1981
538	"The Magic Belly"; Transliteration: "Majikku Onaka" (Japanese: マジックおなか)	March 25, 1981
539	"The Super Racket"; Transliteration: "Sūpā Raketto" (Japanese: スーパーラケット)	March 26, 1981
540	"The Gamechanger Camera"; Transliteration: "Kachi-kachi Kamera" (Japanese: カチカチカメラ)	March 30, 1981
541	"Nobita Man"; Transliteration: "Nobitaman" (Japanese: ノビタマン)	March 31, 1981
542	"Fascinating Earplugs"; Transliteration: "Uttori Iyahon" (Japanese: うっとりイヤホン)	April 1, 1981
S13	"The Mystery of Yamaoku Village"; Transliteration: "Yamaoku-mura no Kai Jiken" (Japanese: 山おく村の怪事件)	April 1, 1981
S14	"Moa, The Dodo, Forever"; Transliteration: "Moa yo Dōdō yo Eien ni" (Japanese: モアよドードーよ永遠に)	April 1, 1981
543	"The Wakey Waker"; Transliteration: "Okite Teyokatta" (Japanese: オキテテヨカッタ)	April 6, 1981
544	"The Jaws of the Open Lot"; Transliteration: "Sakanatsuri" (Japanese: さかなつり)	April 7, 1981
545	"Nobita the Weakling"; Transliteration: "Yowamushi Nobita" (Japanese: 弱虫のび太)	April 8, 1981
546	"The Long-Distance Mirror"; Transliteration: "Utsushippanashi Mirā" (Japanese: うつしっぱなしミラー)	April 13, 1981
547	"Let's Assemble a Handmade Robot (Part 1)"; Transliteration: "Kyodai Robotto o Kumitateyou (Mae)" (Japanese: 巨大ロボットを組み立てよう（前）)	April 14, 1981
Suneo shows Nobita and Gian a new robot he has built. Nobita begs Doraemon to build one for him, so the latter takes out the Titanic Robo Giant Series for them to build. Remade as Our Homemade Giant Robot Loses Control in the 2005 series.
548	"Let's Assemble a Handmade Robot (Part 2)"; Transliteration: "Kyodai Robotto o Kumitateyou (Ato)" (Japanese: 巨大ロボットを組み立てよう（後）)	April 15, 1981
As soon as the robot is finally assembled, Nobita flies it to suppress Suneo's robot before flying it back to the countryside. They meet countryside children who live in the village on the other side of the mountain.
549	"Mysterious Automobile"; Transliteration: "Fushigi Najidōsha" (Japanese: ふしぎなじどうしゃ)	April 20, 1981
550	"The Statics Suit"; Transliteration: "Chiku-den Sūtsu" (Japanese: ちく電スーツ)	April 21, 1981
551	"The Lucky Beans"; Transliteration: "Fuku wa Uchi no Mame" (Japanese: 福はうちの豆)	April 22, 1981
552	"The Balancing Needle"; Transliteration: "Baransu Chūsha" (Japanese: バランスちゅうしゃ)	April 27, 1981
After Nobita experiences four unfortunate events, Doraemon pricks him with the Balancing Needle so four good things will occur to him. However, he must refuse any good things offered to him or else something bad will happen.
553	"Doraemon vs. Doraemon"; Transliteration: "Doraemon tai Doraemon" (Japanese: ドラえもん対ドラえもん)	April 28, 1981
Doraemon is tasked to help Nobita's Mom with her shopping using his own shadow, but Doraemon and Nobita have to bind the shadow back before the former gets replaced by the shadow.
554	"Nobita Disappeared?"; Transliteration: "Nobita ga Kie Chau!?" (Japanese: のび太が消えちゃう!?)	April 29, 1981
555	"The Obedient Robot Star!~"; Transliteration: "Sunao na Robotto Hoshi~i!" (Japanese: すなおなロボットがほし～い!)	May 4, 1981
556	"Look-alike Balloon"; Transliteration: "Ayatsuri Sokkuri Fūsen" (Japanese: あやつりそっくりふうせん)	May 5, 1981
Nobita creates a balloon replica of himself and sends it out. Nobita sees his replica through a mirror. Unaware of the fact that Shizuka is present there, he unzips his pants to urinate.
557	"The Finishing Wave"; Transliteration: "Kansei Uēbu" (Japanese: かんせいウェーブ)	May 6, 1981
558	"Nobita's Black Hole"; Transliteration: "Nobita no Burakku Hōru" (Japanese: のび太のブラックホール)	May 11, 1981
Nobita uses Doraemon's Mini Black Hole gadget to defeat Gian in an eating competition. But when he returns home to take a nap, he unknowingly swallows everything in his room.
559	"Suneo and the Earthquake Catfish!"; Transliteration: "「Jishin Namazu」de Suneotto ni Gyaku Shū!" (Japanese: 「地震なまず」でスネ夫に逆しゅう！)	May 12, 1981
560	"Endangered Animal Spray"; Transliteration: "Kokusaihogo Dōbutsu Supur" (Japanese: 国際保護動物スプレー)	May 13, 1981
561	"Moving with the Moving Map"; Transliteration: "Hikkoshi Chizu" (Japanese: ひっこし地図)	May 18, 1981
562	"The Forest is Alive"; Transliteration: "Mori wa Ikite iru" (Japanese: 森は生きている)	May 19, 1981
Doraemon uses the Heart of Soil to bring life to a forest.
563	"Course Determiner"; Transliteration: "Kōsu Kettei-ki" (Japanese: コース決定機)	May 20, 1981
564	"The Disaster Detector"; Transliteration: "Sainan Yohō-ki" (Japanese: 災難予報機)	May 25, 1981
565	"Human Camera Shutter"; Transliteration: "Ningen Kamera Shattā" (Japanese: 人間カメラシャッター)	May 26, 1981
566	"What Kind of Girl Do You Wanna Communicate With?"; Transliteration: "Buntsū Aite wa Donna Ko...?" (Japanese: 文通相手はどんな子...？)	May 27, 1981
567	"Calling Necklace"; Transliteration: "Yondara Kubiwa" (Japanese: ヨンダラ首わ)	June 1, 1981
568	"Replacement Mirror"; Transliteration: "Torikae Mirā" (Japanese: とりかえミラー)	June 2, 1981
569	"Occupation Testing Armband"; Transliteration: "Shokugyō Tesuto Wanshō" (Japanese: 職業テスト腕章)	June 3, 1981
570	"Yen Pit"; Transliteration: "En Pitsu" (Japanese: 円ピツ)	June 8, 1981
Doraemon gives Nobita the Money Pencil which can purchase anything by writing a number on the paper. But Nobita buys too many items and ends up receiving a number of job tasks, and Doraemon suffers as a result. Remade as Rich As A Yen Pit in the 2005 series.
571	"Prohibition Sign"; Transliteration: "Kinshi Hyōshiki" (Japanese: キンシひょうしき)	June 9, 1981
Doraemon introduces the Prohibition Sign. After one writes a banning rule in the blank place, people can't break the ban. Remade as You Can't Do That! Prohibition Sign in the 2005 series.
572	"The Puddle Spray"; Transliteration: "Donbura Gasu" (Japanese: ドンブラガス)	June 10, 1981
573	"The Devil Card"; Transliteration: "Debiru Kādo" (Japanese: デビルカード)	June 15, 1981
574	"A World Without Mirrors"; Transliteration: "Kagami no Nai Sekai" (Japanese: かがみのない世界)	June 16, 1981
Nobita wonders what the world would be like if mirrors didn't exist, so he and Doraemon use the What-If Phone Booth to eliminate mirrors from the world.
575	"The Birth of Nobita Kingdom"; Transliteration: "Nobita Ōkoku Tanjō" (Japanese: のび太王国誕生)	June 17, 1981
576	"Goodbye, Shizuka"; Transliteration: "Shizuka-chan Sayōnara" (Japanese: しずかちゃんさようなら)	June 22, 1981
After getting scolded by his teacher again, Nobita decides to cut all ties with Shizuka so that she can have a good future using whatever means necessary. Remade in 1986 as "Nobita's Tough Decision."
577	"Nobita became a Poster"; Transliteration: "Posutā ni Natta Nobita" (Japanese: ポスターになったのび太)	June 23, 1981
578	"Take a Break With a Good Sleeper"; Transliteration: "Gussuri Makura de Hitoyatsumi" (Japanese: グッスリまくらでひと休み)	June 24, 1981
579	"Save the Balloon"; Transliteration: "Kikyū o Sukue" (Japanese: 気球を救え)	June 29, 1981
580	"The Robot-Control-Training Machine"; Transliteration: "Sō-jū Kunren-ki" (Japanese: そうじゅうくんれんき)	June 30, 1981
581	"The Ovator Flashlight"; Transliteration: "Tamago Umasetō" (Japanese: たまごうませとう)	July 1, 1981
582	"The "Truth Banner" is Always Correct"; Transliteration: "「Shinjutsu no Hatajirushi」wa Subete Tadashī" (Japanese: 「真実の旗印」はすべて正しい)	July 6, 1981
583	"Photo-Injection Scope"; Transliteration: "Shashin Hairikomi Sukōpu" (Japanese: しゃしんはいりこみスコープ)	July 7, 1981
584	"The Joining Incense"; Transliteration: "Nakama Irisenkō" (Japanese: なかま入りせんこう)	July 8, 1981
585	"Now-Now Stick"; Transliteration: "Māmābo" (Japanese: まあまあ棒)	July 13, 1981
Doraemon decides to help Nobita by bringing out a gadget which has the ability to calm down an angry person.
586	"Nobita's 100 point test" Transliteration: "Nobita no 100-ten Pīāru" (Japanese: のび太の100点ピーアール)	July 14, 1981
587	"Telekinetic Eye Drops"; Transliteration: "Nen Chikara Me Gusuri" (Japanese: ねん力目ぐすり)	July 15, 1981
588	"Mama Asked For Three Thousand Kilometers"; Transliteration: "Mama o Tazunete San-sen-kiro Gusuri" (Japanese: ママをたずねて三千キロぐすり)	July 20, 1981
589	"The Road Ray"; Transliteration: "Dōrokōsen" (Japanese: 道路光線)	July 21, 1981
590	"Peace Antenna"; Transliteration: "Heiwa Antena" (Japanese: 平和アンテナ)	July 22, 1981
Nobita uses Doraemon's Peace Antenna to make peace between people, but the same gadget causes their favorite anime program to end its run.
591	"The Snowman's Part-time Job"; Transliteration: "Yukiotoko no Arubaito" (Japanese: 雪男のアルバイト)	July 27, 1981
592	"The Clay of Bodybuilding"; Transliteration: "Karada Nendo" (Japanese: からだねん土)	July 28, 1981
593	"The Mall Mallet"; Transliteration: "Uchi de no Depāto" (Japanese: うちでのデパート)	July 29, 1981
594	"Nobita Runs Away From Home for a Long Time"; Transliteration: "Nobita no Naga〜i Iede" (Japanese: のび太のなが〜い家出)	August 3, 1981
After a serious argument between Nobita and Tamako, the former decides to run away from home.
595	"A Dinosaur Is Here!! (Part 1)"; Transliteration: "Kyōryū ga Deta!! (Mae)" (Japanese: 恐竜が出た！！（前）)	August 4, 1981
When live dinosaurs appear outside of town, Doraemon and Nobita go back a few days ago to solve the mystery of how they got there in the first place.
596	"A Dinosaur Is Here!! (Part 2)"; Transliteration: "Kyōryū ga Deta!! (Ato)" (Japanese: 恐竜が出た！！（後）)	August 5, 1981
597	"The Fire Prevention Alarm"; Transliteration: "Kasai Yotei Hōchi Beru" (Japanese: 火災予定報知ベル)	August 10, 1981
598	"Let's Play with Shadow Light"; Transliteration: "Kagee Raito de Asobou" (Japanese: 影絵ライトで遊ぼう)	August 11, 1981
599	"Weight Manipulating Light"; Transliteration: "Omokaru-dou" (Japanese: おもかるとう)	August 12, 1981
Doraemon introduces a flashlight gadget that can manipulate the weight of an object by making it lighter, or heavier.
600	"Norigiri Scope"; Transliteration: "Nobichijimi Sukōpu" (Japanese: のびちぢみスコープ)	August 17, 1981
601	"Cloudwalking"; Transliteration: "Kumo no Naka no Sanpo" (Japanese: 雲の中の散歩)	August 18, 1981
602	"The Gourmet Table Cloth"; Transliteration: "Gurume Tēburu Kake" (Japanese: グルメテーブルかけ)	August 19, 1981
603	"The Saio Horse"; Transliteration: "Saiō Uma" (Japanese: サイオー馬)	August 24, 1981
Remade as The Saio Horse is Kicking Me! in the 2005 series.
604	"Time Floodgate"; Transliteration: "Jimon" (Japanese: 時門)	August 25, 1981
605	"Feeling Warm and Cozy"; Transliteration: "Okoreba atta ka Hokkahoka" (Japanese: おこればあったかホッカホカ)	August 26, 1981
606	"The Pump Amplifier"; Transliteration: "Hirobiro Ponpu" (Japanese: ひろびろポンプ)	August 31, 1981
607	"Medicine Making Machine"; Transliteration: "Kusuri Seizō-ki" (Japanese: くすり製造機)	September 1, 1981
608	"Aerial Hook"; Transliteration: "Kūchū Fukku" (Japanese: 空中フック)	September 2, 1981
609	"Patroller Skaters and Baton"; Transliteration: "Patorōrā Sukēto to Keibō" (Japanese: パトローラースケートとけいぼう)	September 7, 1981
610	"The Mecha Maker"; Transliteration: "Meka Mēkā" (Japanese: メカメーカー)	September 8, 1981
Nobita is planning to make a powerful spacecraft so Doraemon lends him a Mecha Maker to make one. They show off Nobita's spaceship to Shizuka, Gian and Suneo. Gian and Suneo bribe Doraemon with dorayaki for the gadget.
611	"Personal Video"; Transliteration: "Hon'nin Bideo" (Japanese: 本人ビデオ)	September 9, 1981
612	"Six Sided Camera"; Transliteration: "Rokumen Kamera" (Japanese: 六面カメラ)	September 14, 1981
613	"Gian's Feeling Down"; Transliteration: "Gunnyari Jaian" (Japanese: グンニャリジャイアン)	September 15, 1981
When Gian fails to get his secret crush, Doraemon and Nobita help him.
614	"Big Tincture"; Transliteration: "Deka Chinki" (Japanese: デカチンキ)	September 16, 1981
615	"Quiet Ball"; Transliteration: "Shizumi Dama" (Japanese: しずみ玉)	September 21, 1981
616	"What If You're Rich"; Transliteration: "Moshi mo Bokkusu de Okanemochi" (Japanese: もしもボックスでお金持ち)	September 22, 1981
617	"Shelter Tree"; Transliteration: "Yadori-ki" (Japanese: やどり木)	September 23, 1981
618	"I Hate Doraemon!?"; Transliteration: "Doraemon Daikirai!?" (Japanese: ドラえもんだいきらい!?)	October 2, 1981
After monitoring Nobita and Doraemon having a huge fight, Sewashi sends Dorami to help Nobita out, which causes Doraemon to feel left out. Remade in 2005 as "Goodbye, Nobita! Doraemon, Goes Back To The Future."
619	"Let's get on the Insects"; Transliteration: "Konchū Hikōki ni Norou" (Japanese: 昆虫ヒコーキに乗ろう)	October 2, 1981
620	"Invited Tablets for Dinosaurs"; Transliteration: "Kyōryū-tachi ni 「Shōtai-jō」o" (Japanese: 恐竜たちに「招待錠」を)	October 9, 1981
621	"Nobita's Underlying Civilization Theory"; Transliteration: "Nobita no Chitei Bunmei-setsu" (Japanese: のび太の地底文明説)	October 9, 1981
622	"Nobita Broadcasting Association"; Transliteration: "Nobita Hōsō Kyōkai" (Japanese: のび太放送協会)	October 16, 1981
623	"Nobita's Wedding?!"; Transliteration: "Nobita no Kekkonshiki?!" (Japanese: のび太の結婚式?!)	October 16, 1981
After misunderstanding a scenario where Shizuka and Dekisugi are reenacting the proposal scene from Snow White, Nobita and Doraemon travel to future to see the events of Nobita's wedding.
624	"Magical Girl Shizu-chan"; Transliteration: "Majokko Shizuka-chan" (Japanese: 魔女っ子しずかちゃん)	October 23, 1981
Shizuka wishes to be a magical girl for one day, so Doraemon gives her some gadgets which enable to become one. However, she ends up coming home late and gets locked out of the house. Remade as "Magical Witch Shizuka-chan" in 2005 in the same series, and again in the 2005 remake.
625	"Gulliver's Expedition"; Transliteration: "Urayama no Garibā Tanken" (Japanese: 裏山のガリバー探検)	October 23, 1981
Nobita's plane meets with an accident while flying and crashes into the jungle. Doraemon, Gian, Suneo and Shizuka go in search of Nobita. After facing a lot of difficulties they succeed in finding Nobita.
626	"Changing Newspaper Post"; Transliteration: "Shinbun Hizuke Henkō Posuto" (Japanese: 新聞日付変更ポスト)	October 30, 1981
Nobita wishes to the read news every morning. Doraemon gives him a gadget where he could print the newspaper by changing the date. Nobita misuses the gadget but at the end saves the neighbour's house from robbery.
627	"The Good Ol' Days"; Transliteration: "Mukashi wa Yokotta!?" (Japanese: 昔はよかった!?)	October 30, 1981
628	"God Robot"; Transliteration: "Kami-sama Robotto" (Japanese: 神さまロボット)	November 6, 1981
Doraemon gives Nobita a robot God that would fulfill any three wishes. Doraemon and Nobita meet Shizuka and help her fulfill her wish with the help of the gadget. Remade as God Robot Extends His Hand of Love! in the 2005 series.
629	"Nobita's Space Shuttle"; Transliteration: "Nobita no Supēsu Shatoru" (Japanese: のび太のスペースシャトル)	November 6, 1981
Doraemon gives Nobita a rocket straw that he could use to fly. Nobita and his friends create a spaceship with the help of these straws. But Later, Gian and Suneo hijack the spaceship and crash it.
630	"Trouble with Dad's Salary"; Transliteration: "Papa no Gekkyū Sōdō" (Japanese: パパの月給騒動)	November 13, 1981
Tamako prepares a delicious meal for Nobisuke, but he reaches home late. Next morning, there is chaos in the house as Nobisuke loses his salary. The cop helps them find the money. Everyone calms down and feel happy. Remade as The Nobi's Finances are in Big Trouble! in the 2005 series.
631	"Cross Switch"; Transliteration: "Kurosu Suicchi" (Japanese: クロススイッチ)	November 13, 1981
As Nobita doesn't wish to go to school, Doraemon gives him a cross switch gadget, with which one could exchange their life with others. Nobita misuses the gadget by exchanging himself with his friends. Remade as This Road, That Road, and the Easy Road in the 2005 series.
632	"Ventriloquist Robot"; Transliteration: "Fukuwa Robotto" (Japanese: 腹話ロボット)	November 20, 1981
After Nobita fails in his test, he takes help from Doraemon and uses a ventriloquist doll, to become a better speaker and convince his mother. He later uses the doll to convince Gian to stop singing his new song.
633	"Nobita's Fairy Tale Trip"; Transliteration: "Nobita no Dōwa Ryokō" (Japanese: のび太の童話旅行)	November 20, 1981
Nobita uses Doraemon's fairy tale entry shoes to travel from one fairy tale story to another and later invites Shizuka over to enter the story of Cinderella. However, Shizuka ends up losing her shoe and gets left behind in the story, leaving Nobita to rescue her before she marries the prince.
634	"Chukenper"; Transliteration: "Chūkenpā" (Japanese: チューケンパー)	November 27, 1981
Nobita wishes for a pet that would be a loyal bodyguard to him, so Doraemon gives him a pet robot dog named Chukenper that will fulfill any desire Nobita wishes for. However, things go out of hand when Chukenper starts fulfilling every desire -intentional or unintentional- that Nobita has.
635	"Earnest Gum"; Transliteration: "Shara Gamu" (Japanese: シャラガム)	November 27, 1981
636	"World Peace and Safety Badge"; Transliteration: "Sekai Heiwa Anzen Bajji" (Japanese: 世界平和安全バッヂ)	December 4, 1981
Nobita wishes to be a member of an organisation after his friends join it. But Nobita later realizes it is fake when the goons threaten him and take away all his money. Doraemon assures Nobita of getting things right.
637	"Honest Wave"; Transliteration: "Shōjiki Denpa" (Japanese: ショージキデンパ)	December 4, 1981
638	"Cold Bag"; Transliteration: "Kazebukuro" (Japanese: かぜぶくろ)	December 11, 1981
639	"Help The Swallow Nobita"; Transliteration: "Nobita Tsubame o Sukero" (Japanese: のび太ツバメを助けろ)	December 11, 1981
640	"Compliant Cap"; Transliteration: "Īnari Kyappu" (Japanese: いいなりキャップ)	December 18, 1981
641	"The Sympathy Robot"; Transliteration: "Itawari Robotto" (Japanese: いたわりロボット)	December 18, 1981
642	"Caring Rope"; Transliteration: "Sewayaki Rōpu" (Japanese: せわやきロープ)	December 25, 1981
643	"Nobita's Christmas Play"; Transliteration: "Nobita Gekidan no Kurisumasu" (Japanese: のび太劇団のクリスマス)	December 25, 1981

== 1982 ==
No.	Title	Original release date
S15	"Inventing with the Inventing Machine"; Transliteration: "Hashimeikā de Dai Hatsumei" (Japanese: ハツメイカーで大発明)	January 1, 1982
Doraemon provides a machine that can create any kind of gadget by outputting the plans for the new invention, along with a box of materials to assemble it.
S16	"The Three Times Speed Sticker"; Transliteration: "San-bai Tokei Petanko" (Japanese: 三倍時計ペタンコ)	January 2, 1982
Nobita isn't happy because the New Year celebrations are going to be over. Nobita asks Doraemon for the Three Times Speed Sticker that allows him to do things faster while the world slows down. Remade as The Long, Long, New Years in the 2005 series.
S17	"Nobita's Treasure Hunt"; Transliteration: "Nobita no Takara Sagashi" (Japanese: のび太の宝さがし)	January 3, 1982
644	"Robot Snowman"; Transliteration: "Robotto Yukidaruma" (Japanese: ロボット雪だるま)	January 8, 1982
Nobita makes a robot snowman during the winter. The snowman follows him back home and causes some chaos.
645	"Fantasy Animal Safari Pack"; Transliteration: "Kūsō Dōbutsu Safari Pāku" (Japanese: 空想動物サファリパーク)	January 15, 1982
Nobita and his friends go to an animal safari park to see some unicorns. However, their Safari Craft crashes and now they're stuck without Doraemon.
646	"Air Relay Satellite"; Transliteration: "Kūki Chūkei Eisei" (Japanese: 空気中継衛星)	January 22, 1982
When Suneo shows off his world air cans, Nobita and Doraemon decide to experience various airs of the world using the Air Relay Satellite.
647	"The Conclusion Yarn"; Transliteration: "Musubi no Oito" (Japanese: むすびの糸)	January 29, 1982
Nobita wishes to patch things up with Shizuka after she gets upset with him for missing their meet up. To do this, Doraemon gives him a gadget that will pull two people together if they tie a knot on each other's hand. Nobita attempts to tie a knot on Shizuka's hand to pull her towards him, but it doesn't go as planned.
648	"Reverse Camera"; Transliteration: "Sakasa Kamera" (Japanese: さかさカメラ)	February 5, 1982
649	"The Water Video"; Transliteration: "Mizu Bideo" (Japanese: 水ビデオ)	February 12, 1982
Remade as The Water I Had Seen in the 2005 series.
650	"Time Bomb Sticker"; Transliteration: "Chikutaku Bon Wappen" (Japanese: チクタクボンワッペン)	February 19, 1982
When Nobisuke comes down with the hiccups, Nobita and Doraemon use a Time Bomb Sticker to frighten him and make his hiccups go away. They later use the sticker to scare Gian, but things go haywire when Suneo takes the sticker and gives it to Shizuka.
651	"Identical Scarecrow"; Transliteration: "Sokkuri Kakashi" (Japanese: そっくりかかし)	February 26, 1982
Nobita uses Doraemon's Identical Scarecrow to create a scarecrow of himself to scare off people from plucking the horsetails near their house. However, Suneo arrives and destroys it, causing Nobita to create scarecrows of Gian and Shizuka without them knowing. Meanwhile, Tamako finds a spare Identical Scarecrow and creates a scarecrow of herself to make Nobita complete his homework
652	"Snow in March"; Transliteration: "Sangatsu no Yuki" (Japanese: 三月の雪)	March 5, 1982
Snow does not rain down on Christmas Eve, but the forecast says otherwise and Shizuka is disappointed. Nobita begs Doraemon for a Weather Box, but it is broken. It starts snowing excessively. Remade as Snow at Christmas in the 2005 series.
653	"The Air Crayon"; Transliteration: "Kūki Kureyon" (Japanese: 空気クレヨン)	March 12, 1982
Doraemon introduces a crayon used to make drawings and other markings on areas of thin air.
654	"The Winning Postcard"; Transliteration: "Hitchū Ken-shō Hagaki" (Japanese: 必中けん賞はがき)	March 19, 1982
Nobita really wants to win a lucky draw so he uses Doraemon's savings to buy 5 postcards. However the postcards mysteriously vanish leading Nobita to use a postcard that he found in his room.
655	"Dry Light"; Transliteration: "Dorai・Raito" (Japanese: ドライ・ライト)	March 26, 1982
656	"Let's Make It Easier with Copy Brains"; Transliteration: "Kopī Zunō de Raku o Shiyō" (Japanese: コピー頭脳でラクをしよう)	April 2, 1982
657	"Lost item fishing pool and rod" Transliteration: "Otoshimono Tsuribori to Tsurizao" (Japanese: おとし物つり堀とつりざお)	April 2, 1982
658	"Monster Hat"; Transliteration: "Kaibutsu-kun Bōshi" (Japanese: 怪物くんぼうし)	April 2, 1982
659	"Scolding Rod"; Transliteration: "Kogoto Hiraishin" (Japanese: こごとひらいしん)	April 9, 1982
660	"Chance Camera"; Transliteration: "Chansu Kamera" (Japanese: チャンスカメラ)	April 16, 1982
661	"Animal Speaking Microphone"; Transliteration: "Kyūkan Maiku" (Japanese: 九官マイク)	April 30, 1982
662	"The Souvenir Cloth"; Transliteration: "Omiyage Furoshiki" (Japanese: おみやげふろしき)	May 7, 1982
663	"Radio Controlled Television"; Transliteration: "Rajikon Terebi" (Japanese: ラジコンテレビ)	May 14, 1982
664	"Follow The Princess"; Transliteration: "Oyayubi-hime o Oikakero" (Japanese: おやゆび姫を追いかけろ)	May 28, 1982
665	"Nobita's Fish Festival"; Transliteration: "Nobita no Sakanatsuri" (Japanese: のび太の魚つり)	June 4, 1982
666	"Esper Training Box"; Transliteration: "Esupā Kunren Bokkusu" (Japanese: エスパー訓練ボックス)	June 11, 1982
667	"Time Copy"; Transliteration: "Taimu Kopī" (Japanese: タイムコピー)	June 18, 1982
668	"Dreaming with the Inverse Dream"; Transliteration: "Sakayumen de ī Yumemiyō" (Japanese: サカユメンでいい夢みよう)	June 25, 1982
Nobita is tired of all the bad days he's been having so Doraemon gives him an Inverse Dream pill so that he can have a good dream.
669	"The Substitution Sticker"; Transliteration: "Daiyō Shīru" (Japanese: 代用シール)	July 2, 1982
Nobita uses Doraemon's Substitution Stickers gadget to substitute a phonebook for a manga that he needs to return to Suneo. He later uses the gadget to cause mischief until he substitutes himself for a mailbox to escape from his friends' wrath. However, this causes him to get locked out of his own house. Remade as Nobita Becomes a Sticker!? in the 2005 series.
670	"The Real Veneer"; Transliteration: "Jitsubutsu Beniya" (Japanese: じつぶつベニヤ)	July 9, 1982
Nobita wants to practice swimming for the summer so he and Doraemon use The Real Veener to create a replica of the sea.
671	"Dream Ladder"; Transliteration: "Yume Hashigo" (Japanese: ゆめはしご)	July 16, 1982
While sleeping, Nobita uses Doraemon's Dream Ladder gadget to enter the dreams of Gian, Suneo, and Shizuka.
672	"Let's Play With Water"; Transliteration: "Mizu Zaiku de Asobō" (Japanese: 水ざいくで遊ぼう)	July 23, 1982
It's a hot summer day, so Nobita and his friends go to the beach and use Doraemon's Water Processing Sprinkles to create water objects. Remade in 2005 as "Water Processing Sprinkle."
673	"The Happiness Cards"; Transliteration: "Shiawase Toranpu" (Japanese: しあわせトランプ)	July 30, 1982
Nobita finds a deck of cards that grants 52 wishes, but he needs to watch out for that 53rd card. Remade as The Fearsome Happiness Cards in the 2005 series.
674	"Flattening Iron"; Transliteration: "Betanko Airon" (Japanese: ペタンコアイロン)	August 6, 1982
Nobita, Gian, and Suneo are forced by Gian's cousin to move furniture into his new apartment. When Gian and Suneo leave all the work to Nobita, Doraemon helps him out by using the Flattening Iron to make the furniture moving easier. Remade as Moving with the Completely-Flat Roller in the 2005 series.
675	"The Four-Dimensional Building Extension Blocks"; Transliteration: "Yo-jigen Tatemashi Burokku" (Japanese: 四次元たてましブロック)	August 20, 1982
Doraemon and Nobita have a pillow fight which causes Tamako to stop them. Doraemon concludes that if they can't play on the second floor then they will play on the third floor and takes out a new gadget. By placing a Room Block between the second and first floors, a new room will be created.
676	"Remote Controlled Submarine Set"; Transliteration: "Remokon Sen-Mizu-Kan Setto" (Japanese: ラジコンせん水かんセット)	August 27, 1982
Nobita is unable to come to Suneo's vacation trip due to being sick, so he and Doraemon use the Remote Controlled Submarine Set to go to the area Suneo and the gang are.
677	"Emotion Drink"; Transliteration: "Kangeki Dorinku" (Japanese: カンゲキドリンク)	September 3, 1982
Nobita has been feeling rather passive lately towards everything much to Doraemon's annoyance, so he uses the Emotion Drink to make him more sensitive to things.
678	"Long Time No See Trunk"; Transliteration: "Hisashiburi Toranku" (Japanese: ひさしぶりトランク)	September 10, 1982
Nobita is looking forward to Shizuka coming over to his house to play. But when Shizuka meets an old friend on the way and instead goes with him to her house, Nobita gets jealous and uses a gadget called the Long Time No See Trunk to get Shizuka to come to him, but ends up attracting Gian, Suneo, Sensei, and some random people. Remade as Reunion! Nobita from 5 Years Ago in the 2005 series.
679	"Feather Plane"; Transliteration: "Fezā Purēn" (Japanese: フェザープレーン)	September 17, 1982
Doraemon takes out the Feather Plane and they along with Shizuka go for an air ride before Gian and Suneo try to take the plane for themselves.
680	"Replaceable Nameplate"; Transliteration: "Irekae Hyōsatsu" (Japanese: 入れかえ表札)	October 1, 1982
Nobita uses Doraemon's Replaceable Nameplate to switch residence locations so that the teacher doesn't visit his mother to discuss about his academic performance.
681	"I Want To See The Follow Up Soon"; Transliteration: "Hayaku Tsuzuki ga Mitai" (Japanese: 早くつづきが見たい)	October 8, 1982
682	"The Mechanizing Machine"; Transliteration: "Ningen Meka o Tsukurō" (Japanese: 人間メカを作ろう)	October 15, 1982
Doraemon shows Nobita a gadget that can copy the abilities of any machine, but Gian steals it.
683	"My Heart is Broken"; Transliteration: "Boku Shitsuren Shi Chatta" (Japanese: ぼく失恋しちゃった)	October 22, 1982
Doraemon falls in love with a female cat. However, the cat has feelings for another male cat, much to Doraemon's ire. Remade as Doraemon, In Love in the 2005 series.
684	"New Species Making Book"; Transliteration: "Shinshu Zukan de Yūmei ni" (Japanese: 新種図鑑で有名に)	October 29, 1982
685	"Nobita's Ninja Training"; Transliteration: "Nin-nin Shūgyō Setto" (Japanese: ニンニン修業セット)	November 5, 1982
Nobita wants to be a ninja after reading a Ninja manga. Doraemon gives him a gadget that turns him into a ninja. But being a ninja is not as easy as Nobita thinks.
686	"Partial Evolution Gun"; Transliteration: "Bubun Shinka Gan" (Japanese: 部分進化ガン)	November 12, 1982
When Gian and Suneo decide to capture rabbits located in the hill, Nobita and Doraemon use the Partial Evolution Gun to turn the rabbits into hybrid animals and scare them off.
687	"Horizon Tape"; Transliteration: "Chiheisen Tēpu" (Japanese: 地平線テープ)	November 19, 1982
Nobita wants to see the horizon and so Doraemon uses the Horizon Tape to create such a dimension in Nobita's room. Remade as The Horizon in Nobita's Room in the 2005 series.
688	"Phobia Stamp"; Transliteration: "Kyōfu no Sutanpu" (Japanese: きょうふのスタンプ)	November 26, 1982
When Gian exploits Nobita's phobias for fun, Nobita and Doraemon take revenge on Gian using the Phobia Stamp.
689	"Copy Machine"; Transliteration: "Kopī Tori Yose-ki" (Japanese: コピーとり寄せ機)	December 3, 1982
When Suneo brags to his friends about being invited to Tsubasa Ito's birthday party, Nobita and Doraemon use the Copy Machine to exploit his lie.
690	"Cuckoo Egg"; Transliteration: "Kakkō Tamago" (Japanese: カッコータマゴ)	December 10, 1982
After getting tired of Tamako's strict tyranny, Nobita uses Doraemon's Cuckoo Egg to trade places with Suneo.
691	"What If You're A Genius"; Transliteration: "Moshimo Bokkusu de Tensai ni" (Japanese: もしもボックスで天才に)	December 17, 1982
Nobita uses Doraemon's What If Phone Box to make it look like he's a genius due to his napping.
692	"Flying Christmas"; Transliteration: "Sora Tobu Kurisumasu" (Japanese: 空とぶクリスマス)	December 24, 1982
When Nobita doesn't get invited to Suneo's Christmas party, he and Doraemon decide to hold a Christmas party of their own with help from Dorami.

== 1983 ==
No.	Title	Original release date
S18	"Gathering in the Stone Age"; Transliteration: "Sekki Jidai ni Shūgō" (Japanese: 石器時代に集合!!)	January 1, 1983
S19	"Three Wheeled Airplane"; Transliteration: "Sanrin Hikōki" (Japanese: 三輪飛行機)	January 2, 1983
Everyone in class has been deciding on their dream job, and Nobita wants to become a jumbo jet pilot. As a result, the test flight of Nobita Airlines has begun.
693	"Playing God"; Transliteration: "Kamisama Gokko" (Japanese: 神さまごっこ)	January 7, 1983
694	"Magic Dictionary"; Transliteration: "Mahō Jiten" (Japanese: まほうじてん)	January 14, 1983
After watching a magical girl show, Nobita wishes to have magic powers and Doraemon gives him the Magic Dictionary so that he can cast some spells.
695	"Let's Recall The First Impression"; Transliteration: "Saisho no Kandō o Yobi Samasou" (Japanese: 最初の感動を呼びさまそう)	January 21, 1983
Doraemon yells very loudly inside the house, waking Nobita up. He frets that he will be late and his teacher will yell at him again. Remade as Remember! The Excitement of That Day in the 2005 series.
696	"Freeze Framer"; Transliteration: "Shun-kan Kotei Kamera" (Japanese: しゅん間固定カメラ)	January 28, 1983
Nobita and Doraemon use the Freeze Framer to freeze Shizuka, a baseball, and then Nobita. Later they use the gadget on Gian to save everyone from his singing. Remade as Freeze-Framing Him in the 2005 series.
697	"Fly In The Sky With The Voice Thickener"; Transliteration: "Sora Tobu Koe Katamarin" (Japanese: 空とぶコエカタマリン)	February 4, 1983
Remade as Flying Through the Sky on the Word "WOW" in the 2005 series.
698	"The Mirror World"; Transliteration: "Kagami no Naka no Sekai" (Japanese: 鏡の中の世界)	February 11, 1983
Nobita wishes to go to another world where Gian and Suneo won't chase him, so Doraemon gives him a Mirror World to travel into another dimension.
699	"Instant Robot"; Transliteration: "Insutanto Robotto" (Japanese: インスタントロボット)	February 18, 1983
Doraemon uses the instant robot kit to create a substitute robot of himself in order to take care of Nobita while he's away. Nobita later uses the instant robot kit to create substitute robots of him and his friends so that they can do his chores.
700	"The Human Book Cover"; Transliteration: "Ningen Bukkukabā" (Japanese: 人間ブックカバー)	February 25, 1983
701	"After All The Test Is Scary"; Transliteration: "Tesuto wa Yappari Kowai" (Japanese: テストはやっぱりこわい)	March 4, 1983
Suneo gets full marks from the class test, but isn't willing to show it to Gian or Nobita (who got 15 and 10 marks respectively) and decides to hide it, causing both of them to get suspicious. They conclude that Suneo might have gotten a zero and with Doraemon's help, destroy the paper before Suneo's mother finds out. Remade as Big Trouble! Suneo's Test Result in the 2005 series.
702	"Fixed Position Spray"; Transliteration: "Ichi Kotei Supurē" (Japanese: 位置固定スプレー)	March 11, 1983
Nobita gets scolded for disorganizing things so he uses Doraemon's Fixed Position Spray to automatically put everything back to where they came from.
703	"Gift Survey"; Transliteration: "Ankētā de Purezento" (Japanese: アンケーターでプレゼント)	March 18, 1983
It's Shizuka's birthday and Nobita and Doraemon are having a hard time figuring out what present to give her. After using the Hair Plucking Mirror and Questionputer gadgets they find out about Shizuka's favorite food, which is roasted sweet potatoes, and decide to make it for her gift, not aware of her embarrassment towards it. This leads to Shizuka kicking them out of her birthday party. Remade as The Secret of Shizuka-chan's Heart in the 2005 series.
704	"Gian's Fanclub"; Transliteration: "Jaian no Fankurabu" (Japanese: ジャイアンのファンクラブ)	March 25, 1983
S20	"No Garbage Dump Hall"; Transliteration: "Naisho Gomisute Hōru" (Japanese: ないしょごみすてホール)	March 30, 1983
S21	"Baby Elephant Hana"; Transliteration: "Kozō no Hana-chan" (Japanese: 子ゾウのハナちゃん)	March 30, 1983
705	"Let's Play In Space"; Transliteration: "Uchū Tanken Gokko" (Japanese: 宇宙たんけんごっこ)	April 1, 1983
706	"Invincible Bottlecaps"; Transliteration: "Muteki Menkorētamu" (Japanese: 無敵メンコレータム)	April 8, 1983
707	"Gian on TV"; Transliteration: "Jaian Terebi ni Deru" (Japanese: ジャイアンテレビに出る)	April 15, 1983
708	"Cartoonist Jaiko"; Transliteration: "Mangaka Jaiko" (Japanese: まんがかジャイ子)	April 22, 1983
Gian assembles Nobita and the others, and threatens to beat them up if they do not laugh at Jaiko's manga when it comes out. Doraemon finds Nobita forcefully trying to laugh, and lends him the Magic Belly that makes him laugh uncontrollably whenever the stomach plate is rubbed.
709	"Shizuka's Necklace"; Transliteration: "Shizuka no Nekkuresu" (Japanese: しずかのネックレス)	April 29, 1983
Shizuka sneaks out her mother's necklace to the empty lot to show it to Nobita, Gian, and Suneo. However, when Gian accidentally pulls the necklace and causes the pearls to scatter, it's up to Doraemon, Nobita, and Shizuka to create a replica necklace and cover the accident from Shizuka's mother. Remade as The Pearl Producing Oyster Case in the 2005 series.
710	"Barrier Point"; Transliteration: "Bariyā Pointo" (Japanese: バリヤーポイント)	May 6, 1983
After getting beaten up by Gian and Suneo and having general misfortune occur to him, Nobita asks Doraemon for a gadget that will create a barrier around him. However, when he misuses the gadget, Doraemon teams up with Gian and Suneo to teach Nobita a lesson.
711	"The Robot That Breaks Bad Habits"; Transliteration: "Yame Sase Robotto" (Japanese: やめさせロボット)	May 13, 1983
712	"The Fuse to Blow Away the Intolerables"; Transliteration: "Iyana koto Hyūzu" (Japanese: いやなことヒューズ)	May 20, 1983
Doraemon introduces a gadget that, when things will happen, makes the user faint temporarily.
713	"The Secret Watchdog"; Transliteration: "Himitsu Genshuken" (Japanese: ヒミツゲンシュ犬)	May 27, 1983
Nobita uses Doraemon's Secret Keeper Dog to cover up breaking his dad's pen and getting another zero on his test.
714	"Space Lifeboat"; Transliteration: "Uchū Kyūmei Bōto" (Japanese: 宇宙救命ボート)	June 3, 1983
715	"Ghost Jujubes"; Transliteration: "Urameshi Doroppu" (Japanese: うらめしドロップ)	June 17, 1983
Tired of Gian's bullying, Nobita and Doraemon use the Ghost Candy to turn into ghosts and trouble him during the night.
716	"Wanted Person Finder"; Transliteration: "Hoshī-nin Tanchi-ki" (Japanese: ほしい人探知機)	June 24, 1983
717	"Pencil Missiles"; Transliteration: "Penshiru Misairu" (Japanese: ペンシルミサイル)	July 1, 1983
718	"Transformation Drink"; Transliteration: "Henshin Dorinku" (Japanese: 変身ドリンク)	July 8, 1983
After Nobita drinks a liquid from Doraemon that allows him to change into any animal he thinks of, he goes out to prank Gian and Suneo. However, when he loses his clothes, he must return home. Remade as Transform, Transform, and Transform Again in the 2005 series.
719	"Headmaster Sign"; Transliteration: "Iemoto Kanban" (Japanese: 家元かんばん)	July 15, 1983
720	"Doesn't Anyone Want a Nobita Merchandise?"; Transliteration: "Nobita wa Ikaga" (Japanese: のび太はいかが)	July 22, 1983
Doraemon provides a machine that makes merchandise out of anything which appears before its lens. Nobita tries to use the machine, and a board game about Nobita's life comes out.
721	"A Store that sells anything for 10 yen" Transliteration: "10-en nan demo Sutoa" (Japanese: 10円なんでもストア)	July 29, 1983
722	"Object Electrical Transmission Adapter"; Transliteration: "Buttai Densō Adaputā" (Japanese: 物体電送アダプター)	August 5, 1983
Dekisugi gets an 85 on his test much to the shock of everyone else in the class. Shizuka comes to Nobita's house and explains to him and Doraemon that Dekisugi got a call from someone who's blackmailing him. Nobita and Doraemon travel several hours into the future to Dekisugi's room and use the Object Electrical Transmission Adapter to find out who the culprit is. Remade as It's Solved! The Dekisugi Case in the 2005 series.
723	"Robinson Crusoe Set"; Transliteration: "Robinson Kurūsō Setto" (Japanese: ロビンソンクルーソーセット)	August 12, 1983
Nobita tries to live like Robinson Crusoe with an item designed to let one enjoy the thrill of living on an uninhabited island.
724	"Farewell Nobita"; Transliteration: "Sayonara Nobita" (Japanese: さよならのび太)	August 12, 1983
Feeling jealous of Shizuka showing feelings for a friend transferring, Nobita uses the What-If Phone Booth to make it such that his family are transferring to America. But when his friends - especially Shizuka- express their grief for him leaving, Nobita realizes his mistake and tries to use the Booth to undo the incident. However, the machine breaks leaving Doraemon to find a way to fix it before he and Nobita's family move to America for good. This episode would be remade as "Goodbye to You" in 2004, and both would be remade as Goodbye to You in the 2005 series.
725	"A Sweethome with Shizuka"; Transliteration: "Shizuka-chan to Suītohōmu" (Japanese: しずかちゃんとスイートホーム)	August 19, 1983
After getting jealous once again of Shizuka and Dekisugi showing affection for each other, Nobita uses Doraemon's Sweethome to make Shizuka fall in love with him.
726	"Happy Insurance Machine"; Transliteration: "Shiawase Hokenki" (Japanese: しあわせ保険機)	August 26, 1983
727	"Soulful Walking Stick"; Transliteration: "Tamashī Sutekki" (Japanese: たましいステッキ)	September 2, 1983
728	"Flying Dress"; Transliteration: "Sora Tobu Doresu" (Japanese: 空とぶドレス)	September 9, 1983
729	"Shiritori Makeover Capsule"; Transliteration: "Shiritori Henshin Kapuseru" (Japanese: しりとり変身カプセル)	September 16, 1983
730	"Ten Commandments Tablet"; Transliteration: "Jikkai Sekiban" (Japanese: 十戒石板)	September 23, 1983
731	"Homing Plane"; Transliteration: "Densho Hikōki" (Japanese: でんしょひこうき)	September 30, 1983
732	"SL Chimney"; Transliteration: "SL Endotsu" (Japanese: SLえんとつ)	October 7, 1983
733	"Capacity Cassette"; Transliteration: "Nōryoku Kasetto" (Japanese: 能力カセット)	October 14, 1983
734	"Exchange Room Switch"; Transliteration: "Heya Kōkan Suicchi" (Japanese: へやこうかんスイッチ)	October 21, 1983
735	"Fake Hook"; Transliteration: "Misekake Tsuri Hari" (Japanese: みせかけつり針)	October 28, 1983
736	"Princess Kaguya Robot"; Transliteration: "Kaguya Robotto" (Japanese: かぐやロボット)	November 4, 1983
737	"Rental Tip"; Transliteration: "Kashikiri Chippu" (Japanese: 貸し切りチップ)	November 11, 1983
738	"Book Want Seasoning"; Transliteration: "Hon no Aji no Tomo" (Japanese: 本の味の友)	November 18, 1983
739	"Useless Time Regaining Pump"; Transliteration: "Muda Jikan Torimodoshi Ponpu" (Japanese: むだ時間とりもどしポンプ)	November 25, 1983
Nobita takes a nap and ends up wasting time. Doraemon teaches Nobita a lesson on the importance of time with a Useless Time Regaining Pump that can freeze and recover the lost time so he can accomplish all the tasks.
740	"Determination Concrete"; Transliteration: "Kesshin Konkurīto" (Japanese: 決心コンクリート)	December 2, 1983
741	"Animal Transformation and Repayment Medicine"; Transliteration: "Dōbutsu Henshin Ongaeshi Gusuri" (Japanese: 動物変身恩返しグスリ)	December 9, 1983
742	"Touching Glove"; Transliteration: "Tacchi Tebukuro" (Japanese: タッチ手ぶくろ)	December 16, 1983
743	"Anytime Anywhere Rollerskate"; Transliteration: "Doko demo Dare demo Rōrā Sukēto" (Japanese: どこでも誰でもローラースケート)	December 23, 1983
744	"Afterward Album"; Transliteration: "Ato kara Arubamu" (Japanese: あとからアルバム)	December 30, 1983
Nobita's sketch homework turns for trouble as he finds that Doraemon isn't a good model for his painting and plays a prank instead. Doraemon uses the Afterward Album to prove Nobita was the culprit for that prank and they later use the album for various shenanigans.

== 1984 ==
No.	Title	Original release date
S22	"Child Hang Glider"; Transliteration: "Okosama Hanguguraidā" (Japanese: お子さまハンググライダー)	January 1, 1984
S23	"Nobita's Gulliver Travels"; Transliteration: "Nobita no Garibā Ryokō" (Japanese: のび太のガリバー旅行)	January 1, 1984
After reading a book titled Gulliver's Travels, Nobita wants to explore a world similar to Lilliput, so he and Doraemon travel to a country full of tiny inhabitants. However, they are not welcomed by the people there. Remade as The Troublesome Gulliver in the 2005 series.
745	"The Latent Clockwork Land Ship"; Transliteration: "Zenmai-shiki Sen-chi-kan" (Japanese: ゼンマイ式潜地艦)	January 6, 1984
Nobita and Doraemon travel in the Latent Clockwork Land Ship to retrieve Nobita's lost shoe and backpack while escaping from Gian and Suneo, who are pursuing them.
746	"The Act Predictor Lens"; Transliteration: "Suru koto Renzu" (Japanese: することレンズ)	January 13, 1984
Nobita uses lens that predicts what people will do.
747	"The Devil's Malice"; Transliteration: "Akuma no Ijiwāru" (Japanese: 悪魔のイジワール)	January 20, 1984
748	"Automatic Buying Machine"; Transliteration: "Jidō Kaitori-ki" (Japanese: 自動買い取り機)	January 27, 1984
749	"Brute Force Gun"; Transliteration: "Tamashī Fukikomi Jū" (Japanese: たましいふきこみ銃)	February 3, 1984
750	"Sympathy Medal"; Transliteration: "Kawaiso Medaru" (Japanese: カワイソメダル)	February 10, 1984
751	"The Moses Stick"; Transliteration: "Mōze Sutekki" (Japanese: モーゼステッキ)	February 17, 1984
Gian and Suneo come to Nobita and tell him that their remote control boat crash was his fault, despite Gian clearly being the one who recklessly crashed the toy. Doraemon then tells the story of Moses to Nobita and then takes out the Moses Stick to find the boat.
752	"Drunken Lid"; Transliteration: "Honwa Kyappu" (Japanese: ホンワカキャップ)	February 24, 1984
After seeing his father and his friend drinking beer, Nobita uses Doraemon's gadget, the Drunken Lid to get drunk.
753	"Motor Nerve Controller"; Transliteration: "Undō Shinkei Kontorōrā" (Japanese: 運動神経コントローラー)	March 2, 1984
754	"Time Difference Clock"; Transliteration: "Jisa Dokei" (Japanese: 時差時計)	March 9, 1984
755	"Multiplying Bank"; Transliteration: "Fuēru Ginkō" (Japanese: フエール銀行)	March 16, 1984
756	"Peeking Board"; Transliteration: "Nozoki Ana Bōdo" (Japanese: のぞき穴ボード)	March 23, 1984
Doraemon and Nobita use a gadget to find out who's the dog owner whose dog pooped in front of their house.
757	"Cloud Freezing Gas"; Transliteration: "Kumo Katame Gasu" (Japanese: 雲かためガス)	March 30, 1984
Nobita, Shizuka, and Doraemon head to the sky to avoid the constant noise in the neighborhood. They use the Cloud Freezing Gas gadget to create a Roman-like area. However, Gian and Suneo find out about this and use Tamako to drive Nobita away so that they can occupy the area for themselves.
758	"Goodbye Kibou"; Transliteration: "Saraba Kībō" (Japanese: さらばキー坊)	April 6, 1984
Note: Original anime episode and basis of story for Doraemon: Nobita and the Green Giant Legend.
759	"Memory Disk"; Transliteration: "Memorī Disuku" (Japanese: メモリーディスク)	April 13, 1984
Nobita is scared by Gian and Suneo and wetted his pant. He now must find a way to prevent the two from telling the others especially Shizuka.
760	"Curious Antenna"; Transliteration: "Yajiuma Antena" (Japanese: やじうまアンテナ)	April 20, 1984
761	"The Best Fan Letter for Gian"; Transliteration: "Jaian e no Hotto na Retā" (Japanese: ジャイアンへのホットなレター)	April 27, 1984
Gian complains to Doraemon and Nobita about the lack of letter from his (forced) fans, and "asks" them to hold a competition with the prize being his special portrait.
762	"Locker Cutter"; Transliteration: "Rokkā Kattā" (Japanese: ロッカーカッター)	May 4, 1984
Nobita uses Doraemon's Locker Cutter gadget to scare Gian, Suneo, and Shizuka, so they team up with Doraemon to teach Nobita a lesson.
763	"It's Tough To Be a Rain Man"; Transliteration: "Ame Otoko wa Tsuraiyo" (Japanese: 雨男はつらいよ)	May 11, 1984
Nobisuke is invited to play golf by his boss but fears that the weather will go awry due to his reputation as the rain man, so it's up to Doraemon and Nobita to solve things.
764	"Underground Fishing"; Transliteration: "Chichū Sakana Tsuri" (Japanese: 地中さかなつり)	May 18, 1984
After Suneo brags about his fishing experience, Doraemon and Nobita use a gadget to do underground fishing in the empty lot.
765	"Echo Mountain"; Transliteration: "Yamabiko Yama" (Japanese: 山びこ山)	May 25, 1984
Tamako tells Nobita to complete his homework before he goes out to play. Doraemon helps Nobita with his new echo mountain gadget, but Nobita misuses it on his mother when she falls asleep and steps out to play. Nobita uses the gadget against Gian, as he never sticks to his words. After Nobita and Doraemon return home, Tamako yells at Nobita and makes him complete his homework.
766	"Image Gum"; Transliteration: "Imēji Gamu" (Japanese: イメージガム)	June 1, 1984
767	"Super Real Diorama Plan"; Transliteration: "Chō Riaru・Jiorama Sakusen" (Japanese: 超リアル・ジオラマ作戦)	June 8, 1984
768	"Energy-Saving Hot Air Balloon"; Transliteration: "Enerugī Setsuyaku Nekkikyū" (Japanese: エネルギー節約熱気球)	June 15, 1984
Nobita demands a hot air balloon from Doraemon as he wanted to get Gian and Suneo jealous. Later, Nobita sees Shizuka and takes her along with him for a ride.
769	"God Set"; Transliteration: "Kamisama Setto" (Japanese: 神さまセット)	June 22, 1984
Doraemon gives Nobita a Godly gadget so that he can watch everyone on earth. But later, Nobita misuses the gadget by getting his work done by his friends.
770	"Pet Pen (episode)" Transliteration: "Petto Pen" (Japanese: ペットペン)	June 29, 1984
771	"Eskimo Essence"; Transliteration: "Esukimō Ekisu" (Japanese: エスキモーエキス)	July 6, 1984
On a sunny day, Gian plans for an endurance contest. As Nobita gets worried about losing the contest, Doraemon gives Nobita Eskimo essence and helps him win.
772	"Watercycline"; Transliteration: "Santain" (Japanese: サンタイン)	July 13, 1984
Nobita uses Doraemon's Watercycline gadget to levitate in the air and trouble Gian and Suneo.
773	"I've Got a Spare Fourth Dimensional Pocket"; Transliteration: "Yo-jigen Poketto no Supea" (Japanese: 四次元ポケットのスペア)	July 20, 1984
Doraemon takes his 4D Pocket to dry, and assures Nobita that he has a spare 4D Pocket which he can use. When Doraemon goes out on a date with a cat, Nobita takes the original 4D Pocket.
774	"Ultra Hero"; Transliteration: "Urutora Hīrō" (Japanese: ウルトラヒーロー)	July 27, 1984
Nobita goes out to play but he's put aside by his friends. Later, Doraemon helps Nobita to become an ultra hero to impress his friends and play with them.
775	"Magic Handkerchief"; Transliteration: "Majikko Hankachi" (Japanese: マジックハンカチ)	August 3, 1984
Doraemon gives Nobita a magic handkerchief so that he can impress Shizuka. Later, Nobita disappears under the magical handkerchief but his friends find him.
776	"Hoi of the Donjara Village"; Transliteration: "Donjara-mura no Hoi" (Japanese: ドンジャラ村のホイ)	August 10, 1984
777	"Typhoon Trap And Tank"; Transliteration: "Taifū Torappu to Fūzōko" (Japanese: 台風トラップと風蔵庫)	August 17, 1984
Nobita is unable to sleep due a storm so Doraemon uses the Typhoon Trap and Tank to store the storm.
778	"The Sight Seeing Window"; Transliteration: "Kankōryokō Mado" (Japanese: かんこうりょこう窓)	August 24, 1984
779	"Space-time Replacement Machine"; Transliteration: "Jikūkan Torikae-ki" (Japanese: 時空間とりかえ機)	August 31, 1984
780	"Human Magnet Belt"; Transliteration: "Ningen Jishaku Beruto" (Japanese: 人間磁石ベルト)	September 7, 1984
781	"Instant Sea Making Machine"; Transliteration: "Sokiseki Umi Tsukuri-ki" (Japanese: 即席海つくり機)	September 21, 1984
782	"Set The Room Guard"; Transliteration: "Rūmu Gādo Setto" (Japanese: ルームガードセット)	September 28, 1984
To avoid Nobita getting scolded by his mother again, Doraemon uses a room guard set invention to make Nobita's mother not come into his room unless she says the correct password. Later on, Nobita decides to change the password to a harder one, but he can't remember it, which leads him to an electrical shock by the guard set. Remade as Entry to Nobita's Room is Forbidden in the 2005 series.
783	"Who is the Mask of Academic?"; Transliteration: "Gakkō Kamen Tōjō" (Japanese: ガッコー仮面登場)	October 5, 1984
Nobita is slacking off on schoolwork. Suddenly, a mysterious masked man opens the door and offers to be Nobita's personal tutor. Mask of Academic pulls out a whip to threaten Nobita into studying.
784	"Earthquake Training Paper"; Transliteration: "Jishin Kunren Pēpā" (Japanese: 地震訓練ペーパー)	October 12, 1984
785	"Spirit Robot"; Transliteration: "Robotto Haigorei" (Japanese: ロボット背後霊)	October 19, 1984
786	"Gian's Annoying Concert"; Transliteration: "Jaian no Meiwaku Konsāto" (Japanese: ジャイアンのめいわくコンサート)	October 26, 1984
Gian has to open his annoying concert again.
787	"The Sensory Monitor"; Transliteration: "Kankaku Monitā" (Japanese: 感覚モニター)	November 2, 1984
788	"Elements of Synthetic Mine"; Transliteration: "Gōsei Kōzan no Moto" (Japanese: 合成鉱山の素)	November 9, 1984
789	"Nobita's Son Ran Away From Home"; Transliteration: "Wakarazu-ya no Papa wa, Nobita" (Japanese: わからずやのパパは、のび太)	November 16, 1984
Nobita's father scolds him for constantly lazing about instead of studying. Just as Nobita decides to run away, Nobisuke, his son from the future arrives and decides to stay in the past to avoid responsibilities back home.
790	"Reality Video Machine"; Transliteration: "Genjitsu Bideo-Ka-ki" (Japanese: 現実ビデオ化機)	November 23, 1984
Nobita uses Doraemon's Reality Video Machine to manipulate the baseball match so that he helps the team win and does not get kicked out.
791	"Let's Return Sake With The Liquid Spawner"; Transliteration: "Sairan'eki de Sake o Modosō" (Japanese: サイラン液でサケをもどそう)	November 30, 1984
792	"Candid Camera"; Transliteration: "Dokkiri Bideo" (Japanese: ドッキリビデオ)	December 7, 1984
793	"Repellent Sticker"; Transliteration: "Yakuyoke Shīru" (Japanese: やくよけシール)	December 14, 1984
794	"The Harley's Tail"; Transliteration: "Harī no Shoppu" (Japanese: ハリーのしっぽ)	December 21, 1984
Nobita and Doraemon travel back to the past to find out about the family's buried treasure.
795	"Power Battery"; Transliteration: "Chikara Denchi" (Japanese: 力電池)	December 28, 1984

== 1985 ==
No.	Title	Original release date
S24	"The Image Light Cap"; Transliteration: "Imēji Raito Kyappu" (Japanese: イメージライトキャップ)	January 1, 1985
Suneo's little brother Sunetsugu has come to visit from America, and Suneo is frantic because he has told many lies about himself, so he asks Doraemon for help. Remade as Suneo is the Ideal Big Brother in the 2005 series.
796	"The Machine for Getting Off the Earth"; Transliteration: "Chikyū Gesha Mashin" (Japanese: 地球下車マシン)	January 4, 1985
Doraemon introduces a device to escape the Earth.
797	"The Adventure Tea"; Transliteration: "Adobencha" (Japanese: アドベン茶)	January 11, 1985
On a day that Nobita's mom asks his dad to fix the roof of the house, he is sent on a thrilling adventure after he consumes the Adventure Tea.
798	"The Prank Toy Machine"; Transliteration: "Itazura Omocha-ka-ki" (Japanese: いたずらオモチャ化機)	January 18, 1985
When Suneo invites Nobita over only to prank him, Nobita uses Doraemon's Prank Toy Machine to play pranks on Suneo in revenge.
799	"Anything Plush Toy Set"; Transliteration: "Nan demo Nuigurumi Setto" (Japanese: なんでもぬいぐるみセット)	January 25, 1985
When Suneo unintentionally upsets Shizuka by buying a plush toy she wanted to buy, Nobita and Doraemon use the Anything Plush Toy set to create more plush toys and cheer her up. Remade in the 2005 series as "Everything is Doll."
800	"Automatic Return Ticket"; Transliteration: "Jidō Hensō Nifuda" (Japanese: 自動返送荷札)	February 1, 1985
801	"The Friend Circle"; Transliteration: "Tomodachi no Wa" (Japanese: 友だちの輪)	February 8, 1985
Nobita wishes to befriend a girl named Mizue, but her grandfather Kaminari dislikes him. Doraemon gives him a gadget called a Friend Circle so Nobita can get closer to the girl by making friends with Kaminari.
802	"Dramatic Gas"; Transliteration: "Doramachikku Gasu" (Japanese: ドラマチックガス)	February 15, 1985
Doraemon uses a dramatic gas to kill Nobita's boredom.
803	"Climb Paper"; Transliteration: "Tobiretto Pēpā" (Japanese: トビレットペーパー)	February 22, 1985
804	"Camu Camu Cat Food"; Transliteration: "Kamu-kamu Kyatto Fūdo" (Japanese: カムカムキャットフード)	March 1, 1985
805	"Doraemon Takes a Day Off!!"; Transliteration: "Doraemon ni Kyūjitsu o" (Japanese: ドラえもんに休日を)	March 8, 1985
Doraemon gives a Nobita a Doraemon emergency button and goes on a vacation with Mii-Chan. Nobita gets into trouble a few times but restrains himself from pressing the button.
806	"Existence Can"; Transliteration: "Sonzaikan" (Japanese: そんざいかん)	March 15, 1985
807	"The Confidence Eliminator"; Transliteration: "Jishin Guratsu Ki" (Japanese: 自信ぐらつ機)	March 22, 1985
Doraemon uses The Confidence Eliminator to complain to the Snack House boss about the dorayaki, but Nobita uses it to upset Suneo, Gian and Shizuka.
808	"A Company That Can Handle Anything"; Transliteration: "Nan demo Hikiuke Kaisha" (Japanese: なんでも引きうけ会社)	March 29, 1985
809	"Save the Wolf Family!!"; Transliteration: "Ōkami Ikka o Sukue!!" (Japanese: オオカミ一家を救え!!)	April 5, 1985
810	"Time Knothole"; Transliteration: "Taimu Fushiana" (Japanese: タイムふしあな)	April 19, 1985
811	"Lizard Regenerator"; Transliteration: "Tokage-ron" (Japanese: トカゲロン)	April 26, 1985
812	"Forcibly Cash Card"; Transliteration: "Muriyari Kyasshi Kādo" (Japanese: ムリヤリキャッシュカード)	May 3, 1985
813	"Accelerating Syrup"; Transliteration: "Denkō Sekka" (Japanese: デンコーセッカ)	May 10, 1985
814	"Message Cannon"; Transliteration: "Messēji Taihō" (Japanese: メッセージ大砲)	May 17, 1985
Doraemon and Nobita find a delicious Yellow Berry at the mountain, and they must find a way to tell Shizuka without letting Gian and Suneo know about it.
815	"The Clay Robot"; Transliteration: "Nendoroido" (Japanese: ネンドロイド)	May 24, 1985
Nobita decides to create several clay robot clones to mimic himself and his friends.
816	"The Hornet's Nest"; Transliteration: "Shizumebachi no Su" (Japanese: シズメバチの巣)	May 31, 1985
817	"Anger Energy Observation Chart"; Transliteration: "Ikari Enerugī Kansoku Chāto" (Japanese: 怒りエネルギー観測チャート)	June 7, 1985
818	"Course Checker"; Transliteration: "Kōsu Chekkā" (Japanese: コースチェッカー)	June 14, 1985
819	"Dimension Roller"; Transliteration: "Jigen Rōrā" (Japanese: 次元ローラー)	June 21, 1985
820	"Adjustment of True Feelings"; Transliteration: "Jasuto Honne" (Japanese: ジャストホンネ)	June 28, 1985
After Suneo gets shrugged by others for requesting Gian to hold a concert, he seeks Doraemon's Just Honne pills to become honest.
821	"The Imprinting Egg"; Transliteration: "Surikomi Tamago" (Japanese: 刷りこみたまご)	July 5, 1985
Nobita gets jealous of Shizuka spending time with Dekisugi and with Doraemon's help, traps Shizuka inside the Imprinting Egg to make her fall in love with him. However, due to Dekisugi falling in Nobita's room just as the Imprinting Egg hatches, Shizuka falls in love with Dekisugi instead. Remade as Shizuka-chan, in an Egg in the 2005 series.
822	"The Frustrating Energy Detector"; Transliteration: "Iraira Enerugī Tanachi-ki" (Japanese: イライラエネルギー探知機)	July 12, 1985
823	"Anything Common Discount Ticket"; Transliteration: "Nan demo Kyōtsū Waribikken" (Japanese: なんでも共通割引券)	July 19, 1985
824	""Make it better" Spray"; Transliteration: "Heta Uma Supurē" (Japanese: へたうまスプレー)	July 26, 1985
825	"Procrastinating With the Sooner-or-Later Chestnut"; Transliteration: "Agesage Kuri" (Japanese: 上げ下げくり)	August 2, 1985
Nobita is chased by a dog and almost hit by a ball, which forces him to use a gadget that delays the event to tomorrow.
826	"Object Conversion Gun"; Transliteration: "Buttai Henkan Jū" (Japanese: 物体変換銃)	August 9, 1985
827	"Challenge The Peach Island Case"; Transliteration: "Urashima Jiken no Nazo ni Chōsen" (Japanese: 浦島事件のなぞに挑戦)	August 16, 1985
828	"Ghost Agitation on Temple"; Transliteration: "Yamadera no Yūreī Sōdō" (Japanese: 山寺のユーレイ騒動)	August 16, 1985
Remade as But, I Saw a Ghost! in the 2005 series.
829	"Business Bodyguard"; Transliteration: "Oshikake Gādoman" (Japanese: おしかけガードマン)	August 23, 1985
830	"The Reversing Bomb"; Transliteration: "Ippatsu Gyakuten Bakudan" (Japanese: 一発逆転ばくだん)	August 30, 1985
831	"Strong Stone"; Transliteration: "Tsuyoi Ishi" (Japanese: 強いイシ)	September 6, 1985
Tired of Nobita being lazy, Doraemon takes out the Strong Stone to make him commit to jogging for an hour. However, Nobita accidentally sets the commitment to one year, causing the stone to attack him. Doraemon must now figure out a way to stop the stone before it seriously injures Nobita.
832	"The Hardening Light"; Transliteration: "Kachin-kachin Raito" (Japanese: カチンカチンライト)	September 13, 1985
Nobita and Doraemon use a gadget to freeze the rain and prevent the clothes from getting wet. They later use it to save Gian and Suneo from a forest fire. However unbeknownst to them, they accidentally used the gadget to freeze Shizuka's bathtub while taking a bath, which she later finds out and is furious with them.
833	"Gian's Goodbye Concert"; Transliteration: "Jaian no Sayonara Konsāto" (Japanese: ジャイアンのさよならコンサート)	September 20, 1985
834	"Always Eyes and Mouth"; Transliteration: "Shucchō Kuchi Me" (Japanese: しゅっちょう口目)	September 27, 1985
835	"Miniature Garden Series"; Transliteration: "Hakoniwa Shirīzu" (Japanese: 箱庭シリーズ)	October 4, 1985
836	"Anywhere Fan"; Transliteration: "Bashō Ōgi" (Japanese: バショーおうぎ)	October 11, 1985
837	"Invisible Shadow"; Transliteration: "Kagenagara" (Japanese: かげながら)	October 18, 1985
838	"Reporter Robot"; Transliteration: "Repōtā Robotto" (Japanese: レポーターロボット)	October 25, 1985
839	"Blind Spot Star"; Transliteration: "Mōten Hoshi" (Japanese: モーテン星)	November 1, 1985
Nobita uses Doraemon's Blind Spot Star to protect Shizuka from bad luck, but things go wrong. Eventually, the star's effects wear off and Doraemon, Shizuka, Gian, and Suneo confront Nobita over the mayhem he caused.
840	"The "Done It" Tuning Fork"; Transliteration: "Tsumorināru" (Japanese: ツモリナール)	November 8, 1985
841	"Fictitious Character Egg"; Transliteration: "Kakū Jinbutsu Tamago" (Japanese: 架空人物たまご)	November 15, 1985
842	"The Stupidity Time Bombs"; Transliteration: "Jigen Bakadan" (Japanese: 時限バカ弾)	November 22, 1985
Doraemon gives Nobita the Stupidity Time Bombs, which makes Tamako and Gian stupid, but by mistake he uses it on himself.
843	"The Handmade Cloud Set"; Transliteration: "Tetzukuri Kumo Setto" (Japanese: 手づくり雲セット)	November 29, 1985
844	"The Determination Scissors"; Transliteration: "Omoikiri Hasami" (Japanese: 思い切りハサミ)	December 6, 1985
845	"Nobita's 0-Point Escape Plan"; Transliteration: "0-ten Dasshutsu Sakusen" (Japanese: 0点脱出作戦)	December 13, 1985
Not wanting to get a 0 on his test again, Nobita uses the Time Machine to travel to the future and cheat so that he can get an A. However he is stopped by his future counterpart. Nobita decides to travel back to the present and study for real in order to pass his test. His plan succeeds and he gets a passing grade much to the joy of Tamako and Doraemon.
846	"The Christmas Present"; Transliteration: "Shite Kurejitto Kādo" (Japanese: シテクレジットカード)	December 20, 1985
847	"Game Book"; Transliteration: "Gēmu Bukku" (Japanese: ゲームブック)	December 27, 1985
It's a rainy day and Nobita, Gian, Suneo, and Dekisugi decide to play an adventure game with Shizuka as the damsel in distress through Doraemon's Game Book. However, Nobita, Gian and Suneo decide to cheat and fall for a trap when they reach the end.

== 1986 ==
No.	Title	Original release date
S25	"Slacker's New Year Set"; Transliteration: "Gūtara Oshōgatsu Setto" (Japanese: ぐーたらお正月セット)	January 3, 1986
Nobita wants to celebrate New Year by himself all alone without any intervention.
S26	"I Love Grandma"; Transliteration: "Obāchan Daisuki" (Japanese: おばあちゃん大好き)	January 3, 1986
A remake of "Memories of Grandma."
848	"The Time Receiver"; Transliteration: "Taimu Shībā" (Japanese: タイムシーバー)	January 10, 1986
A remake of "Antique Competition."
849	"The Substitution Rope"; Transliteration: "Irekae Rōpu" (Japanese: 入れかえロープ)	January 17, 1986
Shizuka wishes to be a boy so Nobita decides to swap bodies with her using Doraemon's substitution rope. While Shizuka enjoys her time in Nobita's body, Nobita finds it hard to live as Shizuka. In the end, they decide to switch back after Shizuka sees something she shouldn't as Nobita. (Not to be confused with a 1980 episode with a similar title)
850	"The Helping Bee"; Transliteration: "Nantokaba Chi" (Japanese: なんとかばち)	January 24, 1986
Nobita gets dirty due to Gian and Suneo's bullying, getting him in trouble with his mom. Not willing to let Nobita receive an unfair punishment, Doraemon brings out a Helping Bee to save Nobita from this predicament.
851	"Dad's a Mama's Boy, Too"; Transliteration: "Papa datte Amaenbo" (Japanese: パパだって甘えんぼ)	January 31, 1986
When Nobisuke comes home drunk after work, Doraemon and Nobita decide to bring him to the grandma of the past to give him some scolding.
852	"That Goodbye Through The Window"; Transliteration: "Ano Mado ni Sayōnara" (Japanese: あの窓にさようなら)	February 7, 1986
Nobita is bored because he can't go anywhere. Then Doraemon pulled out a gadget that can change the view of a Window.
853	"Invincible Fort"; Transliteration: "Muteki Hōdai" (Japanese: 無敵砲台)	February 14, 1986
Suneo asks Nobita to help him purchase a powerful gadget to get back at Gian. However, he soon becomes obsessed with the power and begins to abuse it. Remade as Suneo's Incredible Fort in the 2005 series.
854	"The Understanding Helmet"; Transliteration: "Satori Herumetto" (Japanese: さとりヘルメット)	February 21, 1986
Doraemon gives Nobita a mind reading helmet in order to avoid further beatings from Gian. However, Gian steals the helmet and now can read the minds of others, terrifying everyone.
855	"Police Dog Nose"; Transliteration: "Keisatsuken Tsukebana" (Japanese: 警察犬つけ鼻)	February 28, 1986
A mysterious man wants to record Gian's singing voice.
856	"The UFO Simulator"; Transliteration: "Enban-sō-jū Kunren-ki" (Japanese: 円盤そうじゅう訓練機)	March 7, 1986
857	"Space Exchanging Machine"; Transliteration: "Kūkan Irekae-ki" (Japanese: 空間入れかえ機)	March 14, 1986
858	"Emotion Energy Cylinder"; Transliteration: "Kanjō Enerugī Bonbe" (Japanese: 感情エネルギーボンベ)	March 21, 1986
859	"Time Glove and Glasses"; Transliteration: "Taimu Tebukuro to Megane" (Japanese: タイム手ぶくろとめがね)	March 28, 1986
860	"Welcome to Munichhausen Castle"; Transliteration: "Myunhihauzen Shiro e Yōkoso" (Japanese: ミュンヒハウゼン城へようこそ)	April 4, 1986
861	"The Lie Speaker"; Transliteration: "Atokara Honto Supīkā" (Japanese: アトカラホントスピーカー)	April 11, 1986
Doraemon introduces a Lie Speaker. When Nobita tells a lie into it, that lie will then become truth.
862	"Fourth Dimensional Dust Bin"; Transliteration: "Yo-jigen Kuzukago" (Japanese: 四次元くずかご)	April 18, 1986
Doraemon hides his Spare Pocket after getting tired of Nobita always using it without his permission. However, Nobita and Shizuka used its Fourth Dimensional Dust Bin as a substitute for sightseeing in the mountain.
863	"Chest Mushroom and Talking Lip"; Transliteration: "Mimidake to Shaberippu" (Japanese: ミミダケとシャベリップ)	April 25, 1986
864	"Uninhabited Drink"; Transliteration: "Mujinkyō Dorinku" (Japanese: 無人境ドリンク)	May 2, 1986
865	"Good Luck For The Disliked Test"; Transliteration: "Karaina Tesuto ni Gānba" (Japanese: きらいなテストにガーンバ)	May 9, 1986
866	"Secret Passage Pen"; Transliteration: "Nukeana Bōrupen" (Japanese: 抜け穴ボールペン)	May 16, 1986
Nobita uses Doraemon's Secret Passage Pen to create shortcuts to his room all around the neighborhood.
867	"Reverse Gravity Belt"; Transliteration: "Gyaku Jūryoku Beruto" (Japanese: 逆重力ベルト)	May 23, 1986
868	"Earth Creation Kit"; Transliteration: "Chikyū Seizō Setto" (Japanese: 地球製造セット)	May 30, 1986
A remake of "Creating the Earth."
869	"Star Making Hammer and Catching Net"; Transliteration: "Hoshi-tori Ami to Hanmā" (Japanese: 星とりあみとハンマー)	June 6, 1986
After hearing Gian and Suneo boosting about their stargazing experience, Doraemon and Nobita decide to create a starry sky at the Open Lot.
870	"Temporary Deposit Card"; Transliteration: "Ichiji Azuke Kādo" (Japanese: 一時あずけカード)	June 13, 1986
871	"A Magic Lamp Without Genie"; Transliteration: "Majin no Inai Mahō no Ranpu" (Japanese: 魔神のいない魔法のランプ)	June 20, 1986
872	"Fourth Dimension Rookie Badge"; Transliteration: "Yo-jigen Wakaba Māku" (Japanese: 四次元若葉マーク)	June 27, 1986
873	"Scenery Cutter"; Transliteration: "Keshiki Kattā" (Japanese: けしきカッター)	July 4, 1986
Nobita borrows a gadget from Doraemon to finish his drawing.
874	"Concrete Mirror"; Transliteration: "Gushō Kakyō" (Japanese: 具象化鏡)	July 11, 1986
875	"Miekake drop wood pen" Transliteration: "Miekake Ochi ga Ki Pen" (Japanese: みえかけ落がきペン)	July 18, 1986
876	"The Shifting Stick"; Transliteration: "Zurashinbo" (Japanese: ずらしんぼ)	July 25, 1986
877	"Tsubasa-chan's Secret"; Transliteration: "Tsubasa-chan no Himitsu" (Japanese: 翼ちゃんの秘密)	August 1, 1986
A photographer repeatedly tries to take a picture of Tsubasa-chan who secretly comes to visit her teacher who is ill. So, Doraemon and Nobita help Tsubasa-chan to meet her teacher without the photographer finding it out.
878	"Switching Gun"; Transliteration: "Tachiba Gan" (Japanese: タチバガン)	August 8, 1986
Not wanting to be bullied by Gian and Suneo anymore, Nobita uses the Switching Gun to exact revenge by getting them to be in his shoes.
879	"Feudal Lord of the 20th Century"; Transliteration: "20-Seiki no Oto no Sama" (Japanese: 20世紀のおとのさま)	August 15, 1986
A remake of "Feudal Lord Coming," and both would be remade in the 2005 series.
880	"Admission Ticket to Storyland"; Transliteration: "Meruhenrando Nyūjō-ken" (Japanese: メルヘンランド入場券)	August 22, 1986
The gang decides to have fun at Marchen Land.
881	"Nobita's Tough Decision"; Transliteration: "Nobita no Katāi Kesshin" (Japanese: のび太のカターイ決心)	August 29, 1986
A remake of "Goodbye, Shizuka."
882	"The Dream Director's Chair"; Transliteration: "Yume Kantoku Isu" (Japanese: ユメかんとくいす)	September 5, 1986
Suneo boats about having great dreams every night, so Doraemon and Nobita use a gadget to interfere with his dreams.
883	"Balloon Letter Controller"; Transliteration: "Fūsen Tegami Kontorōrā" (Japanese: 風船手紙コントローラー)	September 12, 1986
884	"Spying Vines"; Transliteration: "Hikari Faibā Tsuta" (Japanese: 光ファイバーつた)	September 19, 1986
With the help of Doraemon, Nobita uses the Spying Vines so he can play with Shizuka when she's home.
885	"Soap Helmet"; Transliteration: "Shabon Herumetto" (Japanese: シャボンヘルメット)	September 26, 1986
Doraemon gets Nobita to focus on his homework by spraying him with a Concentration Soap Helmet.
886	"A Preference Photo Printer"; Transliteration: "Okonomi Foto Purintā" (Japanese: おこのみフォトプリンター)	October 3, 1986
Nobita shows Suneo's photo to Doraemon, which has cropping out half of Nobita's body so that Suneo becomes the center of the attention. Doraemon bring out the Preference Photo Printer which is capable of correcting how the photo is taken.
887	"Handicap"; Transliteration: "Handikyappu" (Japanese: ハンディキャップ)	October 10, 1986
888	"Delivery Cap"; Transliteration: "Takuhai Kyappu" (Japanese: たくはいキャップ)	October 17, 1986
889	"Revenge Voucher"; Transliteration: "Shikaeshi Denpyō" (Japanese: しかえし伝票)	October 24, 1986
890	"The Video Phone"; Transliteration: "Tereterehon" (Japanese: テレテレホン)	October 31, 1986
891	"Practical Minicar Set"; Transliteration: "Jitsuyō Minikā Setto" (Japanese: 実用ミニカーセット)	November 7, 1986
892	"Lift Ski Pole"; Transliteration: "Rifuto Sutokku" (Japanese: リフトストック)	November 21, 1986
893	"Challenge Comet Hunter"; Transliteration: "Kometto Hantā ni Chōsen" (Japanese: コメットハンターに挑戦)	November 28, 1986
894	"Friendship Ring"; Transliteration: "Mikata Yubiwa" (Japanese: みかた指輪)	December 5, 1986
When Gian and Suneo steal Nobita's book, Doraemon gives him the friendship ring to have others help him out.
895	"Upgrading Potion"; Transliteration: "Gurēdo Appu Eki" (Japanese: グレードアップ液)	December 12, 1986
In order to read the just bought comic book, Nobita must finishes the homework first with a little help from Doraemon's gadget.
896	"Rebuild The Spell Shop"; Transliteration: "Tsuzure-ya o Tatenaose" (Japanese: つづれ屋をたてなおせ)	December 19, 1986
897	"Compression Pin"; Transliteration: "Atsumi Nukitori Bari" (Japanese: 厚みぬきとりバリ)	December 26, 1986
