= List of Doraemon (1979 TV series) episodes (1987–2005) =

This article lists television episodes and specials featuring the Japanese anime character Doraemon. There have been over 2,000 such episodes since the first full Doraemon episode was broadcast in April 1979.

== Series overview ==
Year	Episodes	Originally released	
Year	Episodes	First released	Last released
1979	235	April 2, 1979	December 31, 1979
1980	256	January 1, 1980	December 30, 1980
1981	152	January 1, 1981	December 25, 1981
1982	49	January 1, 1982	December 24, 1982
1983	52	January 1, 1983	December 30, 1983
1984	51	January 1, 1984	December 28, 1984
1985	52	January 1, 1985	December 27, 1985
1986	50	January 3, 1986	December 26, 1986
1987	60	January 2, 1987	December 25, 1987
1988	49	January 8, 1988	December 23, 1988
1989	54	January 6, 1989	December 29, 1989
1990	50	January 5, 1990	December 28, 1990
1991	51	January 4, 1991	December 27, 1991
1992	55	January 10, 1992	December 25, 1992
1993	70	January 8, 1993	December 24, 1993
1994	51	January 7, 1994	December 23, 1994
1995	48	January 6, 1995	December 22, 1995
1996	48	January 5, 1996	December 21, 1996
1997	51	January 10, 1997	December 23, 1997
1998	44	January 9, 1998	December 18, 1998
1999	45	January 8, 1999	December 31, 1999
2000	40	January 14, 2000	December 15, 2000
2001	41	January 12, 2001	December 14, 2001
2002	45	January 11, 2002	December 31, 2002
2003	45	January 17, 2003	December 12, 2003
2004	38	January 9, 2004	December 18, 2004
2005	10	January 7, 2005	March 18, 2005

== 1987 ==
No.	Title	Original release date
S27	"Stray Dog Ichi's Country"; Transliteration: "Nora Inu 「Ichi」no Kuni" (Japanese: のら犬「イチ」の国)	January 2, 1987
898	"The Audio Speaker Phone"; Transliteration: "Fukikae Itodenwa" (Japanese: ふきかえ糸電話)	January 9, 1987
Nobita, having scored zero marks and with the teacher wanting to talk with Mom about that, uses the Audio Speaker Phone to make the teacher say nice things about him to his mother.
899	"Skywalk Shoes"; Transliteration: "Kūchū Shūzu" (Japanese: 空中シューズ)	January 16, 1987
900	"Dream-scape Chip"; Transliteration: "Yume Kanketsu Chippu" (Japanese: ユメ完結チップ)	January 23, 1987
901	"Monster ball" Transliteration: "Monsutā Bōru" (Japanese: モンスターボール)	January 30, 1987
902	"The Opposite World Mirror"; Transliteration: "Abekobe Sekai Mirā" (Japanese: あべこべせかいミラー)	February 6, 1987
Nobita is sick of being picked on by Gian and Suneo, so he gets Doraemon to show him an alternate world in which he is the neighborhood bully, but bully Nobita escapes into the real world.
903	"Nobita's Secret Base"; Transliteration: "Nobita no Himitsu Kichi" (Japanese: のび太の秘密基地)	February 13, 1987
Doraemon uses a blueprint paper, subway construction machine and construction tank to construct a secret place for Nobita. But in the end, Tamako learns about his secret and scolds him, and makes him study.
904	"Petter"; Transliteration: "Pettā" (Japanese: ペッター)	February 20, 1987
905	"Age-Changing Pool Rope"; Transliteration: "Toshi no Izumi Rōpu" (Japanese: としのいずみロープ)	February 27, 1987
Doraemon gives Nobita a gadget that lets a person grows and shrinks after drinking a special red/blue water.
906	"Memories of the Red Shoe"; Transliteration: "Akai Kutsu no Omoide" (Japanese: 赤いクツの思い出)	March 6, 1987
A remake of "The Girl With the Red Shoes."
907	"Date-Changing Chalk"; Transliteration: "Hizuke Henkō Chokku" (Japanese: 日付変更チョーク)	March 13, 1987
Doraemon and Nobita use date changing chalk to enter the past. Nobita also goes into the future and meets the future Nobita. As Tamako rubs off the chalk, the present Nobita uses the time machine and returns home.
908	"That Day, That Time, and That Daruma"; Transliteration: "Ano Michi Ano Toki Ano Daruma" (Japanese: あの日あの時あのダルマ)	March 20, 1987
On a dark day, Nobita feels dead and Doraemon tries to help him.
909	"Cherry-blossom viewing at midnight" Transliteration: "Mayonaka no Ohanami" (Japanese: 真夜中のお花見)	March 27, 1987
910	"Nobita the Gunfighter"; Transliteration: "Ganfaitā Nobita" (Japanese: ガンファイターのび太)	April 3, 1987
911	"Holographic Machine"; Transliteration: "Horogura-ki" (Japanese: ホログラ機)	April 10, 1987
Doraemon uses the holograph machine over Nobita to make him easily pass through anything. But, Nobita misuses the gadget. As the gadget gets spoilt, Nobita fails to return to normal and remains hungry.
912	"The Woodcutter's Spring"; Transliteration: "Kikori no Izumi" (Japanese: 木こりの泉)	April 17, 1987
Doraemon tells Nobita about the woodcutter, who was gifted with a gold and silver axe by an angel for speaking the truth. However, Suneo and Gian get into trouble as they act greedy.
913	"Plants Promenade Liquid"; Transliteration: "Shokubutsu Arukase Eki" (Japanese: 植物歩かせ液)	April 24, 1987
Doraemon uses the plant walking potion to make the tree walk out of the place it has been planted, so that it can be saved from being cut by Nobita's school staff.
914	"Repli-Chicken"; Transliteration: "Repuri-kokko" (Japanese: レプリコッコ)	May 1, 1987
Doraemon uses the replica chicken to hatch a replica of comic books and gifts. Later, Suneo and Gian show the chicken a picture of the dinosaur from the TV and falls in trouble when it hatches a dinosaur.
915	"Popping Basement"; Transliteration: "Poppu Chikashitsu to Fueru Mirā" (Japanese: ポップ地下室とフエルミラー)	May 8, 1987
Doraemon and Nobita create a train model with the help of the gadgets. But Suneo refuses to sit in it because of his ego. Later, Suneo forgets about his ego and saves his friends from a mishap.
916	"No Umbrella"; Transliteration: "Kaseirazu" (Japanese: カサイラズ)	May 15, 1987
As Nobita doesn't have an umbrella, Doraemon sprays an invisible umbrella liquid over him. Then, Nobita uses the spray on his friends; as a result, they fail to step into the water and take bath.
917	"Clone Kid Goku"; Transliteration: "Kurōnri Kiddo Gokū" (Japanese: クローンリキッド悟空)	May 22, 1987
Nobita creates clones of himself to fight Gian with the help of Doraemon's cloning liquid, but the clones get scared of Gian. Later, Nobita uses Gian's mother's clones to teach Gian a lesson.
918	"Programming mole" Transliteration: "Puroguramingu Hokuro" (Japanese: プログラミングほくろ)	May 29, 1987
As Nobita gets jealous of Suneo's robot, Doraemon gives Nobita the human programming moles to get his work done by the others. Nobita sets the moles on his friends and himself to complete his work.
919	"Tincture"; Transliteration: "Tatari Chinki" (Japanese: たたりチンキ)	June 5, 1987
Doraemon uses a curse tincture to scare Gian with a phantom cat as Gian hates cats, and Nobita uses the curse tincture to scare his mother with a phantom book. Then, Nobita uses the curse tincture on himself to scare the teacher. But instead, the teacher scolds Nobita's phantom in the end. Remade as The Fear of Tincture in the 2005 series.
920	"Diorama book" Transliteration: "Jiorama Bukku" (Japanese: ジオラマブック)	June 12, 1987
Doraemon uses animal rearing diorama book and season controller to speed up the growth of the frogs and insects given by Suneo, Gian and Shizuka, to help Nobita complete his science journal.
921	"Traffic Sign Sticker"; Transliteration: "Kōtsū Hyōshiki Sutekkā" (Japanese: 交通標識ステッカー)	June 19, 1987
Nobita uses Doraemon's traffic sign stickers on Gian so that he doesn't hurt anyone. Gian's mother, his teacher and a dog pounce on Gian because of the danger sticker.
922	"Pursuing Arrow"; Transliteration: "Tsuiseki Arō" (Japanese: ついせきアロー)	June 26, 1987
Nobita uses Doraemon's pursuing arrow gadget to keep a track on Gian and stay away from him. To save Nobita, Doraemon uses the replacement rope and replaces Gian's mother with Nobita. In the end, Gian's mother scolds Gian.
923	"Wish Tanabata Rocket"; Transliteration: "Negai Tanabata Roketto" (Japanese: ねがい七夕ロケット)	July 3, 1987
Nobita, Suneo and Gian write opposite of what they wish for on the Tanabata wish rocket. Later, Doraemon reveals that he had changed the wish rocket, and that their wishes will come true.
924	"Fix and Unfix Plaster"; Transliteration: "Naoshiban to Kowashiban" (Japanese: なおしバンとこわしバン)	July 10, 1987
Suneo gives Nobita his old toys. So, Doraemon uses the fix-it bandage and repairs the toys. Then, Suneo forcefully takes the toys from Nobita and pastes the break it bandages on it, which creates an explosion.
925	"Exaggerating Camera!"; Transliteration: "Ōgesa Kamera" (Japanese: 大げさカメラ)	July 17, 1987
Doraemon uses an exaggeration camera and clicks many pictures of Nobita to shock Nobita's friends. But he gets himself into trouble when Gian and Suneo learn the truth.
926	"Courage Testing Glasses"; Transliteration: "Kimodameshi Megane" (Japanese: きもだめしメガネ)	July 24, 1987
Gian, Suneo and Nobita play the scaredy-cat dare game. Gian wears the spectacles and scares people with his voice. But, a glimpse of his mother through the spectacles scares him away.
927	"Soak-up Straw"; Transliteration: "Nakami Suitōru" (Japanese: ナカミスイトール)	July 31, 1987
Nobita, unknowingly, presses the trigger and sucks Gian into a gadget when he chases him and Doraemon. Later, when Nobita presses the trigger again, Gian comes out naked from the gadget.
928	"Thrill ticket" Transliteration: "Suriru Chiketto" (Japanese: スリルチケット)	August 7, 1987
Doraemon gives Nobita thrill tickets to stay cool. Nobita gives the tickets to his friends to feel the thrill. At the end, Nobita uses the last ticket with 5 marks on it and gets himself into trouble.
929	"Go! Go! Nobitaman"; Transliteration: "GO! GO! Nobitaman" (Japanese: GO！GO！ノビタマン)	August 14, 1987
930	"Blackhole Pen"; Transliteration: "Burakku Hōru Pen" (Japanese: ブラックホールペン)	August 21, 1987
Nobita uses the black hole pen white hole pen to impress Shizuka, but loses the white hole pen. Tamako and Doraemon fall into the black hole, and pop out when the teacher writes a zero on Nobita's test paper with the pen.
931	"Weight Sucking Gun"; Transliteration: "Omosa Suikomi Jū" (Japanese: 重さすいこみ銃)	August 28, 1987
932	"Punctual Ghost"; Transliteration: "Obake Taimā" (Japanese: オバケタイマー)	September 4, 1987
Doraemon uses a ghostly timer to wake Nobita. Nobita places the clock in Gian's room to scare him. But Gian uses it to reach school on time. Then, Nobita regrets giving Gian the gadget.
933	"Shut up, Giant!"; Transliteration: "Jaian o Damarasero" (Japanese: ジャイアンをだまらせろ)	September 11, 1987
Doraemon gives Nobita an okay stick gadget to stop a person from shouting. But Suneo takes the gadget from Nobita and uses it calm Gian's anger. However, Gian's anger piles up, and blasts on Suneo.
934	"Traffic Regulating Timer"; Transliteration: "Kōtsū Kisei Taimā" (Japanese: 交通規制タイマー)	September 18, 1987
As the playground is occupied with construction materials, Doraemon uses traffic control timer to vacant the road for an hour, for the kids to play. But it results in heavy traffic in the city.
935	"Lost in My House!"; Transliteration: "Ie no Naka de Maigo" (Japanese: 家の中で迷子)	September 25, 1987
On Nobita's insistence, Doraemon uses the home maze gadget to reshape the house. But, Nobita turns the house into a difficult maze. Then, Nobisuke turns the gadget and gets it back to what it was earlier.
936	"Welcome to Pawnshop"; Transliteration: "Yōkoso Shichiya e" (Japanese: ようこそ質屋へ)	October 2, 1987
Nobita mortgages his unwanted things through Doraemon's automatic pawn shop machine and purchases a comic book. Later, he helps a poor artist sell his painting and get money in return.
937	"Time Capsule"; Transliteration: "Taimu Kapuseru" (Japanese: タイムカプセル)	October 9, 1987
A crisis arises in the future, forcing the future characters to seek help from their past counterparts. Remade as Nobita's 100 Point Test - A Major Incident After 25 Years in the 2005 series.
938	"Don't Cry, Beso!!"; Transliteration: "Nakuna, Beso!!" (Japanese: 泣くな，ベソ!!)	October 23, 1987
Nobita places a getaway leaf on a pet dog, Beso who has been treated badly by his master. Beso gets transformed and enjoys himself. In the evening, he returns and forgives his master for his behavior.
939	"Wire Pulling Microphone"; Transliteration: "Kokoro Fukikomi Maiku" (Japanese: 心ふきこみマイク)	October 23, 1987
Nobita uses Doraemon's behavior modification microphone to make Gian apologize to him for his behavior. Later, Doraemon uses the gadget against Nobita so that he studies, and keeps taunting him until dawn.
940	"I Wish I Could Go Back!"; Transliteration: "Ano Goro ni Modori Tai!" (Japanese: あの頃に戻りたい！)	October 30, 1987
Doraemon uses a soul time machine to help Nobita's soul get back into his childhood days for some time, as he wishes. After returning, Nobita realizes that his mother cares for him.
941	"Communication pills" Transliteration: "Tsūkā Jō" (Japanese: ツーカー錠)	October 30, 1987
Doraemon uses a watcha macalate pill to clear the communication gap between Tamako and Nobisuke. Later, Nobita uses the pill on Dekisugi and Shizuka to make their communication easy with him.
942	"Papa and Grandpa"; Transliteration: "Papa to Ojī-chan" (Japanese: パパとおじいちゃん)	November 6, 1987
Nobisuke gets a dream, in which Nobiru tells him to be strict with Nobita. Then, Nobita and Doraemon enter the past through the time machine, and complain to Nobiru about Nobisuke.
943	"Shadow Releaser"; Transliteration: "Kagefumi Oiru" (Japanese: かげふみオイル)	November 6, 1987
Doraemon drops the shadow stepping oil on Gian's shadow and attacks him. But when Gian realizes their mischief and shouts at them, a truck heads towards Gian. So, Gian runs and saves himself.
944	"Fellowship badge" Transliteration: "Nakama Bacchi" (Japanese: なかまバッチ)	November 13, 1987
Doraemon gives Nobita buddy badges to find a friend who will save him. Nobita's badge gets into Gian's hand. Later, they both become good friends and save each other in time of trouble.
945	"Trip Cloud"; Transliteration: "Hanbun Odekake Gumo" (Japanese: 半分おでかけ雲)	November 13, 1987
Nobita uses Doraemon's half out cloud maker and cloud mix and goes to the mountain with his friends. Tamako gets angry and leaves the cloud in the air. And Nobita falls from the cloud into the water.
946	"Human remote controller" Transliteration: "Ningen Rimokon" (Japanese: 人間リモコン)	November 20, 1987
Doraemon gives Nobita a human remote controller for his benefit. However, Nobita presses the stop button by mistake and freezes in one position until night. But, Doraemon brings him home.
947	"See the World through Windows"; Transliteration: "Ryokō Mado Setto" (Japanese: 旅行窓セット)	November 20, 1987
Doraemon uses a travel window set and takes Nobita to the places his friends are holidaying in. Nobita clicks his friends' pictures in awkward poses. Later, he shows them their pictures and embarrasses them.
948	"While you are asleep" Transliteration: "Nenagara Kēsu" (Japanese: ねながらケース)	November 27, 1987
Nobita uses the sleeping case gadget and takes Suneo's video game, but breaks the game controller. So, he uses the sleeping case again and apologizes to Suneo in his sleep.
949	"Mr. Smoke"; Transliteration: "Mokumokuman" (Japanese: モクモクマン)	November 27, 1987
Gian holds Nobita back to complete his housework. So, Doraemon gives Nobita a smoke man production bottle to create a smoke man that will complete the housework.
950	"Invisible Bodyguard"; Transliteration: "Tōmei Bodīgādo" (Japanese: 透明ボディーガード)	December 4, 1987
Doraemon brings an invisible bodyguard plastic model from the future store. Nobita assembles the bodyguard without reading the manual properly, and gets into trouble when the bodyguard follows him everywhere and hurts others.
951	"Transformation Robot"; Transliteration: "Henshin Robotto" (Japanese: へんしんロボット)	December 4, 1987
Nobita feeds cottage cheese to a copy robot and sends it to beat Gian. On his way, the robot eats the cottage cheese from Shizuka's bag and takes her look. Then, the robot beats Gian because he troubles Nobita.
952	"Perfect Fixer"; Transliteration: "Kanzen Shūsei-ki" (Japanese: 完全修正機)	December 11, 1987
Doraemon uses the complete makeover machine to change the look of his picture. Nobita uses the gadget to transform other's picture and his essay as well. But the picture fades.
953	"Look-alike Balloon"; Transliteration: "Ayatsuri Sokkuti Fūsen" (Japanese: あやつりそっくり風船)	December 11, 1987
As it is cold, Nobita creates a balloon replica of himself and sends it out for a stroll. Nobita sees his replica through a mirror. Unaware of the fact that Shizuka is present there, he opens his pant zip to pee.
954	"Vehicle Shoes"; Transliteration: "Norimono Kutsu" (Japanese: のりものぐつ)	December 18, 1987
Suneo takes Gian and Shizuka for a ride in his uncle's sports car and refuses Nobita to come along. So, Doraemon and Nobita use a shoe transporter and go for a ride.
955	"Ordering Gun"; Transliteration: "Meirei Jū" (Japanese: めいれい銃)	December 18, 1987
Nobita takes a command gun from Doraemon and shoots people for fun. So, Doraemon takes the gadget quietly from him and shoots him and makes him clean the lawn.
956	"Time Skipping Pulley"; Transliteration: "Taimu Wāpu Rīru" (Japanese: タイムワープリール)	December 25, 1987
Nobita gets curious to know about his Christmas present. So, he uses Doraemon's time swap reel to skip the time. He reaches quite ahead in the future and gets back into the present only after breaking the gadget. Remade as My Birthday's The Same As Always in the 2005 series.
957	"Magic Baton"; Transliteration: "Museibutsu Shikibō" (Japanese: むせいぶつ指揮棒)	December 25, 1987
As the weather is too cold and as Tamako requests Nobita to clean the garden and go shopping, Doraemon uses the inanimate baton to bring life into non-living things to get the work done.

== 1988 ==
No.	Title	Original release date
958	"Treasure Hunting Paper"; Transliteration: "Takara Sagashi Pēpā" (Japanese: たからさがしペーパー)	January 8, 1988
Doraemon and Nobita use the treasure hunting paper to find theirs and Suneo's New Year gift and also to know about Nobirou's location through a puzzle.
959	"No Sleepy"; Transliteration: "Nomuke Suitōru" (Japanese: ネムケスイトール)	January 15, 1988
To keep Nobita awake, Doraemon uses the sleepiness soaker and soaks Nobita's sleep. But, Nobita presses the trigger and puts Doraemon, Tamako, Gian and Suneo's mother to sleep.
960	"Pet Paint"; Transliteration: "Petto Penki" (Japanese: ペットペンキ)	January 22, 1988
As Nobita's wishes for a pet, Doraemon uses the pet paint to bring life into stones. Nobita's pet dog breaks Gian's dog's teeth. Hence, Gian paints a huge stone to hurt him. But Doraemon washes off the paint.
961	"Tarzan Underwear"; Transliteration: "Tāzan Pantsu" (Japanese: ターザンパンツ)	January 29, 1988
Doraemon gives Nobita Tarzan pants and Tarzan rope so that he can easily communicate with the animals. Nobita bravely communicates with the lioness and sends her back to the forest.
962	"Rain-Maker Pen Set"; Transliteration: "Amedasu Pen" (Japanese: アメダスペン)	February 5, 1988
Nobita uses the rain-maker pen set and creates snow in the park. But Gian and Suneo capture the place. Doraemon gets very angry and uses the gadget against them. At the end, they all get stuck in a storm.
963	"Sixth Sense Alarm"; Transliteration: "Mushi no Shirase" (Japanese: 虫のしらせ)	February 12, 1988
Nobita reads his horoscope and feels happy as things go as per the prediction in the horoscope. But later, he realizes that it was last week's horoscope.
964	"Package for Fishing in the Air"; Transliteration: "Kūchū Tsuri Setto" (Japanese: 空中つりセット)	February 19, 1988
Gian's dog robs Tamako's friend's shoe from the house. So, Doraemon uses the cloud boat and fishing rod to get hold of the thief.
965	"Elevating Button"; Transliteration: "Erebēto・Batan" (Japanese: エレベート・ボタン)	February 26, 1988
Doraemon uses the elevating button to climb up and get the ball back. Later, Nobita and Shizuka use the gadget and takes all the children up in the sky to play to avoid scolding from their elders.
966	"Chroma Key Set"; Transliteration: "Kuroma Kī Setto" (Japanese: クロマキーセット)	March 4, 1988
Doraemon tells Nobita about the chroma key set technique. Nobita uses the projector to project Doraemon as a huge starfish badger and himself as the savior, who saves Shizuka.
967	"Magnifying Spec"; Transliteration: "Ōkiku Naru Mushi Megane" (Japanese: 大きくなる虫メガネ)	March 11, 1988
Doraemon uses a magnifying glass and expands Nobita's car. Gian and Suneo use the gadget over their robot, which creates a havoc. So Doraemon uses the small light over the robot.
968	"Help Capsules"; Transliteration: "Tasukeron・Kapuseru" (Japanese: タスケロン・カプセル)	March 18, 1988
Doraemon gives Nobita help capsules so that he never fails to help others. Gian and Suneo feed Nobita all the capsules. After that, Nobita spends his day helping others. Shizuka promises to help Nobita in his homework.
969	"Traffic Lights in-My-Pocket"; Transliteration: "Poketto Shingōki" (Japanese: ポケット信号機)	March 25, 1988
Nobita uses a pocket traffic light and troubles Gian, Suneo, Shizuka, Tamako and a street dog. Gian and Suneo use Doraemon's emergency helmets to make the pocket traffic light ineffective. At the end, they along with Shizuka and Tamako chase after Nobita to teach him a lesson.
970	"Wish Straws"; Transliteration: "Warashibe ni Onegai" (Japanese: ワラシベにお願い)	April 1, 1988
S28	"Around the World in an Aerostat!"; Transliteration: "Kikyū de Sekai Isshū o!" (Japanese: 気球で世界一周を！)	April 5, 1988
971	"Almighty Vision"; Transliteration: "Dansō Bijon" (Japanese: 断層ビジョン)	April 8, 1988
Doraemon uses a gadget to find the exact location of Nobita's savings dug underground. Later, Doraemon and Nobita find a man frozen in the ice of the Himalayan region through the gadget and save him. Remade as Look at it! Fault Vision in the 2005 series.
972	"Chair Improver"; Transliteration: "Isu Kairyō-ki" (Japanese: イス改良機)	April 15, 1988
Nobita promises Doraemon that he will study diligently but falls asleep and blames the chair for his behavior. So, Doraemon uses a chair modifier to keep him alert.
973	"Ultra Farsighted Mirror"; Transliteration: "Ensha Kagami" (Japanese: 遠写かがみ)	April 22, 1988
Doraemon and Nobita use the broadcast mirror to advertise a small sweet shop. At first, the advertisement fails to attract customers. But later, a huge crowd gets attracted to the sweet shop.
974	"Image Beret"; Transliteration: "Imēji・Berē" (Japanese: イメージ・ベレー)	April 29, 1988
Doraemon uses an image wear it gadget to create a look-alike model of Shizuka. Later, Nobita uses the gadget to trouble Gian, Suneo, Shizuka, and Doraemon.
975	"Make Your Own Diorama"; Transliteration: "Jitsubun Jiorama" (Japanese: 実物ジオラマ)	May 6, 1988
Nobita meets Shizuka and shows off his flying skills using the real life diorama. But Doraemon panics after seeing a rat and throws the diorama stick. After which, Nobita gets stuck on a pole and cries.
976	"Helping Dumpling"; Transliteration: "Otasuke Dango" (Japanese: おたすけだんご)	May 20, 1988
Gian beats Nobita for a silly reason. So, Doraemon gives Nobita a set of dumplings to protect him. Nobita throws a dumpling on Gian. But unfortunately, Nobita gets trapped into his own plan.
977	"Papa's Present"; Transliteration: "Papa no Omiyage" (Japanese: パパのおみやげ)	May 27, 1988
Nobita gives his friends gifts in the hope of getting a video game in return through the gift wrapping cloth. But, Suneo loses the cloth. Later, Nobisuke finds the cloth and gets a video game for Nobita.
978	"Give-Me-Gloves"; Transliteration: "Chōdai Hando" (Japanese: チョーダイハンド)	June 3, 1988
Doraemon uses the hand it over gadget on Gian to get Nobita's book back. Then, Nobita uses the gadget to get gifts from all his friends. But later, he realizes his mistake and returns the gifts.
979	"Invisible Gloves"; Transliteration: "Tōmei Hando" (Japanese: 透明ハンド)	June 10, 1988
Nobita takes an invisible glove from Doraemon and troubles Suneo, Gian, Shizuka, and Dekisugi. But Tamako gets to know about Nobita's mischief and pulls his ear with the help of another invisible glove that she took earlier.
980	"Warp Pen"; Transliteration: "Wāpu Pen" (Japanese: ワープペン)	June 17, 1988
Doraemon uses a warp pen to get groceries. Gian learns about the gadget and draws holes everywhere in Nobita's room to watch animals but loses the warp eraser. A lion pops out and scares everyone.
981	"Cordless Cordphone"; Transliteration: "Itonashi Itodenwa" (Japanese: 糸なし糸電話)	June 24, 1988
Nobita gives Shizuka's one part of the stringless string phone and returns home to tell her a joke through the phone. But when he calls up Shizuka, he forgets what the joke was.
982	"Tripping Gas"; Transliteration: "Subēru Gasu" (Japanese: スベールガス)	July 8, 1988
Doraemon, Nobita, and Shizuka use a sliding spray to slide from a mountain. Gian and Suneo use the spray all over their body and find it difficult to even walk straight.
983	"Silhouette Flash"; Transliteration: "Kagebōshi Furasshu" (Japanese: かげぼうしフラッシュ)	July 15, 1988
984	"Memories Colon"; Transliteration: "Omoide Koron" (Japanese: オモイデコロン)	July 22, 1988
985	"The Seawater Controller"; Transliteration: "Kaisui Kontorōrā" (Japanese: 海水コントローラー)	July 29, 1988
986	"Anything Pilot"; Transliteration: "Nan demo Sōjū-ki" (Japanese: なんでも操縦機)	August 5, 1988
987	"Treasure of the Shinugumi Mountain"; Transliteration: "Shinigami Yama no Takaramono" (Japanese: 死神山の宝物)	August 12, 1988
988	"The Snooze Sticker"; Transliteration: "Inemori Shīru" (Japanese: いねむりシール)	August 19, 1988
Nobita sees Doraemon wearing The Snooze Sticker, and eye gadget that lets him sleep while maintaining the illusion of being awake.
989	"A Mirage Candle"; Transliteration: "Shinki Rōsoku Tate" (Japanese: しんきろうそく立て)	August 26, 1988
990	"Bug Marker"; Transliteration: "Konchū Mākā" (Japanese: 昆虫マーカー)	September 2, 1988
991	"The Ancestor Who Came"; Transliteration: "Yattekita Gosenzo-sama" (Japanese: やってきた御先祖様)	September 9, 1988
992	"High-Rail Paper"; Transliteration: "Hai-Rēru Pēpā" (Japanese: ハイレールペーパー)	September 16, 1988
993	"Fine Wrinkle Cup of Each Content"; Transliteration: "Nakami Goto Bichijimi Kappu" (Japanese: 中味ごとのびちぢみカップ)	September 23, 1988
994	"Nobita the Fencing Master"; Transliteration: "Kengō Nobita" (Japanese: 剣豪のび太)	September 30, 1988
995	"Fortune Telling Card"; Transliteration: "Uranai Kādo Bokkusu" (Japanese: 占いカードボックス)	October 7, 1988
Nobita uses Doraemon's gadget to decide whether he should go fishing with Suneo or visit Shizuka.
996	"Inclination Mirror-II"; Transliteration: "Hairikomi Mirā-II" (Japanese: 入りこみミラーII)	October 14, 1988
Nobita wants to learn how to drive a car without getting a driving license. He gets Doraemon to take out another mirror to go to the Mirror World and practice driving, only this time, any action in the Mirror World will be reflected in the real world.
997	"Sweet Straw"; Transliteration: "Tatsumaki Sutorō" (Japanese: たつまきストロー)	October 21, 1988
998	"Helicamera"; Transliteration: "Herikamera" (Japanese: ヘリカメラ)	October 28, 1988
999	"Marionetter"; Transliteration: "Marionettā" (Japanese: マリオネッター)	November 4, 1988
1000	"Chameleon Tea"; Transliteration: "Kamereon-cha" (Japanese: カメレオンちゃ)	November 11, 1988
Doraemon gives Nobita Chameleon Tea. Nobita drinks the tea and changes color to match his surroundings and becomes invisible to avoid people.
1001	"Trampolinegen"; Transliteration: "Toranporingen" (Japanese: トランポリンゲン)	November 18, 1988
1002	"Induction Foot Stamp"; Transliteration: "Yūdō Ashiato Sutanpu" (Japanese: ゆうどう足あとスタンプ)	November 25, 1988
1003	"Photo Chamber"; Transliteration: "Shashin Shabēru" (Japanese: 写真シャベール)	December 2, 1988
1004	"Time Room (episode)" Transliteration: "Taimu・Rūmu" (Japanese: タイム・ルーム)	December 9, 1988
1005	"Instant Iwanomoto"; Transliteration: "Sokuseki Iwamoto" (Japanese: 即席イワノモト)	December 16, 1988
1006	"Foolproof Safety Umbrella"; Transliteration: "Zettai Anzen Kasa" (Japanese: ぜったいあんぜんかさ)	December 23, 1988
Nobita faces a lot of unfortunate incidents. So, Doraemon hands over Nobita a foolproof safety umbrella to be safe under any circumstances. However, Nobita picks the wrong umbrella and gets a beating from Suneo and Gian.

== 1989 ==
No.	Title	Original release date
1007	"The kite which flies the person" Transliteration: "Agerare Tako" (Japanese: あげられタコ)	January 6, 1989
1008	"Set Maker"; Transliteration: "Setto Mēkā" (Japanese: セットメーカー)	January 13, 1989
1009	"Radio-Controller Antenna"; Transliteration: "Rajikon Antena" (Japanese: ラジコンアンテナ)	January 20, 1989
1010	"The "Out with the Demons" Beans"; Transliteration: "Oni wa Soto Bīnzu" (Japanese: 鬼は外ビーンズ)	January 27, 1989
Doraemon introduces "Out with the Demons" Beans which are used to transfer things and people from one place to another.
1011	"Time Dreamer"; Transliteration: "Taimu Dorīmā" (Japanese: タイムドリーマー)	February 3, 1989
Doraemon gives Nobita a dream-related gadget, but a gadget thinks a dream will come true, Doraemon thinks not well.
1012	"Landboat On Land" (Japanese: 陸上ボート)	February 10, 1989
1013	"Anime Box"; Transliteration: "Anime Bako" (Japanese: アニメばこ)	February 17, 1989
Suneo shows Shizuka and Gian the anime adaptation of the manga Super Koala, so Nobita pleads Doraemon to give him a gadget to convert manga books into anime. Doraemon takes out the Anime Box so they can convert the Super Koala manga into anime.
1014	"Telephoto Megaphone"; Transliteration: "Bōen Megafon" (Japanese: 望遠メガフォン)	February 24, 1989
1015	"Anything Airport"; Transliteration: "Nan demo Kūkō" (Japanese: なんでも空港)	March 3, 1989
1016	"Animal Finger Cap"; Transliteration: "Dōbutsu Yubi Kyappu" (Japanese: どうぶつ指キャップ)	March 10, 1989
1017	"The Flashlight of Surprises"; Transliteration: "Goroawasetō" (Japanese: ゴロアワセトウ)	March 17, 1989
1018	"A Mysterious Prophecy"; Transliteration: "Nazo no Yogen-sho" (Japanese: ナゾの予言書)	March 24, 1989
1019	"A Challenging Typewriter"; Transliteration: "Kikigaki Taipuraitā" (Japanese: ききがきタイプライター)	March 31, 1989
1020	"Nobita and the balloon raft" Transliteration: "Nobita to Fūsen Ikada" (Japanese: のび太と風船イカダ)	April 7, 1989
1021	"Gigantic Stereoscopic Television"; Transliteration: "Chō Kyodai Rittai Terebi" (Japanese: 超巨大立体テレビ)	April 14, 1989
1022	"Actual Miniature Replica Encyclopedia"; Transliteration: "Jitsubutsu Minicha Dai Hyakka" (Japanese: 実物ミニチュア大百科)	April 21, 1989
1023	"Zangbow"; Transliteration: "Zangubō" (Japanese: ザンゲボウ)	April 28, 1989
1024	"Romance in the Snowy Mountain"; Transliteration: "Yukiyama no Purezento" (Japanese: 雪山のプレゼント)	May 5, 1989
A remake of a 1980 episode.
1025	"Take the Nature to the Room"; Transliteration: "Heya ni Shizen o" (Japanese: へやに自然を)	May 5, 1989
1026	"Apartment Pretend"; Transliteration: "Apāto Gokko" (Japanese: アパートごっこ)	May 5, 1989
A remake of "The Apartment Tree".
1027	"Uninhabited Island is my Island"; Transliteration: "Mujin Dō wa Boku no Shima" (Japanese: 無人島はボクの島)	May 5, 1989
1028	"Good Combo Selection Comb Board"; Transliteration: "Ii Toko-sen Takushi Bōdo" (Japanese: いいとこ選たくしボード)	May 12, 1989
1029	"Automatic Bunching Gas"; Transliteration: "Jidō Bun'naguri Gasu" (Japanese: 自動ぶんなぐりガス)	May 19, 1989
1030	"Mini TV Station"; Transliteration: "Mini・Terebi Kyoku" (Japanese: ミニ・テレビ局)	May 26, 1989
1031	"Shadow Bunting and Shadow Incarnation Liquid"; Transliteration: "Kage Bun-chin to Kage Jittai-Ka-eki" (Japanese: 影ぶんちんと影実体化液)	June 2, 1989
1032	"Comfortable Mountain-Climbing Hat"; Transliteration: "Rakuraku Tozan Bō" (Japanese: らくらく登山帽)	June 9, 1989
1033	"Shikamonokake Shrine"; Transliteration: "Tachimonokake Jinja" (Japanese: 断ち物願かけ神社)	June 16, 1989
1034	"Specimen Collection Box"; Transliteration: "Hyōhan Saisho Gako" (Japanese: 標本さいしゅう箱)	June 23, 1989
1035	"Commercial Candy Launcher"; Transliteration: "CM Kyandē Hassha-ki" (Japanese: CMキャンデー発射機)	June 30, 1989
1036	"Free Size Doll Camera"; Transliteration: "Furī Saizu Nuigurumi Kamera" (Japanese: フリーサイズぬいぐるみカメラ)	July 7, 1989
Nobita borrows Doraemon's gadget, the Free-Size Toy Camera to transform into Shizuka. Remade as Nobita Becomes Shizuka-chan in the 2005 series.
1037	"Dream Hole"; Transliteration: "Yume Hōru" (Japanese: 夢ホール)	July 14, 1989
1038	"The Human Piggy Bank"; Transliteration: "Ningen Chokin Bako Seizō-ki" (Japanese: 人間貯金箱製造機)	July 21, 1989
Doraemon gives Nobita 22nd-Century Piggy Banks such as the Hypnosis Bank that hypnotizes someone who goes near there. The Puzzle Bank in which people have to solve a hard puzzle to get the money and the Guard Dog Bank guarded by a dog.
1039	"The Shell Set"; Transliteration: "Sōnara Kai Setto" (Japanese: そうなる貝セット)	July 28, 1989
1040	"The Self Alarm"; Transliteration: "Serufu Arāmu" (Japanese: セルフアラーム)	August 4, 1989
1041	"Makeover Ring and Card"; Transliteration: "Henshin Ringu to Kādo" (Japanese: 変身リングとカード)	August 11, 1989
1042	"Dorami-Type Mini Hot-Air Balloon"; Transliteration: "Dorami-gata Mini Netsukikyū" (Japanese: ドラミ型ミニ熱気球)	August 18, 1989
1043	"Decoy Cases"; Transliteration: "Otori Kēsu" (Japanese: おとりケース)	August 25, 1989
1044	"Holmes 3-Piece Set"; Transliteration: "Hōmuzu San-ten Setto" (Japanese: ホームズ三点セット)	September 1, 1989
1045	"The Helping Hand Spray"; Transliteration: "Tsuzuki o Yoroshiku" (Japanese: 続きをよろしく)	September 8, 1989
Doraemon makes a helping hand glove with a spray to cover him in fishing while he has something to do. Nobita misuses the spray to help others and leaves people helpless when the helping hands overdo their duties.
1046	"Substitute Microphone"; Transliteration: "Migawari Maiku" (Japanese: 身がわりマイク)	September 15, 1989
Gian seeks Doraemon's help to help Jaiko meet a talented manga artist named Moteo Mote who is admired by many girls. Doraemon helps him using the Substitute Microphone so she can speak her true feelings to Moteo. They arrange for Jaiko and Moteo to meet at a park. Remade as Don't Cry, Jaiko in the 2005 series.
1047	"The Ignorant Insect"; Transliteration: "Mushi Mushi" (Japanese: 無視虫)	September 22, 1989
Gian and Suneo orders the kids to ignore Nobita, after Gian's mother slaps him for troubling Nobita earlier. Doraemon uses the Ignorant Insects on Gian and Suneo to teach them a lesson.
1048	"The Hypnotizing Megaphone"; Transliteration: "Saimin Megafon" (Japanese: さいみんメガフォン)	September 29, 1989
When Suneo won't let Nobita ride in his cousin's super car, Doraemon uses the Hypnotizing Megaphone to turn the family vacuum cleaner into the fastest set of wheels around and Nobita turns Sunekichi's car into a garbage truck. Remade as Going for a Vacuum Cleaner Drive in the 2005 series.
1049	"Home Economy Apron"; Transliteration: "Kateika Epuron" (Japanese: 家庭科エプロン)	October 6, 1989
Shizuka gets mad at Nobita over whether boys should cook, and leaves with Dekisugi, leaving Nobita sad. Doraemon warns Nobita that the future could change any time, especially if he does horrible things. Nobita uses Doraemon's Time TV to see his future self and future Shizuka. But instead of mentioning his son's name Nobisuke, she mentions Hideyo instead. Doraemon takes out the Home-Ec Apron to help Nobita become an expert in the housework. Remade as Winning Back Shizuka-chan in the 2005 series.
1050	"The Map Injector"; Transliteration: "Chizu Chūshaki" (Japanese: 地図ちゅうしゃき)	October 20, 1989
1051	"Where Were You at the Time?"; Transliteration: "Sono Toki Doko ni Ita" (Japanese: そのときどこにいた)	October 27, 1989
1052	"The Actor Plate"; Transliteration: "Narikiri Purēto" (Japanese: なりきりプレート)	November 3, 1989
1053	"Anytime Anywhere Sketch Set"; Transliteration: "Itsudemo Doko demo Sukecchi Setto" (Japanese: いつでもどこでもスケッチセット)	November 10, 1989
When the teacher assigns the students to do a sketch of anything they like for homework, Nobita decides to use Doraemon's Anytime Anywhere Sketch Set to do a sketch of Shizuka. However, she gets angry with him when she sees an image of her bathing in his sketchbook.
1054	"Gian's Dinner Show"; Transliteration: "Jaian no Dinā Shō" (Japanese: ジャイアンのディナーショー)	November 17, 1989
Nobita notices that everyone is scared and paranoid, possibly because of Gian. Remade as The Fear of the Dinner Show in the 2005 series.
1055	"High-Rise Apartments"; Transliteration: "Kōsō Manshon-ka Erebētā" (Japanese: 高層マンション化エレベーター)	November 24, 1989
1056	"Half Razor Blade"; Transliteration: "Hanbun Kotō" (Japanese: 半分こ刀)	December 1, 1989
1057	"Air Conditioning Photo"; Transliteration: "Eakon Foto" (Japanese: エアコンフォト)	December 8, 1989
Remade as The Snow is Hot! The Air Conditioning Photo in the 2005 series.
1058	"Strong Ultra Super Deluxe Candy"; Transliteration: "Kyōryoku Urutora Sūpā Derakkusu Kyandē" (Japanese: 強力ウルトラスーパーデラックスキャンデー)	December 15, 1989
1059	"Nobita's Birth"; Transliteration: "Nobita Tanjō" (Japanese: のび太誕生)	December 22, 1989
1060	"Country Maker"; Transliteration: "Okonomi Kenkoku-yō-hin" (Japanese: お好み建国用品)	December 29, 1989
Nobita expresses his intention of becoming a foreigner to impress the girls. Doraemon offers to help him become one by bringing out a "Country Maker" set which is a set of gadgets that allows the user to create his own country.

== 1990 ==
No.	Title	Original release date
1061	"The Dream Player"; Transliteration: "Dorīmu Pureiyā" (Japanese: ドリームプレイヤー)	January 5, 1990
When Nobita tries to sleep, Doraemon gives him a gadget pillow that gives him a certain type of dream. Nobita repeatedly gives up on each type of dream when things don't go his way only to find out he may have broken it all together. One of the dreams Nobita has is a clear reference to the Star Wars franchise. Remade as The Tale of Nobita's Dream in the 2005 series.
1062	"The Epidemic Collection"; Transliteration: "Ryūko-sei Korekushon" (Japanese: 流行性コレクション)	January 12, 1990
1063	"The Wish Realizing Machine"; Transliteration: "Nozomi Jitsugen-ki" (Japanese: のぞみ実現機)	January 19, 1990
After another beating from Gian, Nobita finds Doraemon using the Wish Realizing Machine and believes it to be his solution. Remade as The Wish Realizing Machine Is Too Much! in the 2005 series.
1064	"Doll Creation Camera"; Transliteration: "Nuigurumi Seizō Kamera" (Japanese: ぬいぐるみせいぞうカメラ)	January 26, 1990
1065	"Nobita's Wicked Aspiration"; Transliteration: "Nobita no Akunin Shigan" (Japanese: のび太の悪人志願)	February 2, 1990
A remake of "Head Down to the Path of Evil."
1066	"A Book's Gift Certificate of the Future"; Transliteration: "Mirai Toshoken" (Japanese: 未来図書券)	February 9, 1990
Nobita uses the future book coupon and shops for two months issue of the unpublished comic book. The writer of the book, Funiako Funio pleads to Nobita to lend the copy to him.
1067	"The Head of the Gorgon"; Transliteration: "Gorugon no Kubi" (Japanese: ゴルゴンの首)	February 16, 1990
A remake of the 1980 episode.
1068	"The Object Replacing Cloth"; Transliteration: "Buttai Kōkan Kurosu" (Japanese: 物体交換クロス)	February 23, 1990
Nobita uses Doraemon's object replacing cloth to execute his mischievous thoughts. To stay safe from everyone's wrath, Nobita wraps himself with the cloth and replaces himself with a cat. As a result, he gets stuck on a roof.
1069	"Environmental Screens and Projectors"; Transliteration: "Kankyō Sukurīn to Purojekutā" (Japanese: 環境スクリーンとプロジェクター)	March 2, 1990
1070	"My Guardian"; Transliteration: "Boku no Mamori Kami-sama" (Japanese: ぼくの守り紙さま)	March 9, 1990
Doraemon pulls out a gadget called Guardian Paper, a piece of paper that protects Nobita from any harm once he prays to it.
1071	"My Paper Craft!"; Transliteration: "Pēpā Kurafuto" (Japanese: ペーパークラフト)	March 16, 1990
Doraemon and Nobita make a paper submarine and explore in the seas.
1072	"A Complete Restoration Liquid"; Transliteration: "Zentai Fukugen-eki" (Japanese: 全体復元液)	March 23, 1990
1073	"The Light or Heavy Meter"; Transliteration: "Funwari Zusshiri Mētā" (Japanese: フンワリズッシリメーター)	March 30, 1990
Doraemon, Dorami, and Nobita use a gadget to reduce Tamako's weight.
1074	"Doraemon's Health Diagnosis"; Transliteration: "Doraemon no Kenkōshinda" (Japanese: ドラえもんの健康診断)	April 6, 1990
Something is very wrong with Doraemon, and it's up to Nobita to fix him from the inside. He uses a Small Light to shrink and enters Doraemon. He then meets Mini-Dora who helps him repair Doraemon. Remade as Doraemon is Really Sick? in the 2005 series.
1075	"The Indoor Travel Set"; Transliteration: "Shitsunai Ryokō Setto" (Japanese: 室内旅行セット)	April 13, 1990
After getting jealous by Suneo's bragging once again, Doraemon fulfills Nobita's wish of visiting places with the help of the indoor trip gadget. However, Nobita pinpoints Shizuka's bathroom and forgets to turn off the gadget while taking out the garbage, resulting in Shizuka seeing the image of her bathroom when she comes to Nobita's room and getting very angry with him.
1076	"The Invincible! Insect Pills"; Transliteration: "Muteki Konshū Tan" (Japanese: 無敵コンチュー丹)	April 20, 1990
Nobita is sick of Gian bullying him, so he eats the "Insect Pills" which give him insect-like powers.
1077	"Mama's Appreciation"; Transliteration: "Mama no Arigatami" (Japanese: ママのありがたみ)	April 27, 1990
A remake of "The Understanding and Thankfulness Machine."
1078	"Stuff Only for You Gas"; Transliteration: "Anata Dake no Mono Gasu" (Japanese: あなただけの物ガス)	May 4, 1990
1079	"Speedy Goggles"; Transliteration: "Supīdo Zōkan Gōguru" (Japanese: スピード増感ゴーグル)	May 11, 1990
1080	"Pinch Runner"; Transliteration: "Pinchi Rannā" (Japanese: ピンチランナー)	May 18, 1990
1081	"Escape From The High-Rise Apartment"; Transliteration: "Kōsō Manshon Dasshutsu Dai Sakusen" (Japanese: 高層マンション脱出大作戦)	May 25, 1990
Doraemon and Nobita try to help their friend Masashi, who has a fear of heights, to escape from the high-rise apartment he's living in so he can help their team win the baseball match.
1082	"Multi-Purpose Cleaner"; Transliteration: "Bannō Kurīnā" (Japanese: 万能クリーナー)	June 1, 1990
Suneo accidentally lends his notebook to Gian, and is horrified as he used a pen to scribble bad things about Gian, and they can't be erased. After much deliberation, Nobita decides to help in exchange for a manga and an autograph from him. Doraemon takes out the Multi-Purpose Cleaner to erase the drawings.
1083	"The Time Pistol"; Transliteration: "Taimu Pisutoru" (Japanese: タイムピストル)	June 8, 1990
1084	"Course Advisor"; Transliteration: "Shinro Adobaizā" (Japanese: 進路アドバイザー)	June 15, 1990
1085	"Diving In Town"; Transliteration: "Machi no Naka de Daibingu" (Japanese: 町の中でダイビング)	June 22, 1990
1086	"Cushion That Passes Through"; Transliteration: "Tsukinuke Zabuton" (Japanese: つきぬけザブトン)	June 29, 1990
1087	"The Resentful Headband"; Transliteration: "Urameshi Zukin" (Japanese: ウラメシズキン)	July 6, 1990
1088	"Substitute Picture Mirror"; Transliteration: "Kawari E Mirā" (Japanese: かわり絵ミラー)	July 20, 1990
1089	"The Magic Lost Articles Finder Spray"; Transliteration: "Otoshimono Kamubakku・Supurē" (Japanese: 落し物カムバック・スプレー)	July 27, 1990
1090	"Virtual Holographic, Fiber-Optical Peep-Slope"; Transliteration: "Mippei Kūkan Tansa-ki" (Japanese: 密閉空間探査機)	August 3, 1990
1091	"Returning Hand"; Transliteration: "Okaeshi Hando" (Japanese: お返しハンド)	August 10, 1990
1092	"Boat Sticker"; Transliteration: "Petari Kanpan" (Japanese: ペタリ甲板)	August 17, 1990
1093	"The Anyday Calendar"; Transliteration: "Kimagure Karendā" (Japanese: きまぐれカレンダー)	August 24, 1990
It is too hot for Nobita, so Doraemon gives him the Anyday Calendar to change the date. Nobita overuses it and causes the end of the world to occur. Remade as Winter Comes on a Midsummer's Day in the 2005 series.
1094	"Real Book"; Transliteration: "Honmo no Ehon" (Japanese: ほんものえほん)	August 31, 1990
1095	"Animal Reincarnation Eggs"; Transliteration: "Dōbutsu Umarekawari Tamago" (Japanese: 動物生まれ変わりタマゴ)	September 7, 1990
1096	"The Great Battle of the Breaking Neighborhood"; Transliteration: "Chōnai Toppa Dai Sakusen" (Japanese: 町内突破大作戦)	September 14, 1990
When Nobita angers many people who wish to apprehend him, Doraemon pulls out a gadget to locate Nobita and guide him back to safety.
1097	"The Universal Encyclopedia"; Transliteration: "Uchū Kanzen Ōhyakka" (Japanese: 宇宙完全大百科)	September 21, 1990
1098	"The Easy Way of a Hermit"; Transliteration: "Sennin Rakuraku Kōsu" (Japanese: 仙人らくらくコース)	September 28, 1990
1099	"Let's Go to Japan 70,000 Years Ago"; Transliteration: "7-Man-Nen Mae no Nippon e Ikō" (Japanese: 7万年前の日本へ行こう)	October 5, 1990
1100	"Justice Police Car"; Transliteration: "Seigi no Mikata Patokā" (Japanese: 正義の味方パトカー)	October 19, 1990
1101	"The Mystery of the Missing Badges"; Transliteration: "Bajji o Sagase" (Japanese: バッジをさがせ)	October 26, 1990
1102	"Food Visualization Gas"; Transliteration: "Shokuhin Shikakuka Gasu" (Japanese: 食品視覚化ガス)	November 2, 1990
1103	"Pet Cream"; Transliteration: "Petto Kurīmu" (Japanese: ペットクリーム)	November 9, 1990
Doraemon gives Nobita a pet rock. Remade as The Cute Rock Story in the 2005 series.
1104	"Raw Material Light"; Transliteration: "Genryō Raito" (Japanese: 原料ライト)	November 16, 1990
1105	"RC Source"; Transliteration: "Rajikon no Moto" (Japanese: ラジコンのもと)	November 23, 1990
1106	"Climate Intensive Equipment"; Transliteration: "Kikō Shūchū Sōchi" (Japanese: 気候集中装置)	November 30, 1990
1107	"The Dharma's Fallen the Hat"; Transliteration: "Daruma-san ga Koronda-bō" (Japanese: ダルまさんが転んだ帽)	December 7, 1990
1108	"Gian and Jaiko"; Transliteration: "Jaian to Jaiko" (Japanese: ジャイアンとジャイ子)	December 14, 1990
1109	"The Copying Spots"; Transliteration: "Utsushi Bokuro" (Japanese: うつしぼくろ)	December 21, 1990
1110	"Happiness Circuit"; Transliteration: "Shiawase Kairo" (Japanese: しあわせカイロ)	December 28, 1990

== 1991 ==
No.	Title	Original release date
S29	"SF Special Ultra Dora-Man"; Transliteration: "SF Chōdaisaku Urudoraman" (Japanese: SF超大作ウラドラマン)	January 4, 1991
Doraemon, Nobita and his friends decide to make a sci-fi superhero movie. However, they have to avoid Gian whom they fear will try to make himself the main star of the film.
1111	"An Unpleasant Feeling Measuring Device"; Transliteration: "Iya Name Mētā" (Japanese: いやなめメーター)	January 11, 1991
1112	"The Dream that Foretells the End of Earth!!"; Transliteration: "Yochi Yume de Chikyū o Sukue!!" (Japanese: 予知夢で地球を救え!!)	January 18, 1991
1113	"Hide-and-Seek Stick"; Transliteration: "Kakurenbō" (Japanese: かくれん棒)	January 25, 1991
Nobita wishes to escape from everyone. So, Doraemon gives him a hide-and-seek stick to become invisible. Nobita misuses the gadget and troubles others. Later, Doraemon, Gian, and Suneo conspire against Nobita.
1114	"Look-alike Pet Food"; Transliteration: "Sokkuri Petto Fūdo" (Japanese: そっくりペットフード)	February 1, 1991
Nobita orders a look-alike pet food and asks Shizuka to feed it to her canary bird. After that, the canary bird gets Shizuka's look and flies away.
1115	"Animating Microwave"; Transliteration: "Ningyō Jidō Kaonpa" (Japanese: 人形自動化音波)	February 8, 1991
Doraemon and Nobita use the Animating Microwave gadget to find Shizuka's lost dolls Jack and later on Jenny, after Nobita carelessly uses the gadget on the latter to find out about Jack's whereabouts. They eventually find Jack in another girl's house, but trouble arises when the girl refuses to give Jack back to them.
1116	"Goods Fortune Teller"; Transliteration: "Shinamono Unsei Kagami" (Japanese: 品物運勢鏡)	February 15, 1991
Nobita promises to meet Shizuka and Dekisugi and goes home. Doraemon uses the seeing glass and predicts the incidents. Nobita goes to an amusement park and forgets about his meeting.
1117	"Mole-type Speaker"; Transliteration: "Hokuro-gata Supīkā" (Japanese: ホクロ型スピーカー)	February 22, 1991
Gian goes to the park with his dog, Muku to impress a girl. But Muku and the girl's dog, Benji get into a fight. The girl gets angry on Gian and walks away from there with Benji.
1118	"Handmade Toys"; Transliteration: "Tezukuri Omocha" (Japanese: 手づくりおもちゃ)	March 1, 1991
Gian spoils Suneo's toy airplane and puts the blame on Nobita. Later, a man gives Nobita a book to prepare hand-made toys. Doraemon and Nobita use the same toys to fight Gian and Suneo.
1119	"Ship in Bottle"; Transliteration: "Senpaku Binzume Zai" (Japanese: 船舶びんづめ材)	March 8, 1991
Doraemon and Nobita make arrangements to store ships in the bottles. However, Suneo steals Doraemon's gadgets and store warships in the bottles. As a result, Suneo's room gets flooded during the war.
1120	"Memory Memorizing Lens"; Transliteration: "Kioku Toridashi Renzu" (Japanese: 記憶とり出しレンズ)	March 15, 1991
The teacher informs the students about the test. So, Nobita uses Doraemon's memory projecting lens to excel in his test. But unfortunately, Nobita remembers the wrong answers and gets a zero in his test.
1121	"Reincarnation Machine"; Transliteration: "Chiri Tsumora Se-ki" (Japanese: チリつもらせ機)	March 22, 1991
Doraemon uses the dust collector gadget to get a big Dora cake. Later, Nobita blackmails Doraemon and uses the dust collector to widen the playground and his garden.
1122	"Shooting Star Navigating Umbrella"; Transliteration: "Nagareboshi Yū Dō Gasa" (Japanese: 流れ星ゆうどうがさ)	March 29, 1991
Nobita uses Doraemon's shooting star navigating umbrella to attract a star. But instead of a star, Nobita catches an SOS capsule and helps the person stuck in space. He gets a video game in return for the favor.
1123	"The Forest is Calling"; Transliteration: "Mori wa Yonde Iru" (Japanese: 森は呼んでいる)	April 5, 1991
1124	"Balloon Everywhere"; Transliteration: "Doko demo Fūsen" (Japanese: どこでも風船)	April 12, 1991
Nobita and Shizuka decide to go watch the cherry blossom trees. So, Doraemon, Nobita and Shizuka use the anywhere balloon to go to Midori and watch the cherry blossom trees.
1125	"Clam Package"; Transliteration: "Kumaguri Pakku" (Japanese: ハマグリパック)	April 19, 1991
Doraemon removes dorayaki and juice cans from the clam pack to celebrate Nobita's new record of scoring zero in his test. Nobita uses the clam to hide his test paper. But Tamako notices it and falls into the clam.
1126	"In and Out Mirror"; Transliteration: "De Hairi Kagami" (Japanese: ではいりカガミ)	April 26, 1991
Doraemon, Nobita and Shizuka enter the reversed world and play volleyball. They put the blame on Gian and Suneo for breaking Kaminari's glass.
1127	"Summon Buzzer"; Transliteration: "Yobitusge Bazā" (Japanese: よびつけブザー)	May 3, 1991
Doraemon uses the Summon Buzzer to stop Tamako from calling Nobita every time. Gian uses the gadget and calls Nobita to his place several times and troubles him.
1128	"Tuned Up Mini 4 Wheels"; Transliteration: "Kaizō Chibi Yonku" (Japanese: 改造チビ四駆)	May 10, 1991
Sueno flaunts his four-wheel cars. So, Doraemon gives Nobita future four wheels and magical screw driver along with the small light to create his own four wheels. Doraemon and Nobita create a four-wheel and teach Suneo and Gian a lesson.
1129	"Actual Human Recorder"; Transliteration: "Akuto Kōdā" (Japanese: アクトコーダー)	May 17, 1991
Nobita scores a home run and wins the match. So, he requests Doraemon to give him a gadget to replay the scenes several times. The next day, he hits 3 strikes instead of a home run. And that replays for 300 times.
1130	"Let the Angel Handle It"; Transliteration: "Enzeru ni Omakase" (Japanese: エンゼルにおまかせ)	May 24, 1991
Doraemon gives Nobita a divine guidance angel to guide him. The angel insists Nobita forget Doraemon. But Nobita refuses to listen to the angel and helps Doraemon.
1131	"Fairy Robot"; Transliteration: "Yōsei Robotto" (Japanese: 妖精ロボット)	May 31, 1991
Nobita wishes for a gadget to complete his incomplete work. So, Doraemon gives Nobita a Fairy box to completes the incomplete work by just falling asleep.
1132	"Wishing Malette"; Transliteration: "Onegai Shōzuchi" (Japanese: おねがい小づち)	June 7, 1991
Suneo begs Doraemon to help him grow tall with the help of a gadget. He forcefully takes the wishing malette from Doraemon to grow tall. Gian smashes Suneo with the malette and gives him a bruise on his head and makes him tall.
1133	"Let's Train Gian!"; Transliteration: "Jaian o Shitsuke yō" (Japanese: ジャイアンをしつけよう)	June 21, 1991
Doraemon gives Suneo and Nobita a training whip to stop Gian from hurting others. But even after being harassed with the whip, Gian refuses to changes his behavior.
1134	"Nobita's Home Tutor"; Transliteration: "Nobita no Kateikyōshi" (Japanese: のび太の家庭教師)	June 28, 1991
Nobita invites the middle school Nobita to help him in his studies. But the high school Nobita also reaches there. Then, all the three Nobita's blame Tamako and Nobisuke for not helping them in their studies in the beginning.
1135	"Nature Plastic Model Series"; Transliteration: "Shizen Kansatsu Puramo Shirīzu" (Japanese: 自然観察プラモシリーズ)	July 5, 1991
1136	"Smoke to Swim in the Sky"; Transliteration: "Ukiwa Paipu to Tabako" (Japanese: うきわパイプとたばこ)	July 12, 1991
Nobisuke takes a decision of not smoking but Doraemon and Nobita make Nobisuke create smoke rings with the help of tobacco and smoke ring pipe.
1137	"Double TV"; Transliteration: "Migawari Terebi" (Japanese: 身代わりテレビ)	July 19, 1991
As Nobita's plan of going to an island with his friends fails due to his illness, Doraemon sends a substitute television A with Shizuka and makes Nobita wear a substitute television B gadget to see what his friends are doing on an island.
1138	"Flower Board"; Transliteration: "Mushi Yose Bōdo" (Japanese: 虫よせボード)	July 26, 1991
The teacher asks the students to collect insects for a project. So, Doraemon removes the flower board gadget from his pocket to attract insects.
1139	"Magical Scissors"; Transliteration: "Jitsubutsu Hasami" (Japanese: じつぶつはさみ)	August 2, 1991
Suneo refuses to give Nobita his toy plane. Hence, Doraemon uses a magical scissor and cuts the catalog pictures to create real toys. Later, Doraemon cuts heavy loaded airplanes from the catalog and trouble Gian and Suneo with it.
1140	"Time Compression Gun"; Transliteration: "Toshitsuki Asshuku Gan" (Japanese: 年月圧縮ガン)	August 9, 1991
Suneo sends Nobita pictures of him being in Hawaii for a holiday. Hence, Doraemon and Nobita reach Hawaii with the help of a compression gun and shock Suneo.
1141	"The Great Adventure in the South Seas"; Transliteration: "Nankai no Dai Bōken" (Japanese: 南海の大冒険)	August 16, 1991
1142	"Time Switch for Human Use"; Transliteration: "Ningen-yō Taimu Suicchi" (Japanese: 人間用タイムスイッチ)	August 23, 1991
As Nobita is a forgetful person, Doraemon makes Nobita wear a human time switch and prepare a schedule for the day. However, Nobita writes AM instead of PM and completes his task in the night.
1143	"Look for the Tsuchinoko"; Transliteration: "Tsuchinoko o Sagase" (Japanese: ツチノコを探せ)	August 30, 1991
Nobita goes in search of a Tsuchinoko and luckily finds one. He shows it to his friends and throws it away. But later, Nobita and Doraemon go in search of it and leave it back in the forest.
1144	"Doraemon's Everywhere"; Transliteration: "Doraemon Dareke" (Japanese: ドラえもんだらけ)	September 6, 1991
Nobita bribes Doraemon with Dorayaki to get his homework done. Though the homework is finished by the next day, Nobita becomes suspicious of Doraemon's exhausted state and travels back to the previous night to find out the truth.
1145	"Monster Incense"; Transliteration: "Hyakki Senkō" (Japanese: 百鬼せんこう)	September 13, 1991
Nobita spends Doraemon's monster incense all over the usable things that were thrown out by Suneo and his family. In the night, Doraemon and Nobita take advantage of the things and eat the meal prepared by it.
1146	"Hiking with Dorami"; Transliteration: "Dorami to Haikingu" (Japanese: ドラミとハイキング)	September 20, 1991
Dorami forcefully sends Doraemon for a regular maintenance checkup and takes care of the Nobi family in his absence. She irritates Nobita and makes him complete his homework.
1147	"Mom's Diet"; Transliteration: "Mama o Daietto" (Japanese: ママをダイエット)	September 27, 1991
Tamako gets worried about her weight. So, Doraemon uses the elongated shrinking telescope to make Tamako thin. However, Nobita makes Tamako more fat and later, Nobita uses the gadget and makes Tamako thin like paper.
1148	"The Hammer Producer of Shooting Stars"; Transliteration: "Nagareboshi Seizō Tonkachi" (Japanese: 流れ星製造トンカチ)	October 4, 1991
Doraemon gives Nobita a falling star hammer to make his wish come true. Suneo hits the hammer on Nobita's head to get his homework done by him. But, the homework gets done in Nobita's book instead of Suneo's book.
1149	"Lucky Hourglass"; Transliteration: "Rakkī Suna Tokei" (Japanese: ラッキー砂時計)	October 11, 1991
Nobita feels unlucky. So, Doraemon gives Nobita a lucky hourglass to change his fortune. Nobita gets lucky when he goes out. But, he gets a scolding from Tamako when the sand gets over.
1150	"Wrapper Cab"; Transliteration: "Furoshiki Takushī" (Japanese: ふろしきタクシー)	October 18, 1991
Doraemon uses a wrapper cab so that Nobita brings the comic books from Motoyama's house with someone else's help. However, a man steps on the cloth and makes Nobita take him to his destination.
1151	"Thank-you Badge"; Transliteration: "Sankyū Bajji" (Japanese: サンキューバッジ)	October 25, 1991
Nobita dislikes a new game brought by Nobisuke and upsets him. So, Doraemon gives Nobita a thank you badge so that he gives thanks to his father and others.
1152	"Waste Taker"; Transliteration: "Muda Habu-ki" (Japanese: むだはぶ機)	November 1, 1991
Doraemon removes the waste detector from his pocket to identify the waste in the house. Tamako prepares a feast from the leftover foods kept in the fridge.
1153	"Universal Painter"; Transliteration: "Bannō Purintā" (Japanese: 万能プリンター)	November 8, 1991
Nobita and Doraemon create a picture and sound recording of insects chirping for Shizuka. Then, Suneo blackmails Nobita for the same. Gian's singing picture gets mixed with the other pictures which irritate the Honekawa family.
1154	"Power Up Megaphone"; Transliteration: "Pawā Appu Megafon" (Japanese: パワーアップメガフォン)	November 15, 1991
Nobita hands over Doraemon's powerup megaphone gadget to Shizuka to cheer the team during the match. Shizuka's cheering makes the team win with a good score.
1155	"Feeling Measure" (Japanese: 苦楽メーター)	November 22, 1991
Doraemon makes Nobita wear 'pain and gain meter'. Nobita gains a lot of happiness instead of hardships. And after enjoying a happy life, Nobita's life moves into pain and sadness.
1156	"100-times yo-ho rice cake" Transliteration: "Ohyaku-do Enyakora Mochi" (Japanese: お百度エンヤコラ餅)	November 29, 1991
Gian gets upset about his mother's health. So, he takes help from Doraemon, who asks him to prepare rice cake with 100 times Yoho rice cake and a special prayer rice. Gian feeds his mother the rice cake and restores her health.
1157	"Find the Concentration Machine"; Transliteration: "Muchūki o Sagase" (Japanese: 夢中機を探せ)	December 6, 1991
Doraemon searches for a passion machine but a bamboo horse jumps out of Doraemon pocket and goes out of the room. Doraemon plays with the horse and forgets about Nobita.
1158	"Hair Catalog set" Transliteration: "Heā Katarogu Setto" (Japanese: ヘアーカタログセット)	December 13, 1991
Nobita takes Doraemon's hair catalog set and changes Gian, Suneo, Shizuka and his look. But he fails to return everyone their original look as he uses all the pictures from the catalog.
1159	"The Future Radio"; Transliteration: "Mirai Rajio" (Japanese: 未来ラジオ)	December 20, 1991
Suneo flaunts his super high vision portable TV. Hence, Doraemon gives Nobita a future radio, which gives information about the future incidents. But Doraemon, Shizuka, and Nobita get fooled with it.
1160	"The Fatigue Energy Collecting Ointment"; Transliteration: "Keron Pasu" (Japanese: ケロンパス)	December 27, 1991
Nobita insists Doraemon place the frog plaster on him to get rid of his tiredness. But Doraemon places the plaster with the frog upside down. Because of which, Nobita finds it difficult to even walk.

== 1992 ==
No.	Title	Original release date
1161	"Go search for a treasure" Transliteration: "Takara Sagashi ni Itou" (Japanese: 宝さがしに行こう)	January 10, 1992
Doraemon and Nobita go out to find treasure with the help of a treasure map finder. Nobita opens the anywhere door to get into the deep sea to find treasure and floods the house with sea water.
1162	"Gachi-gachin"; Transliteration: "Gachigachin" (Japanese: ガチガチン)	January 17, 1992
On seeing Shizuka's tutor praise her, Nobita pops a busy pill into the teacher's mouth and makes him behave strictly with Shizuka. Later, Tamako hires the same teacher for Nobita.
1163	"Sky-see-through frame" Transliteration: "Sora Made Su Tōshi Furēmu" (Japanese: 空まです通しフレーム)	January 24, 1992
As it is very cold, Doraemon uses a sky frame to feel the warmth. Nobita goes to Kurai's place and sees that he lives in a house that is dark and cold. So, Nobita gives the last sky frame from his room to Kurai.
1164	"Spring-breeze round fan" Transliteration: "Harukaze Uchiwa" (Japanese: 春風うちわ)	January 31, 1992
Nobita takes Doraemon's spring breeze fan and invites the spring on the mountain. But as he gets tired blowing air, Nobita and Shizuka take help from Doraemon, who uses 'back to normal' gadget to bring the winters back.
1165	"Super Gian"; Transliteration: "Sūpā Jaian" (Japanese: スーパージャイアン)	February 7, 1992
This episode is a remake of a 1979 episode in the same series, and would later be remade in the 2005 series.
1166	"Thunder drum" Transliteration: "Kaminari Daiko" (Japanese: カミナリだいこ)	February 14, 1992
Gian and Suneo scare Nobita and consider him faint-hearted as he gets scared of the thundering sound. So, Doraemon gives Nobita a thunder drum to help him get rid of his fear.
1167	"Forceful due bill" Transliteration: "Muriyari Shakuyō Kaki" (Japanese: ムリヤリ借用書)	February 21, 1992
Nobita uses Doraemon's I owe you gadget on Suneo and borrows his test paper but realizes that Suneo had got a zero. Suneo's mother invites 3 teachers to teach Suneo, who assume Nobita to be Suneo and act strictly with him.
1168	"Scapegoat paper doll" Transliteration: "Shindaiwari Kami Ningyō" (Japanese: 身代わり紙人形)	February 28, 1992
Shizuka and her friends celebrate Shizuka's birthday. Nobita and Doraemon send 3 scapegoat paper dolls to get their work done. But the paper dolls finish Shizuka's birthday cake.
1169	"Useful things vending machine" Transliteration: "Yakutatsu no Hanbai-ki" (Japanese: 役立つもの販売機)	March 6, 1992
Doraemon and Nobita use the vending machine to vend useful things. Suneo and Gian try the machine. But on not getting what they want, they decide to throw the machine in the lake. However, they fall in the water.
1170	"I want a strong pet" Transliteration: "Tsuyoi Petto ga Hoshī" (Japanese: 強いペットがほしい)	March 13, 1992
Nobita and Doraemon go to the African jungle and bring a lion home with the help of the small light. On seeing Nobita with the lion, a dog named Cheebi gets scared of Nobita.
1171	"The Hamelin Pipe"; Transliteration: "Hamerun Charumera" (Japanese: ハメルンチャルメラ)	March 20, 1992
Gian plays the pied piper to chase Nobita as he disposes of his furniture with the unwanted things from the house with the help of the pied piper of Hamelin. Doraemon brings Nobita back home but the things also follow him.
1172	"After-image materializing spray" Transliteration: "Zanzō Jittai ka Supurē" (Japanese: 残像実体化スプレー)	March 27, 1992
Nobita uses the after image developing spray to find the thief who robbed Gian's cycle. But they only get to see the person's half body. Gian's mother reveals that she took the cycle and gives Gian a beating for being irresponsible.
1173–S	"Go to the Southern Island"; Transliteration: "Minami no Shima e Dekakeyō" (Japanese: 南の島へ出かけよう)	April 3, 1992
1174	"Athletic stickers" Transliteration: "Asurechikku Shīru" (Japanese: アスレチックシール)	April 10, 1992
Doraemon sticks athletic stickers in the house to make Nobita strong and fit. But because of the handgrip athletic sticker, Nobita fails to enter the washroom.
1175	"3D album" Transliteration: "Rittai Arubamu" (Japanese: 立体アルバム)	April 17, 1992
Gian blames Nobita for spoiling his field trip picture and beats him up. So, Doraemon uses the 3-dimensional album from his pocket and reveals the truth that it was Shizuka's hand.
1176	"Bio-plant pot" Transliteration: "Baio-Ueki Kan" (Japanese: バイオ植木カン)	April 24, 1992
Nobita feels upset as he can't enjoy flower viewing while eating tasty food. So, Doraemon uses the bio-plant can to grow cherry blossom trees in the room along with fruits and vegetables
1177	"Family matching case" Transliteration: "Kazoku-awase Kēsu" (Japanese: 家族合わせケース)	May 1, 1992
Nobita, Shizuka, and Suneo get upset as their mothers scold them. So, Doraemon uses the family matching case and sends the kids to their exchanged mothers. But the kids realize how kind their mothers are.
1178	"I want to be a pebble" Transliteration: "Ishikoro ni Naritai" (Japanese: 石ころになりたい)	May 8, 1992
Doraemon gives Nobita the pebble cap so that nobody notices and bothers him. Nobita feels lonely after wearing it and promises to never wear the cap again.
1179	"Computer Pencil"; Transliteration: "Konpyūtā Penshiru" (Japanese: コンピューターペンシル)	May 15, 1992
A remake of "I Got 100%, For Once in My Life..."
1180	"An Uncle's Unrequited Love"; Transliteration: "Ojisan no Kataomoi" (Japanese: おじさんの片思い)	May 22, 1992
Nobita's uncle, Tamao feels sad about not being able to express his love towards a girl. But Doraemon's honest taro doll gadget helps the girl speak her feelings to Tamao.
1181	"Introspective grasshopper" Transliteration: "Hansei Batta" (Japanese: 反省バッタ)	May 29, 1992
Suneo and Gian blame Nobita for dropping Doraemon's cake. So, Doraemon uses grasshoppers to make Suneo and Gian repent for their mistake.
1182	"Hungry rice ball" Transliteration: "Harapeko Onigiri" (Japanese: ハラペコおにぎり)	June 5, 1992
Nobita makes Nobita eat empty belly rice ball to increase his appetite. Later, Tamako eats the rice ball unknowingly and eats all the food alone that was prepared by her.
1183	"Copying Toast"; Transliteration: "Ankipan" (Japanese: アンキパン)	June 12, 1992
A remake of "Memorization Bread for Testing."
1184	"Dream and romance search mole" Transliteration: "Yume to Roman o Tansaku Mogura" (Japanese: 夢とロマンを探索モグラ)	June 19, 1992
The teacher tells the students about the ancient discoveries of great people. So, Nobita and his friends go in search of a discovery with the help of Doraemon's gadgets. But they do not find anything.
1185	"Mini-mini robot" Transliteration: "Mini-mini Robotto" (Japanese: ミニミニロボット)	June 26, 1992
Nobita and Doraemon use the mini-mini robot and repair Nobita's great-grandmother's clock. Nobisuke and Tamako feel very happy and ask Nobita to make use of the clock to go to school.
1186	"Cheer up, Muku!"; Transliteration: "Muku Genki ni Natte" (Japanese: ムク元気になって)	July 3, 1992
Jaiko feels bad for Muku as he gets badly injured in a car accident. So, Nobita and Doraemon go into the past and change Muku's destiny and makes him well.
1187	"Yokozuna Nobita"; Transliteration: "Yokozuna Nobita" (Japanese: 横綱のび太)	July 10, 1992
1188	"Jumping Submarine"; Transliteration: "Janpingu Sensuikan" (Japanese: ジャンピング潜水艦)	July 17, 1992
1189	""Say it for me" Gum"; Transliteration: "Gamu de Migawari" (Japanese: ガムで身代わり)	July 24, 1992
When Gian and Suneo use Nobita as a scapegoat after breaking Kaminari's window, Doraemon gives Nobita the "Say it for me" gum to make Gian and Suneo confess their mistake.
1190	"Butterfly Letters"; Transliteration: "Chōcho Retā" (Japanese: ちょうちょレター)	July 31, 1992
After accidentally dropping Shizuka's homemade cookies, Nobita uses Doraemon's Butterfly Letters gadget to send Shizuka an apology note. However, Gian and Suneo finds out about this and attempt to cause further misunderstandings between the two.
1191	"A Real Picture Book"; Transliteration: "Honmono Zukan de Honmono o" (Japanese: ほんもの図鑑でほんものを)	August 7, 1992
1192–S	"Genius Boy with a Pillow"; Transliteration: "Utsutsu Makura de Tensai Shōnen" (Japanese: うつつ枕で天才少年)	August 14, 1992
1193	"Let's Ride Gian"; Transliteration: "Jaian o Jōtsutorō" (Japanese: ジャイアンを乗っとろう)	August 21, 1992
1194	"Dream Pillow"; Transliteration: "Yume Tsuzuki Makura" (Japanese: 夢つづき枕)	August 28, 1992
1195	"Hardship Miso"; Transliteration: "Kurō Miso Banashi" (Japanese: 苦労みそばなし)	September 4, 1992
A remake of the 1979 episode.
1196	"Watching Glass"; Transliteration: "Uocchingu Gurasu" (Japanese: ウオッチンググラス)	September 11, 1992
1197	"Let You Smell The Forgetting Flower"; Transliteration: "Wasurero Gusa o Kimi ni" (Japanese: わすれろ草を君に)	September 18, 1992
A remake of "The Forgetting Flower."
1198	"Beware of the Bodyguard"; Transliteration: "Bodīgādo ni go Yōjin" (Japanese: ボディーガードにご用心)	September 25, 1992
1199–S	"Parallel Planet"; Transliteration: "Abekobe no Hoshi" (Japanese: あべこべの星)	October 2, 1992
Doraemon gives Nobita a Celestial Globe and a Celestial Telescope so he can explore the universe, and they find a planet that looks exactly like Earth, except that it goes in a reverse direction.
1200	"Voice Candy (1979 anime)" Transliteration: "Koemon Kyandē" (Japanese: 声もんキャンデー)	October 9, 1992
1201	"Is Nobita a Snail?"; Transliteration: "Nobita wa Denden Mushi?" (Japanese: のび太はでんでん虫？)	October 16, 1992
1202	"Nobita thick snail" Transliteration: "Shawā de Kankurenbo" (Japanese: シャワーでかくれんぼ)	October 23, 1992
1203	"I Want to meet Eri-chan"; Transliteration: "Eri-chan ni Aitai" (Japanese: えりちゃんに会いたい)	October 30, 1992
1204	"The Urashima Candy"; Transliteration: "Urashima Kyandē" (Japanese: ウラシマキャンデー)	November 6, 1992
Dorami gives Nobita Urashima Candy, which causes all acts of kindness by the user to be rewarded when eaten.
1205	"Painter Miso Carrot"; Transliteration: "Kurō Miso Ame" (Japanese: くろうみそアメ)	November 13, 1992
1206	"Gene Mic"; Transliteration: "Jīn Maiku" (Japanese: ジーンマイク)	November 20, 1992
1207	"Ask the Stars"; Transliteration: "Ohoshi-sama ni Onegai" (Japanese: お星様にお願い)	November 27, 1992
A remake of "The Wishing Star."
1208	"Nobita is Unloved?"; Transliteration: "Nobita wa Nikumenai?" (Japanese: のび太はニクメない？)	December 4, 1992
1209	"Helpman Appears"; Transliteration: "Herupaman Tōjō" (Japanese: ヘルプマン登場)	December 11, 1992
1210	"Memories of the Scarf"; Transliteration: "Sukāfu no Omoide" (Japanese: スカーフの思い出)	December 18, 1992
1211	"Study with hypnosis!" Transliteration: "Saimin Jutsu de Benkyō o!" (Japanese: さいみん術で勉強を！)	December 25, 1992

== 1993 ==
No.	Title	Original release date
1212–S	"Exploring the Earth"; Transliteration: "Chitei no Kuni Tanken" (Japanese: 地底の国探検)	January 8, 1993
1213	"Skiing in the Garden"; Transliteration: "Sukī wa Hako Niwa de" (Japanese: スキーははこ庭で)	January 15, 1993
1214	"Aladdin's Lamp"; Transliteration: "Arabin no Ranpu" (Japanese: アラビンのランプ)	January 22, 1993
Nobita uses Aladdin's lamp to complete his work. The Aladdin gets out of control and threatens the people for money. But Doraemon captures Aladdin in the lamp.
1215	"Boygirl"; Transliteration: "Otokon'na" (Japanese: オトコンナ)	January 29, 1993
1216	"Leave it to the Antenna"; Transliteration: "Antena ni Omakase" (Japanese: アンテナにおまかせ)	January 29, 1993
1217	"Unlucky Diamond"; Transliteration: "Anrakkī・Daiya" (Japanese: アンラッキー・ダイヤ)	February 5, 1993
As Nobita faces unfortunate accidents, Doraemon uses the unlucky diamond to transfer Nobita's bad luck to someone else.
1218	"Guiding Machine"; Transliteration: "Michibi-ki" (Japanese: みちび機)	February 5, 1993
1219	"Insect of the Sage"; Transliteration: "Sennin no Mushi" (Japanese: 仙人の虫)	February 12, 1993
1220	"Nobita, the Snail?!"; Transliteration: "Rakugaki de Shikaeshi" (Japanese: らくがきでしかえし)	February 12, 1993
1221	"Reversal Spray"; Transliteration: "Gyakuten Supurē" (Japanese: 逆転スプレー)	February 19, 1993
1222	"Gratitude Halo"; Transliteration: "Arigatāya" (Japanese: アリガターヤ)	February 19, 1993
Nobita laments that he does not have a say when being ordered around, so Doraemon gives him the Gratitude Halo, which makes others express their gratitude towards the user and heed his orders.
1223	"Reaction Testing Robot"; Transliteration: "Hannō Tesuto・Robotto" (Japanese: 反応テスト・ロボット)	February 26, 1993
1224	"Tomorrow Selection Machine"; Transliteration: "Ashita Sentaku-ki" (Japanese: 明日せんたく機)	February 26, 1993
1225	"Amusement Sticker"; Transliteration: "Amaenbo Shīru" (Japanese: あまえんぼシール)	March 5, 1993
1226	"Elevator Plate"; Transliteration: "Erebētā Purēto" (Japanese: エレベータープレート)	March 5, 1993
1227	"Furious Sandglass"; Transliteration: "Mushakusha Taimā" (Japanese: ムシャクシャタイマー)	March 12, 1993
1228	"Any Call Microphone"; Transliteration: "Nan demo Yobidashi Maiku" (Japanese: なんでも呼び出しマイク)	March 12, 1993
1229	"The Energy Effect Ointment"; Transliteration: "Kōka Moriage Chīru" (Japanese: 効果もり上げチール)	March 19, 1993
1230	"Shutter Chance Camera"; Transliteration: "Shattā Chansu Kamera" (Japanese: シャッターチャンスカメラ)	March 19, 1993
1231	"Life Rescue Plan"; Transliteration: "Jinsei Yarinoshi Keikaku" (Japanese: 人生やりなおし計画)	March 26, 1993
Nobita and Doraemon travel back to Nobita's kindergarten days so that Nobita can give a young Gian and Suneo their comeuppance and stop their bullying. However, this causes a younger Shizuka to hate him and now Nobita must make a decision between stopping Gian and Suneo's bullying or maintaining Shizuka's friendship.
1232	"Crisp Light"; Transliteration: "Narikiri Raito" (Japanese: なりきりライト)	March 26, 1993
1233–S	"Featherplace"; Transliteration: "Haneari no Yukue" (Japanese: 羽アリのゆくえ)	April 2, 1993
1234	"The Expulsion Machine"; Transliteration: "Kandō-ki" (Japanese: かんどうき)	April 9, 1993
1235	"True Feeling Robot"; Transliteration: "Honne Robotto" (Japanese: 本音ロボット)	April 9, 1993
Nobita is having a problem expressing his true feeling, so Doraemon bring out a gadget to help.
1236	"Compulsory Exercise"; Transliteration: "Undō Manzoku" (Japanese: うんどうまんぞく)	April 16, 1993
1237	"Rental Receiver"; Transliteration: "Rentaru Shībā" (Japanese: レンタルシーバー)	April 16, 1993
1238	"True Voice Signal"; Transliteration: "Honne Shigunaru" (Japanese: 本音シグナル)	April 23, 1993
1239	"The Sleeper Game"; Transliteration: "Nenkororin" (Japanese: ねんころりん)	April 23, 1993
1240	"Family Exchanging Machine"; Transliteration: "Kazoku Torikae-ki" (Japanese: 家族とりかえ機)	April 30, 1993
Tired with their moms usual antics, Nobita, Suneo, and Gian decide to switch family with each other's with the help of Doraemon's gadget.
1241	"A Love Ice Box"; Transliteration: "Aisu Bokkusu" (Japanese: あいすボックス)	April 30, 1993
1242	"Dud Time Machine"; Transliteration: "Duddo Taimu Mashin" (Japanese: グッドタイムマシン)	May 7, 1993
1243	"Mellow in a Little Love"; Transliteration: "Chīsana Koi ni Meromero" (Japanese: 小さな恋にメロメロ)	May 7, 1993
1244	"Boomerang Origami"; Transliteration: "Būmeran Origami" (Japanese: ブーメラン折り紙)	May 14, 1993
1245	"Fanta Grandpa"; Transliteration: "Fanta Jīya" (Japanese: ファンタ爺ヤ)	May 14, 1993
1246	"Tiger Cap"; Transliteration: "Taigā Kyappu" (Japanese: タイガーキャップ)	May 21, 1993
1247	"The Dream Blaster"; Transliteration: "Tsumeri Gan" (Japanese: ツモリガン)	May 21, 1993
1248	"The Personal Limelight"; Transliteration: "Medachi Raito" (Japanese: めだちライト)	May 28, 1993
1249	"Litmus life test paper" Transliteration: "Ritomasu Jinsei Shiken Kami" (Japanese: リトマス人生試験紙)	May 28, 1993
1250	"4D Pouch"; Transliteration: "Yo-jigen Pāchi" (Japanese: 四次元ポーチ)	June 4, 1993
1251	"Famous flag" Transliteration: "Meibutsu Furaggu" (Japanese: 名物フラッグ)	June 4, 1993
1252	"The Associative Deduction Magnifying Glass"; Transliteration: "Rensō Shiki Suiri Mushi Megane" (Japanese: 連想式推理虫メガネ)	June 11, 1993
1253	"The Fishing Pole that Disappeared"; Transliteration: "Karugaru Tsurizao" (Japanese: かるがる釣りざお)	June 11, 1993
1254	"Thinking Feet"; Transliteration: "Kangaeru Ashi" (Japanese: 考える足)	June 18, 1993
1255	"The TV Grabber"; Transliteration: "Terebi Torimochi" (Japanese: テレビとりもち)	June 18, 1993
1256	"Invisibility Lacquer"; Transliteration: "Katazuke Rakkā" (Japanese: かたづけラッカー)	June 25, 1993
1257	"The Real Life Remote"; Transliteration: "Bideo Shiki Nan demo Rimokon" (Japanese: ビデオ式なんでもリモコン)	July 2, 1993
1258	"Handstand seal" Transliteration: "Sakadachi Shīru" (Japanese: 逆立ちシール)	July 9, 1993
1259	"The Pitch-Black Pop Stars"; Transliteration: "Ninki Sutā ga Makkuro Ke" (Japanese: 人気スターがまっ黒け)	July 16, 1993
Envious at Suneo's wide collection of hand and lip prints, Nobita vows to do full body prints of celebrities and causes chaos in the television station.
1260	"Bon Sign Set"; Transliteration: "Bon Sain Setto" (Japanese: ボンサインセット)	July 23, 1993
1261	"Invisible wheels" Transliteration: "Mienai Hojo Wa" (Japanese: 見えない補助輪)	July 30, 1993
1262	"Last-Minute Cramming"; Transliteration: "Ichiyazuke" (Japanese: いちやづけ)	August 6, 1993
1263–S	"The Time machine owners!" Transliteration: "Taimu Mashin de Kainushi o" (Japanese: タイムマシンで飼い主を！)	August 13, 1993
1264	"Galactic tour bus" Transliteration: "Ginga Kankō Basu" (Japanese: 銀河観光バス)	August 27, 1993
1265	"Sports powder" Transliteration: "Supōtsu Paudā" (Japanese: スポーツパウダー)	September 3, 1993
1266	"Balance Trainer"; Transliteration: "Baransu Torēnā" (Japanese: バランストレーナー)	September 10, 1993
1267	"Time machine princess" Transliteration: "Taimu Mashin de Ohime-sama" (Japanese: タイムマシンでおひめさま)	September 17, 1993
1268	"Aliens are coming" Transliteration: "Uchūjin ga Yattekita" (Japanese: 宇宙人がやってきた)	September 24, 1993
1269	"100 Angkor watts" Transliteration: "Ankōru 100-watto" (Japanese: アンコール100ワット)	October 1, 1993
1270–S	"All Alone in the City of the Future"; Transliteration: "Mirai no Machi ga Abunai!!" (Japanese: 未来の町が危ない!!)	October 8, 1993
Nobita's summer vacation is boring as everyone else is busy, so he decides to go to the future.
1271	"Wabisabi Mat"; Transliteration: "Wabisabi Goza" (Japanese: わびさびゴザ)	October 15, 1993
1272	"Holographic Transformation Butter"; Transliteration: "Isu Uma de Haidō" (Japanese: イス馬でハイドー)	October 22, 1993
1273	"Miniature Yacht"; Transliteration: "Minichia Yotto" (Japanese: ミニチュアヨット)	October 29, 1993
1274	"Dororon Ninja Set"; Transliteration: "Dororon Ninja Setto" (Japanese: ドロロン忍者セット)	November 5, 1993
1275	"Softening Hoop"; Transliteration: "Jūnan Siage Fūpu" (Japanese: 柔軟仕上げフープ)	November 12, 1993
1276	"Friend Robot"; Transliteration: "Otomodachi Robotto" (Japanese: お友だちロボット)	November 19, 1993
1277	"Facing the Gians"; Transliteration: "Jaianzu o Buttobase" (Japanese: ジャイアンズをぶっとばせ)	November 26, 1993
1278	"Early Response Postbox"; Transliteration: "Henji Sakidori Pousuto" (Japanese: 返事先取りポスト)	December 3, 1993
1279	"Irresponsible Flying Object"; Transliteration: "Museki Nin Hikō Buttai" (Japanese: むせきにん飛行物体)	December 10, 1993
1280	"Baby Translator"; Transliteration: "Akachan Honyaku-ki" (Japanese: 赤ちゃんほんやく機)	December 17, 1993
1281	"Christmas Ruined"; Transliteration: "Kurisumasu wa Sokonau" (Japanese: クリスマスはそこなう)	December 24, 1993

== 1994 ==
No.	Title	Original release date
1282–S	"Battle of the Plastic Models"; Transliteration: "Puramo-ka Dai Sakusen" (Japanese: プラモ化大作戦)	January 7, 1994
1283	"Come Come Mirror"; Transliteration: "Hikiyose Kagami" (Japanese: ひきよせカガミ)	January 14, 1994
1284	"Video Letters are a Pain"; Transliteration: "Bideo Retā wa Taihen da" (Japanese: ビデオレターは大変だ)	January 21, 1994
1285	"Soft Gas"; Transliteration: "Funwari Gasu" (Japanese: ふんわりガス)	January 28, 1994
1286	"Human Depression"; Transliteration: "Ningen Utsushi" (Japanese: 人間うつし)	February 4, 1994
1287	"Mind Changing Broth"; Transliteration: "Kokoro Gawari Burōchi" (Japanese: こころがわりブローチ)	February 11, 1994
When Gian and Suneo use Nobita as a scapegoat after breaking the glass of an angry swordsman, Doraemon gives Nobita the mind changing broth to change the swordsman's mind and make him get angry at Gian and Suneo instead. However, Shizuka gets exposed to the broth's affects as well which causes her to hate Nobita, much to his grief.
1288	"Masamu Shimbun"; Transliteration: "Masayume Shimbun" (Japanese: 正夢新聞)	February 18, 1994
Doraemon gives Nobita a gadget that produces a newspaper the next day if a person sleeps, it turns out to be gadget of a term of predicts future.
1289	"Time Without Permission"; Transliteration: "Katte ni Taimu" (Japanese: 勝手にタイム)	February 25, 1994
1290	"Primitive Era Park"; Transliteration: "Genshijidai Pāku" (Japanese: 原始時代パーク)	March 4, 1994
1291	"Mini-Dora Rescue Team"; Transliteration: "Minidora Kyūjotai" (Japanese: ミニドラ救助隊)	March 11, 1994
1292	"Super Glove"; Transliteration: "Sūpā Tebukuro" (Japanese: スーパーてぶくろ)	March 18, 1994
1293	"Phantom Thief Cat"; Transliteration: "Kaitō Kyatto no Moto" (Japanese: 怪盗キャットの素)	March 25, 1994
1294	"Thousand Needle Trout"; Transliteration: "Hari Senbon no Masu" (Japanese: ハリ千本ノマス)	April 1, 1994
As it is the 1st of April, Nobita doesn't want to go out or believe anyone so he won't get fooled. Doraemon gives him the Thousand Needle Badge to make any joke said towards him become reality.
1295–S	"Redo Life Machine"; Transliteration: "Jinsei Yarinaoshi-ki" (Japanese: 人生やりなおし機)	April 8, 1994
This episode is a remake of "The Life Do-Over Machine," which would also be remade in the 2005 series.
1296	"The Wallpaper Scenery Changer"; Transliteration: "Kabe Keshiki Kirikae-ki" (Japanese: かべ景色きりかえ機)	April 15, 1994
Nobita has been looking forward to going to see the cherry blossoms, but his Dad has an urgent job that day and had to cancel the trip. Doraemon takes out the Wallpaper Scenery Changer that allows users to see any scenery through a wall.
1297	"Avata is Also a Dimple Seal"; Transliteration: "Abata mo Ekubo Shīru" (Japanese: アバタもエクボシール)	April 22, 1994
1298	"Gian is a Genius"; Transliteration: "Jaian wa Tensai Shōnen" (Japanese: ジャイアンは天才少年)	April 29, 1994
When Gian mysteriously gets a good grade in the class's exam, Nobita and Doraemon must find out the truth.
1299	"Cupid's Wings"; Transliteration: "Kyūpiddo no Tsubasa" (Japanese: キューピッドの翼)	May 6, 1994
1300	"Apple of Snow White"; Transliteration: "Shirayuki-hime no Ringo" (Japanese: 白雪姫のリンゴ)	May 13, 1994
Nobita gives Shizuka a mysterious apple seed as compensation for tearing up her plant book. Doraemon later reveals that the apple seed produces the Snow White's Apple which will put the user to sleep until their prince kisses them.
1301	"Famous Guy Legend Card Pack"; Transliteration: "Denki Kamishibai Setto" (Japanese: デンキ紙芝居セット)	May 20, 1994
1302	"Soap Bubble Communication"; Transliteration: "Shabontama Tsūshin" (Japanese: シャボン玉通信)	May 27, 1994
1303	"The Lazy Day"; Transliteration: "Gūtara Kansha no Hi" (Japanese: ぐうたら感謝の日)	June 3, 1994
Nobita wants June to have a holiday, so he takes Doraemon's gadget and makes June 1 a lazy day, but many problems arise.
1304	"The Rising Small Hat"; Transliteration: "Okiagari no Bōshi" (Japanese: 起き上がり小帽子)	June 10, 1994
1305	"The World is Full of Lies"; Transliteration: "Sekai no Naka Uso Darake" (Japanese: 世の中うそだらけ)	June 17, 1994
After being tricked by Gian, Nobita decides to no longer trust anyone and uses Doraemon's gadget for such purpose.
1306	"A Fan To Change One's Mind"; Transliteration: "Henshin Uchiwa" (Japanese: 変心うちわ)	June 24, 1994
Doraemon uses a Fan To Change One's Mind and makes Nobita study and obey.
1307	"Cloud Mock"; Transliteration: "Kumo no Mokkun" (Japanese: 雲のモッくん)	July 1, 1994
1308	"Gourmet Glass"; Transliteration: "Gurume Gurasu" (Japanese: グルメグラス)	July 8, 1994
Tired of the school's lunch, Nobita decides to borrow a gadget from Doraemon to enjoy gourmet class food at school.
1309	"Fanned Robot"; Transliteration: "Odate Robotto" (Japanese: おだてロボット)	July 15, 1994
1310	"Box Garden Frame"; Transliteration: "Hako Niwa Furēmu" (Japanese: はこにわフレーム)	July 22, 1994
1311	"Item Finding Dragonfly"; Transliteration: "Sagashimono Pettan" (Japanese: 探し物ペッタン)	July 29, 1994
Doraemon uses the Item Finding Dragonfly to find a ribbon that he wants to give to Mii-chan. Nobita then later uses the same gadget to help Shizuka out, but he unintentionally upsets her when he uses the gadget to complete the jigsaw puzzle that she's been working on.
1312	"A Clockwork Hurricane"; Transliteration: "Neji-shiki Taifū" (Japanese: ねじ式台風)	August 5, 1994
1313–S	"Survival with Animal Power"; Transliteration: "Dōbutsu Pawā de Sabaibaru" (Japanese: 動物パワーでサバイバル)	August 12, 1994
1314	"Cup of Spirits"; Transliteration: "Kappu Yūrei" (Japanese: カップゆうれい)	August 19, 1994
1315	"Real Electric Game"; Transliteration: "Honmono Denshi Gēmu" (Japanese: 本物電子ゲーム)	August 26, 1994
1316	"Sweat Sink Tie"; Transliteration: "Asemizu Nagashi Tai" (Japanese: 汗水流しタイ)	September 2, 1994
1317	"Alexandre"; Transliteration: "Arekisandaru" (Japanese: アレキサンダル)	September 9, 1994
1318	"Powerful Inner Ring Wind God"; Transliteration: "Kyōryoku Uchiwa Fūjin" (Japanese: 強力うちわ風神)	September 16, 1994
1319	"Let's Go"; Transliteration: "Tōsenbō" (Japanese: 通せんぼう)	September 23, 1994
1320–S	"Counter-growing Glasses"; Transliteration: "Gyaku Seichō Gurasu" (Japanese: 逆成長グラス)	September 30, 1994
1321	"Yojinbo"; Transliteration: "Yōjinbō" (Japanese: ヨウジンボウ)	October 7, 1994
1322	"Who is Miss Hanako?"; Transliteration: "Hanako-san wa Dare da?" (Japanese: 花子さんは誰だ？)	October 14, 1994
1323	"Pet-Mimicking Manjū"; Transliteration: "Petto Dokkuri Manjū" (Japanese: ペットそっくりまんじゅう)	October 21, 1994
1324	"Request Check"; Transliteration: "Rekuesito Kogitte" (Japanese: リクエスト小切手)	October 28, 1994
1325	"Growth Powder S"; Transliteration: "Addo Gundan" (Japanese: アットグングン)	November 4, 1994
1326	"Doll Stone"; Transliteration: "Daruma Sutōn" (Japanese: ダルマストーン)	November 11, 1994
1327	"Good Antenna"; Transliteration: "Gokigen Antena" (Japanese: ごきげんアンテナ)	November 18, 1994
1328	"Lovey Dovey Umbrella"; Transliteration: "Ai-ai Gasa" (Japanese: あいあいガサ)	November 25, 1994
1329	"Message Fireworks"; Transliteration: "Dengon Hanabi" (Japanese: 伝言花火)	December 2, 1994
1330	"Mom is a Primary School Student"; Transliteration: "Mama wa Shōgaku-go Nensei" (Japanese: ママは小学五年生)	December 9, 1994
1331	"Muyubo"; Transliteration: "Muyūbō" (Japanese: ムユウボウ)	December 16, 1994
1332	"Santa's Chimney"; Transliteration: "Santa Entotsu" (Japanese: サンタえんとつ)	December 23, 1994

== 1995 ==
No.	Title	Original release date
1333–S	"The Expected Lucky Money"; Transliteration: "Otanoshimi Otoshidama Bukuro" (Japanese: おたのしみお年玉ぶくろ)	January 6, 1995
1334	"Owner Seeking Machine"; Transliteration: "Mochinushi Tansa-ki" (Japanese: もちぬし探査機)	January 13, 1995
1335	"Ability Copy Gloves"; Transliteration: "Nōryoku Kopī Tebukuro" (Japanese: 能力コピー手袋)	January 20, 1995
1336	"Present Roots"; Transliteration: "Purezento Rūtsu" (Japanese: プレゼントルーツ)	January 27, 1995
1337	"Cherry-Blossom Viewing in Winter?!"; Transliteration: "Mafuyu ni Hanami?!" (Japanese: ま冬に花見?!)	February 3, 1995
1338	"Plush Camera and Croom"; Transliteration: "Nuigurumi Kamera to Kurūmu" (Japanese: ぬいぐるみカメラとクルーム)	February 10, 1995
1339	"Doctor Bag"; Transliteration: "Oisha-san Kaban" (Japanese: お医者さんカバン)	February 17, 1995
When Nobita supposedly falls sick, Doraemon uses the Doctor Bag gadget to cure him of his illness. Nobita later tries to use the gadget, which ran out of medicine, to "examine" an ill Shizuka but she finds out about his deception from Doraemon and beats up Nobita.
1340	"Various Cloud Cylinders"; Transliteration: "Iroiro Kumo Bonbe" (Japanese: いろいろ雲ボンベ)	February 24, 1995
1341	"Check Spray"; Transliteration: "Ashiato Chekku Supurē" (Japanese: あしあとチェックスプレー)	March 3, 1995
1342	"Hibernation Shelter"; Transliteration: "Tōmin Sherutā" (Japanese: 冬眠シェルター)	March 10, 1995
Doraemon gets angry with Nobita and enters a house.
1343	"I See the Robot"; Transliteration: "Naruho Robotto" (Japanese: なるほどロボット)	March 17, 1995
1344	"Sky Trap"; Transliteration: "Tobashi Ana" (Japanese: とばしあな)	March 24, 1995
1345–S	"Nobita is a Dictator?!"; Transliteration: "Nobita wa Dokusai-sha!?" (Japanese: のび太は独裁者?!)	March 31, 1995
Nobita uses Doraemon's Dictator Switch gadget to get rid of Gian and Suneo, which causes everyone to not remember them. While suffering from a nightmare, he accidentally causes everyone to disappear with the gadget, including Doraemon. While Nobita enjoys his time alone at first, he starts to miss everyone and weeps for them. Doraemon then arrives and reveals that he gave the gadget to teach him a lesson about the importance of people.
1346	"The Lying Machine"; Transliteration: "Usotsu-ki" (Japanese: うそつ機)	April 7, 1995
1347–S	"Good Mood Fan"; Transliteration: "Kibun Sukkuri Kanki Sen" (Japanese: 気分スッキリかんきせん)	April 14, 1995
Doraemon uses the Good Mood Fan to relieve Dad's stress, while Nobita uses it to clear the stress from Doraemon, Shizuka and Gian as well.
1348	"The House Became a Robot"; Transliteration: "Ie ga Robotto ni Natta" (Japanese: 家がロボットになった)	April 28, 1995
Nobita is going to Shizuka's house to study, but Gian forces him to house sit for him. Doraemon turns the house into a robot with a House Robot Gadget, and starts cleaning the house.
1349	"The Talent Mushroom"; Transliteration: "Sainō Kinoko" (Japanese: 才能キノコ)	May 5, 1995
1350	"Unmanned Exploration Rocket"; Transliteration: "Mujin Tansa Roketto" (Japanese: 無人探査ロケット)	May 12, 1995
1351	"Pretend to Be Super Dan"; Transliteration: "Sūpādan Gokko" (Japanese: スーパーダンごっこ)	May 19, 1995
1352	"Weather Card"; Transliteration: "Otenki Kādo" (Japanese: お天気カード)	May 26, 1995
1353	"Pittanko with Space Adhesive"; Transliteration: "Kūkan Secchaku Zai de Pittanko" (Japanese: 空間接着剤でピッタンコ)	June 2, 1995
1354	"Guard Medal"; Transliteration: "Gādo Medaru" (Japanese: ガードメダル)	June 9, 1995
1355	"Fairy Tale Goods"; Transliteration: "Otogibanashi Guzzu" (Japanese: おとぎ話グッズ)	June 16, 1995
1356	"Nobita Timer"; Transliteration: "Nobita no Taimā" (Japanese: のび太のタイマー)	June 23, 1995
1357	"Prospect Machine"; Transliteration: "Mikomi Yohō-ki" (Japanese: みこみ予報機)	June 30, 1995
1358	"It's Tough to Be a Brother"; Transliteration: "Onī-chan wa Tsuraiyo" (Japanese: お兄ちゃんはつらいよ)	July 7, 1995
1359	"Remember the Hammer"; Transliteration: "Omoidashi Tonkachi" (Japanese: 思い出しトンカチ)	July 14, 1995
1360	"Satellite Lift"; Transliteration: "Eisei Rifuto" (Japanese: 衛星リフト)	July 21, 1995
1361	"Swimming in the Vast Universe"; Transliteration: "Hirōi Uchū de Kaisuiyoku" (Japanese: 広ーい宇宙で海水浴)	July 28, 1995
1362	"The Weather Maker Chart"; Transliteration: "Tenki Kettei Omote" (Japanese: 天気決定表)	August 4, 1995
1363–S	"Assorted Monsters"; Transliteration: "Tsumeawase Obake" (Japanese: つめあわせオバケ)	August 11, 1995
Doraemon introduces a case containing many varieties of monsters which will become the allies of whoever holds it.
1364	"Pet Telephone Counseling Room"; Transliteration: "Petto Denwa Sōdan-shitsu" (Japanese: ペット電話相談室)	August 18, 1995
1365	"Ayaushi! Tiger Mask"; Transliteration: "Ayaushi! Taigā Kamen" (Japanese: あやうし！タイガー仮面)	August 25, 1995
1366	"Planetarium Type 3D"; Transliteration: "Puranetariumu Shiki 3D" (Japanese: プラネタリウム式3D)	September 1, 1995
1367	"Time Cloth"; Transliteration: "Taimu Zōkin" (Japanese: タイムぞうきん)	September 8, 1995
1368	"Sea Bathing on a Moving Map"; Transliteration: "Hitsukoshi Chizu de Kaisuiyoku" (Japanese: 引っ越し地図で海水浴)	September 22, 1995
1369	"Exemption Spray"; Transliteration: "Men Ekisu Supurē" (Japanese: 免エキスプレー)	October 6, 1995
1370	"Doing Anything I Please with the Magic Hand!"; Transliteration: "Majikku Hando de Okaeshi o!" (Japanese: マジックハンドでお返しを！)	October 13, 1995
1371	"All Over"; Transliteration: "Ōru Ōbā" (Japanese: オールオーバー)	October 20, 1995
1372	"Secret Video"; Transliteration: "Kossori Bideo" (Japanese: こっそりビデオ)	October 27, 1995
When Suneo records a secret video of Nobita's embarrassing moments and shows it everyone, Nobita and Doraemon use the Secret Video to get revenge on him. They place a recorder on Suneo's cat ChiruChiru so that it can record Suneo's humiliating moment. However, Suneo is not the only one ChiruChiru ends up recording.
1373	"Mama is a Werewolf!?"; Transliteration: "Mama wa Ōkamiotoko!?" (Japanese: ママはオオカミ男!?)	November 3, 1995
When Tamako accidentally applies Doraemon's werewolf cream and heads outside to meet an old acquaintance, Doraemon follows her to make sure she doesn't see any round objects and turn into a werewolf.
1374	"The Body Pump"; Transliteration: "Karada Ponpu" (Japanese: 体ポンプ)	November 10, 1995
1375	"Patriotic Badge"; Transliteration: "Hii-ki Bajji" (Japanese: ひい木バッジ)	November 17, 1995
1376	"I Can't See Anything?!"; Transliteration: "Boku ga Mienakunatta?!" (Japanese: ボクが見えなくなった?!)	November 24, 1995
1377	"Montage Bucket"; Transliteration: "Montāju Baketsu" (Japanese: モンタージュバケツ)	December 1, 1995
1378	"Mini Mini Satellite"; Transliteration: "Mini Mini Eisei" (Japanese: ミニミニ衛星)	December 8, 1995
1379	"If Horn"; Transliteration: "Moshimo Hōn" (Japanese: もしもホーン)	December 15, 1995
1380	"Esper Cap"; Transliteration: "Esupā Kyappu" (Japanese: エスパーキャップ)	December 22, 1995
This episode is a remake of "Esper Hat," and both would later be remade in the 2005 series.

== 1996 ==
No.	Title	Original release date
1381–S	"The Flying Time Cloth"; Transliteration: "Tonda Taimu Furoshiki" (Japanese: とんだタイムふろしき)	January 5, 1996
Doraemon makes the TV, washing machine, golf equipment and other appliances as good as new by using the Time Cloth.
1382	"Backtrack Calendar"; Transliteration: "Atomodori Karendā" (Japanese: あと戻りカレンダー)	January 12, 1996
1383	"Drift Ice Has Arrived!"; Transliteration: "Ryūhyō ga Yaettekita!" (Japanese: 流氷がやってきた！)	January 19, 1996
1384	"Opposite Glove"; Transliteration: "Hantai Gurōbu" (Japanese: 反対グローブ)	January 26, 1996
1385	"Servant Sticker"; Transliteration: "Shimobe Sutekkā" (Japanese: しもべステッカー)	February 2, 1996
1386	"Image Makeover Cream"; Transliteration: "Imēji Henshin Kurīmu" (Japanese: イメージ変身クリーム)	February 9, 1996
1387–S	"Praising Light"; Transliteration: "Homēru Raito" (Japanese: ホメールライト)	February 16, 1996
1388	"Hardship Switch"; Transliteration: "Kurō Suicchi" (Japanese: 苦労スイッチ)	February 23, 1996
1389	"The annoyance after 7 years" Transliteration: "7-nen-go no Nayami" (Japanese: 7年後のなやみ)	March 1, 1996
1390	"Gian's Unstoppable Song"; Transliteration: "Hibike! Jaian no Uta" (Japanese: ひびけ！ジャイアンの歌)	March 8, 1996
1391	"Chic Hack"; Transliteration: "Shikku Hakku" (Japanese: シックハック)	March 15, 1996
1392	"Bag"; Transliteration: "Otsukai Baggu" (Japanese: おつかいバッグ)	March 22, 1996
1393–S	"April Fools"; Transliteration: "Eipuriru Fūru" (Japanese: エイプリルフール)	March 29, 1996
1394	"Magnet Belt"; Transliteration: "Jishaku Beruto" (Japanese: じしゃくベルト)	April 19, 1996
1395	"Touch Gloves"; Transliteration: "Tacchi Gurōbu" (Japanese: タッチグローブ)	April 26, 1996
1396	"Real Cap"; Transliteration: "Riaru Kyappy" (Japanese: リアルキャップ)	May 3, 1996
1397	"Multi-Color Voice Candy"; Transliteration: "Nana-iro no Koe Ame" (Japanese: 七色の声あめ)	May 10, 1996
Doraemon and Nobita use the Multi-Color Voice Candies to prank others.
1398	"Talking Stamp"; Transliteration: "Oshaberi Kitte" (Japanese: おしゃべり切手)	April 17, 1996
1399	"Pandora's Monster"; Transliteration: "Pandora no Obake" (Japanese: パンドラのお化け)	May 24, 1996
1400	"Courage Ethics Hat"; Transliteration: "Yūki Rinrin Bōshi" (Japanese: 勇気リンリン帽子)	May 31, 1996
1401	"Human Motocross"; Transliteration: "Ningen Motokurosu" (Japanese: 人間モトクロス)	June 7, 1996
1402	"I'm Nobiko"; Transliteration: "Watashi Nobiko-yo" (Japanese: わたし、のび子よ)	June 14, 1996
Nobita laments that he's a boy and asks Doraemon to turn him into a girl.
1403	"Chill Chill Paint"; Transliteration: "Chiru-Chiru Penki" (Japanese: チルチルペンキ)	June 21, 1996
1404	"Hustle Screw Winding"; Transliteration: "Hassueru Neji-maki" (Japanese: ハッスルネジ巻き)	June 28, 1996
1405	"Have a Holiday with Jaiko"; Transliteration: "Jaiko ni Kyūjutsu o" (Japanese: ジャイ子に休日を)	July 5, 1996
1406	"Nobita's Brother"; Transliteration: "Nobita no Onī-san" (Japanese: のび太のお兄さん)	July 12, 1996
1407	"Run! Nobita"; Transliteration: "Hashire! Nobita" (Japanese: 走れ！のび太)	July 19, 1996
1408	"24 Hours Each"; Transliteration: "Hito Tsubu 24-jikan" (Japanese: ひとつぶ24時間)	July 26, 1996
1409	"Borrowing in the Shade"; Transliteration: "Kage-kiri Basami" (Japanese: かげ切りバサミ)	August 2, 1996
Remake of the 1979 episode.
1410	"Super Salaryman"; Transliteration: "Sūpā Sararīman" (Japanese: スーパーサラリーマン)	August 9, 1996
1411–S	"Human Puppet"; Transliteration: "Ningen Marionetto" (Japanese: 人間マリオネット)	August 16, 1996
1412	"Exciting Pool"; Transliteration: "Ukiuki Pūru" (Japanese: ウキウキプール)	August 23, 1996
1413	"Find the Owner!"; Transliteration: "Mochinushi o Sagase!" (Japanese: 持ち主を探せ！)	August 30, 1996
1414	"Gourmet Fork Set"; Transliteration: "Gurume Fōku Setto" (Japanese: ぐるめフォークセット)	September 6, 1996
1415	"Dog Nobita Nobi"; Transliteration: "Nobi-inu Nobita" (Japanese: のび犬のび太)	September 13, 1996
1416–S	"3 Minutes Travel by Cup"; Transliteration: "3-Funkan Kappu Ryokō" (Japanese: 3分間カップ旅行)	September 20, 1996
1417	"My younger brother is Nobita"; Transliteration: "Otōto wa Nobita-kun" (Japanese: 弟はのび太くん)	October 11, 1996
1418	"Mii-Chan Is Missing"; Transliteration: "Mii-chan ga Yukue Fumei" (Japanese: ミイちゃんが行方不明)	October 18, 1996
1419	"Pride Kusgrin"; Transliteration: "Puraido Kusugurin" (Japanese: プライドクスグリン)	September 23, 1996
1420	"Card Videophone"; Transliteration: "Kādo Terebi Denwa" (Japanese: カードテレビ電話)	September 30, 1996
1421	"Day is Night, Night is Day?"; Transliteration: "Hiru ga Yoru de, Yoru ga Hiru?" (Japanese: 昼が夜で、夜が昼？)	October 7, 1996
1422	"Melody Spray"; Transliteration: "Merodī Otama" (Japanese: メロディーおたま)	October 14, 1996
1423	"Animal Clinic"; Transliteration: "Animaru Kurinikku" (Japanese: アニマルクリニック)	October 21, 1996
1424	"Creature Traffic Sign"; Transliteration: "Ikimono Kōtsū Hyōshiki" (Japanese: 生き物交通標識)	October 28, 1996
1425	"Gravity Paint"; Transliteration: "Jūryoku Penki Supurē" (Japanese: 重力ペンキスプレー)	December 6, 1996
Doraemon introduces Gravity Paint. When painted on a wall, a person who steps on the material will not fall because the painted portion is not affected by gravity.
1426	"Mini-Dora Great Escape"; Transliteration: "Minidora Dai Dassō" (Japanese: ミニドラ大脱走)	December 13, 1996
1427	"Message to the Future"; Transliteration: "Mirai e no Messēji" (Japanese: 未来へのメッセージ)	December 20, 1996
1428–S	"Santa Mail"; Transliteration: "Santa Mēru" (Japanese: サンタメール)	December 21, 1996
Remade in 2005 as "Nobita Claus on Christmas Eve."

== 1997 ==
No.	Title	Original release date
1429	"Dress-up Strategy"; Transliteration: "Kisekae Sakusen" (Japanese: きせかえ作戦)	January 10, 1997
1430	"The Escape Helmet"; Transliteration: "Kikippatsu Herumetto" (Japanese: 危機一髪ヘルメット)	January 17, 1997
1431	"Mystery Sugoroku"; Transliteration: "Misuteri・Sugoroku" (Japanese: ミステリー・スゴロク)	January 24, 1997
1432	"The Bridge to Tomorrow"; Transliteration: "Ashita ni Kakeru Hashi" (Japanese: 明日にかける橋)	January 31, 1997
1433	"Chushin Storehouse"; Transliteration: "Chūshin Kura" (Japanese: チューシン倉)	February 7, 1997
1434	"Snowman Dora-Taro"; Transliteration: "Yukidaruma Dorataro" (Japanese: 雪だるまドラ太郎)	February 14, 1997
1435	"Key Nozomi"; Transliteration: "Kībō-do" (Japanese: キー望ド)	February 21, 1997
1436–S	"Who Wants Arrow?"; Transliteration: "Hoshī Hito Arō" (Japanese: ほしい人アロー)	February 28, 1997
1437	"The Mammoth is Out!"; Transliteration: "Manmosu ga Deta zo!" (Japanese: マンモスが出たぞ！)	March 7, 1997
1438	"Nasuka-kun"; Transliteration: "Nasuka-kun" (Japanese: ナスカくん)	March 14, 1997
1439	"Mom Apron"; Transliteration: "Mama Epuron" (Japanese: ママエプロン)	March 21, 1997
1440–S	"Sewashi-kun's Runaway"; Transliteration: "Sewashi-kun no Iede" (Japanese: セワシくんの家出)	March 29, 1997
1441	"Sonokininal"; Transliteration: "Sonokināru" (Japanese: ソノキニナール)	April 4, 1997
1442	"Nobita in the Big League"; Transliteration: "Nobita wa Dai Rīgā" (Japanese: のび太は大リーガー)	April 11, 1997
1443	"The Human Locomotive"; Transliteration: "Ningen Kikan Kuruma" (Japanese: 人間機関車)	April 25, 1997
Nobita and Gian are training for the school's three legged race, but Nobita keeps starting with the wrong foot. So Doraemon gives him a gadget that allows him to run as fast as a locomotive. But Nobita ends up eating too much coal and becoming a force of destruction.
1444	"Imaginary Antenna"; Transliteration: "Kyōmei Antena" (Japanese: キョーメイアンテナ)	May 2, 1997
1445–S	"Special Card"; Transliteration: "Supesharu Kādo" (Japanese: スペシャルカード)	May 9, 1997
1446	"Nobita"; Transliteration: "Nobīta" (Japanese: ノビータ)	May 16, 1997
1447	"Lively Pack"; Transliteration: "Genki Hatsuratsu Pakku" (Japanese: 元気ハツラツパック)	May 23, 1997
1448	"Palmistry Realization Set"; Transliteration: "Tesō Jitsugen Setto" (Japanese: 手相実現セット)	May 30, 1997
1449	"Galactic Sightseeing Carriage Tour"; Transliteration: "Ginga Kankō Basha Tsuā" (Japanese: 銀河観光馬車ツアー)	June 6, 1997
1450	"Glass Everywhere"; Transliteration: "Doko demo Gurasu" (Japanese: どこでもグラス)	June 13, 1997
1451	"Nobita Is One Inch Thick"; Transliteration: "Nobita wa Issun-Bōshi" (Japanese: のび太は一寸法師)	June 20, 1997
1452	"Let's Talk with Heart"; Transliteration: "Kokoro de Hanasō" (Japanese: ココロで話そう)	May 26, 1997
1453	"Trolling"; Transliteration: "Tororingu" (Japanese: トロリン)	July 4, 1997
1454	"Surprise Makeover Cookie"; Transliteration: "Bikkuri Henshin Kukkī" (Japanese: びっくり変身クッキー)	July 11, 1997
1455	"Lightning Strikes"; Transliteration: "Ochinai Kaminari" (Japanese: 落ちないカミナリ)	July 18, 1997
1456	"What to Look for Fishing Rod"; Transliteration: "Sagashi-mono Tsuri Zao" (Japanese: 探し物釣りザオ)	July 25, 1997
1457	"Swimming Redo Plan"; Transliteration: "Suiei Yarinaoshi Keikaku" (Japanese: 水泳やり直し計画)	August 1, 1997
1458	"The Balloon Shoes"; Transliteration: "Barūn Shūzu" (Japanese: バルーンシューズ)	August 8, 1997
1459	"Only There Spot"; Transliteration: "Soko dake Supotto" (Japanese: そこだけスポット)	August 15, 1997
1460	"Martial Battery"; Transliteration: "Kakutō-ka Batterī" (Japanese: 格闘家バッテリー)	August 22, 1997
1461	"Nobita's Comet"; Transliteration: "Nobita Suisei" (Japanese: のび太彗星)	August 29, 1997
1462	"Sweet"; Transliteration: "Amaiwato" (Japanese: アマイワト)	September 5, 1997
1463	"Impressive Scene"; Transliteration: "Kandō no Mei Bamen" (Japanese: 感動の名場面)	September 12, 1997
1464	"Please Card"; Transliteration: "Purīzu Kādo" (Japanese: プリーズカード)	September 19, 1997
1465	"A Wooden Set That Can Be Anything"; Transliteration: "Nandemo Naru Ki Setto" (Japanese: 何でもなる木セット)	September 26, 1997
1466–S	"Treasure Star Exploration Rocket"; Transliteration: "Takaraboshi Tansa Roketto" (Japanese: 宝星探査ロケット)	October 4, 1997
1467–S	"Nobita Becomes Suneo?"; Transliteration: "Nobita ga Suneo?" (Japanese: のび太がスネ夫？)	October 4, 1997
1468	"Jumping Light"; Transliteration: "Tobitashi Raito" (Japanese: とびだしライト)	October 17, 1997
1469	"Copy Robot"; Transliteration: "Kopī Robotto" (Japanese: コピーロボット)	October 24, 1997
1470	"Animation Spray"; Transliteration: "Anime Supurē" (Japanese: アニメスプレー)	October 31, 1997
1471	"Interesting Special Video"; Transliteration: "Omoshiro Tokudane Bideo" (Japanese: おもしろ特ダネビデオ)	November 20, 1997
1472	"The Nobita That Stopped Me"; Transliteration: "Boku o Tomeru Nobita" (Japanese: ボクを止めるのび太)	October 27, 1997
When Nobita's uncle gives him 2000 yen, Nobita wonders if he should use the money to buy ramen or a toy model, resulting in the misuse of the time machine and multiple Nobitas fighting over which choice is the best.
1473	"Voice Only Time Machine"; Transliteration: "Koe dake Taimu Mashin" (Japanese: 声だけタイムマシン)	November 3, 1997
1474	"Plastic Model Escapes"; Transliteration: "Puramo ga Dai Dassō" (Japanese: プラモが大脱走)	November 10, 1997
1475	"4D Catcher"; Transliteration: "Yo-jigen Kyacchā" (Japanese: 四次元キャッチャー)	December 5, 1997
1476	"Let's Discipline with Candy"; Transliteration: "Kyandi de Shutsukeyō" (Japanese: キャンディでしつけよう)	December 12, 1997
1477	"Dream Planetarium"; Transliteration: "Mugen Puranetariumu" (Japanese: 夢幻プラネタリウム)	December 19, 1997
1478–S	"Memories Box"; Transliteration: "Omoide Bokkusu" (Japanese: 思いでボックス)	December 23, 1997
1479	"Explosion Maker"; Transliteration: "Bakuhatsu Meikā" (Japanese: バクハツメイカー)	December 23, 1997

== 1998 ==
No.	Title	Original release date
1480	"Mini Parliament"; Transliteration: "Mini-Mini Kokkai" (Japanese: ミニミニ国会)	January 9, 1998
1481	"The Dance Party of the White Radishes"; Transliteration: "Daikon Dansu Pātī" (Japanese: だいこん ダンスパーティー)	January 16, 1998
1482	"Annual Pendant"; Transliteration: "Tsukitsuki Pendanto" (Japanese: つきつきペンダント)	January 23, 1998
1483	"Transfer Map"; Transliteration: "Kakikae Mappu" (Japanese: かきかえマップ)	January 30, 1998
1484	"Special Prize:Nobita Hot Springs"; Transliteration: "Dokushō! Nobita Onsen" (Japanese: 特賞！のび太温泉)	February 6, 1998
1485	"King Set"; Transliteration: "Ōsama Setto" (Japanese: 王様セット)	February 13, 1998
1486	"Rainbow Drop"; Transliteration: "Reinbō Doroppu" (Japanese: レインボードロップ)	February 20, 1998
1487	"Navi Cap"; Transliteration: "Nabi・Kyappu" (Japanese: ナビ・キャップ)	March 13, 1998
1488	"Adult Identity Card"; Transliteration: "Otona o Shikaru ID Kādo" (Japanese: 大人をしかるIDカード)	March 20, 1998
1489	"The Crisis of Dorami in Jurassic"; Transliteration: "Juraki de Dorami ga Dai Pinchi" (Japanese: ジュラ紀で ドラミが大ピンチ)	April 3, 1998
1490	"The New Fashion of Nobita"; Transliteration: "Nobita Nyū Fashon" (Japanese: のび太ニューファッション)	April 3, 1998
1491	"Talking Pet Food"; Transliteration: "Oshaberi Petto Fūdo" (Japanese: おしゃべりペットフード)	April 10, 1998
1492	"Permanent Dream"; Transliteration: "Masa Yume Makura" (Japanese: 正夢まくら)	April 24, 1998
1493	"My Wish Caller"; Transliteration: "Negaigoto Hiki Kae-ki" (Japanese: 願いごと引きかえ機)	May 1, 1998
1494	"Beast Petization Gloves"; Transliteration: "Mōjū Petto-ka Tebukuro" (Japanese: 猛獣ペット化手ぶくろ)	May 8, 1998
1495	"Only Myself Fast-Forwarding Clock"; Transliteration: "Jibun Dake Haya Mawashi Tokei" (Japanese: 自分だけ早回し時計)	May 15, 1998
1496	"Joking Microphone"; Transliteration: "Jōdan Maiku" (Japanese: 冗談マイク)	May 22, 1998
1497	"Supporting Cheer Horn"; Transliteration: "Sapōtā Chia Hōn" (Japanese: サポーターチアホーン)	May 29, 1998
1498	"Angel's Ring"; Transliteration: "Tenshi no Ringu" (Japanese: 天使のリング)	June 5, 1998
1499	"Marnet"; Transliteration: "Marunetto" (Japanese: マルネット)	June 12, 1998
1500	"I Like Allies"; Transliteration: "Mika Tasuki" (Japanese: ミカタスキ)	June 19, 1998
1501	"Two Dimensional Storage Camera"; Transliteration: "Ni-Jigen Shūnō Kamera" (Japanese: 二次元収納カメラ)	June 26, 1998
1502	"Break time surfboard" Transliteration: "Otegary Sāfubōdo" (Japanese: おてがるサーフボード)	July 3, 1998
1503	"The Memory Album"; Transliteration: "Omoide Taiken Arubamu" (Japanese: 思い出体験アルバム)	July 10, 1998
1504	"A Garden in the Sky"; Transliteration: "Kūchū Gāden" (Japanese: 空中ガーデン)	July 17, 1998
1505	"Private Beach Set"; Transliteration: "Ozashiki Kaisuiyoku Setto" (Japanese: お座敷海水浴セット)	July 24, 1998
1506	"Truth Mirror"; Transliteration: "Honne Mirā" (Japanese: ホンネミラー)	July 31, 1998
1507	"Piggybank"; Transliteration: "Chokkinbako" (Japanese: チョッキンバコ)	August 7, 1998
1508	"Nobita's Carriage"; Transliteration: "Nobita Unsō wa Ikaga" (Japanese: のび太運送はいかが)	August 14, 1998
1509	"Before and After Diary"; Transliteration: "Ato Saki Nikki" (Japanese: あとさき日記)	August 21, 1998
1510	"Mister Moodup"; Transliteration: "Misutā・Mūdoappu" (Japanese: ミスター・ムードアップ)	August 28, 1998
1511	"Talkative Spray"; Transliteration: "Oshaberi Supurē" (Japanese: おしゃべりスプレー)	September 11, 1998
1512	"The Restoration Light"; Transliteration: "Fukuzen Raito" (Japanese: 復元ライト)	September 18, 1998
1513	"Throw a Friend"; Transliteration: "Tomodachi no Wa Nage" (Japanese: 友だちのワ投げ)	September 25, 1998
1514	"You're the Protagonist Badge"; Transliteration: "Anta ga Shuyaku Bajji" (Japanese: アンタガ主役バッジ)	October 16, 1998
1515	"Real Dictionary"; Transliteration: "Honmo no Jiten" (Japanese: ほんもの辞典)	October 23, 1998
1516	"Future Playhouse Sheet"; Transliteration: "Mirai Mamagoto Shīto" (Japanese: 未来ままごとシート)	October 30, 1998
1517	"Girl Conditioned"; Transliteration: "Nobita wa Mei Tantei?!" (Japanese: のび太は名探偵？！)	November 6, 1998
1518	"Mini-Dora and the Big Adventure"; Transliteration: "Minidora to Dai Bōken" (Japanese: ミニドラと大冒険)	November 13, 1998
1519	"Snake Rope of Justice"; Transliteration: "Seigi no Sunēku Rōpu" (Japanese: 正義のスネークロープ)	November 20, 1998
1520	"Sympathy Antenna"; Transliteration: "Dōjō Antena" (Japanese: 同情アンテナ)	November 27, 1998
1521	"Guess Who's There?"; Transliteration: "Rodeo Sadoru" (Japanese: ロデオサドル)	December 4, 1998
1522	"Seven Falls and Eight Waking Ladybugs"; Transliteration: "Nana Korobi Tentōmushi" (Japanese: ななころびてんとう虫)	December 11, 1998
1523	"Santa Bag and Christmas"; Transliteration: "Santa Baggu de Kurisumasu" (Japanese: サンタバッグで クリスマス)	December 18, 1998

== 1999 ==
No.	Title	Original release date
1524	"Sun Egg"; Transliteration: "Taiyō Tamago" (Japanese: 太陽たまご)	January 8, 1999
1525	"Water Drop Capsule Journey"; Transliteration: "Mizutama Kapuseru no Tabi" (Japanese: 水玉カプセルの旅)	January 15, 1999
1526	"Power Generation King Eneson"; Transliteration: "Hatsuden-Ō Eneson" (Japanese: 発電王エネソン)	January 22, 1999
1527	"Bad Child Band!?"; Transliteration: "Warui-ko Bando!?" (Japanese: 悪い子バンド!?)	January 29, 1999
1528	"VIP Cream"; Transliteration: "VIP Kurīmu" (Japanese: VIPクリーム)	February 5, 1999
1529	"Jaiko's Valentine"; Transliteration: "Jaiko no Barentain" (Japanese: ジャイ子のバレンタイン)	February 12, 1999
1530	"Eight Powder Soap"; Transliteration: "Iito-ko Sekken" (Japanese: イイト粉セッケン)	February 19, 1999
1531	"Kotodama"; Transliteration: "Kotodama-kun" (Japanese: コトダマ君)	March 12, 1999
1532	"Upside Down Mom's Emblem"; Transliteration: "Sakasa Mama Wappen" (Japanese: さかさママワッペン)	March 19, 1999
1533	"Let's Build a City in the Pump Basement"; Transliteration: "Ponpu Chikashitsu de Machi o Tsukurou" (Japanese: ポンプ地下室で街をつくろう)	March 26, 1999
1534	"Panic Earth"; Transliteration: "Panikku Āsu" (Japanese: パニックアース)	April 9, 1999
1535	"Tre Tree I Did"; Transliteration: "Yatta-ki" (Japanese: やった木)	April 23, 1999
1536	"Almighty Chair"; Transliteration: "Ōrumaiti・Chea" (Japanese: オールマイティ・チェア)	April 30, 1999
1537	"Ear-Friendly Internet"; Transliteration: "Mimiyori Netto" (Japanese: 耳寄りネット)	May 7, 1999
1538	"Animal Pepper"; Transliteration: "Animaru・Peppā" (Japanese: アニマル・ペッパー)	May 14, 1999
1539	"Crab Metter"; Transliteration: "Kanitsu Mettā" (Japanese: カニツメッター)	May 21, 1999
1540	"Cold Blower"; Transliteration: "Kaze Fukimawashi-ki" (Japanese: 風ふきまわし機)	May 28, 1999
1541	"Welcome Back"; Transliteration: "Okaeshi Jishaku" (Japanese: おかえし じしゃく)	June 4, 1999
1542	"Tiger's Tail Set"; Transliteration: "Tora no O Setto" (Japanese: トラの尾セット)	June 11, 1999
1543	"Eiko's Flower Road"; Transliteration: "Eikō no Hanamichi" (Japanese: エイコーの花道)	June 18, 1999
1544	"Forgetful Stick"; Transliteration: "Wasuren Bō" (Japanese: 忘れん棒)	June 25, 1999
1545	"The Rumor Bird of Wind"; Transliteration: "Kaze no Uwasa Tora" (Japanese: 風のウワサ鳥)	July 2, 1999
1546	"The Word Game Transformation Candy"; Transliteration: "Shiritori Henshin Kyandi" (Japanese: しりとり 変身キャンディ)	July 9, 1999
1547	"Nobita's Little Brother is Konta!?"; Transliteration: "Nobita no Otōto Konta!?" (Japanese: のび太の弟コン太!?)	July 16, 1999
1548	"Balance Seesaw"; Transliteration: "Baransu Shīsō" (Japanese: バランスシーソー)	July 23, 1999
1549	"Four Seasons Frog"; Transliteration: "Shiki Kaeru" (Japanese: 四季カエル)	July 30, 1999
1550	"Good Well Pistol"; Transliteration: "Yōi Don Pisutoru" (Japanese: よーいどんピストル)	August 6, 1999
1551	"Hermit Crab"; Transliteration: "Yadokanin" (Japanese: ヤドカリン)	August 13, 1999
1552	"Time Remote"; Transliteration: "Taimu Rimokon" (Japanese: タイムリモコン)	August 20, 1999
1553	"Tornado Trumpet"; Transliteration: "Tatsumaki Rappa" (Japanese: たつまきラッパ)	August 27, 1999
1554	"Not Spray"; Transliteration: "Nainai Supurē" (Japanese: ないないスプレー)	September 3, 1999
1555	"The Seeking Hand"; Transliteration: "Sagashi-te" (Japanese: さがし手)	September 10, 1999
1556	"Super Ultra Clay"; Transliteration: "Sūpā Urutora Nendo" (Japanese: スーパー ウルトラねんど)	September 17, 1999
1557	"Hearing Mimi"; Transliteration: "Kikimimi" (Japanese: 聞きミミ)	September 24, 1999
1558	"My Train Set"; Transliteration: "Mai・Torein Setto" (Japanese: マイ・トレインセット)	October 1, 1999
1559	"Fancy Animal Safari Park Adventure"; Transliteration: "Kūsō Dōbutsu Safari Pāku de Dai Bōken" (Japanese: 空想動物 サファリパークで大冒険)	October 15, 1999
1560	"Stop Towels"; Transliteration: "Sutoppu Taoru" (Japanese: ストップタオル)	October 22, 1999
1561	"Mononoke's Emblem"; Transliteration: "Mononoke Wappen" (Japanese: もののけワッペン)	October 29, 1999
1562	"Ask the Egg"; Transliteration: "Tamago ni Onegai" (Japanese: タマゴにお願い)	November 5, 1999
1563	"Nobita's 3 Years Old!?"; Transliteration: "Nobita 3-sai!?" (Japanese: のび太3さい!?)	November 12, 1999
1564	"Jealous"; Transliteration: "Urayamashi" (Japanese: ウラヤマしい)	November 19, 1999
1565	"Where's the Sparrow's Inn?"; Transliteration: "Suzume no Oyado wa Doko da?" (Japanese: すずめのお宿はどこだ？)	November 26, 1999
1566	"Sewashi's Report"; Transliteration: "Sewashi Repōto" (Japanese: セワシレポート)	December 3, 1999
1567	"Good Thing Point Card"; Transliteration: "Ii koto Pointo Kādo" (Japanese: いいこと ポイントカード)	December 10, 1999
1568	"Sucking Mosquito"; Transliteration: "Ka Chūsha" (Japanese: 蚊チューシャ)	December 17, 1999
S	"Doraemon's 30th Anniversary, 2000! Protect the Future Doraemon! Nobita vs Ant Legion"; Transliteration: "Doraemon Tanjō 30-Shūnen 2000-nen dayo! Doraemon Mirai o Mamore! Nobita VS Ari Gundan" (Japanese: ドラえもん誕生30周年 2000年だよ！ドラえもん 未来を守れ！のび太VSアリ軍団)	December 31, 1999

== 2000 ==
No.	Title	Original release date
1569	"Frog among them" Transliteration: "Sono Uchi Kaeru" (Japanese: そのうちカエル)	January 14, 2000
1570	"Bat Cap"; Transliteration: "Kōmori Kyappu" (Japanese: こうもりキャップ)	January 21, 2000
1571	"Kicky"; Transliteration: "Kikkī" (Japanese: キッキー)	January 28, 2000
1572	"Proverb Game"; Transliteration: "Kotowaza Gēmu" (Japanese: ことわざゲーム)	February 4, 2000
1573	"Pinch Hitter Megaphone"; Transliteration: "Pinchi Hittā・Megahon" (Japanese: ピンチヒッター・メガホン)	February 11, 2000
1574	"Bias"; Transliteration: "Omoikomimī" (Japanese: オモイコミミー)	February 18, 2000
1575	"Shin-Chan Koyama and Doraemon Nobita MEET-UP MIX-UP SPECIAL!"; Transliteration: "Ohina-sama o Sagasou!" (Japanese: おひなさまを探そう！)	March 3, 2000
1576	"Raisema Award"; Transliteration: "Agema-shō" (Japanese: あげま賞)	March 17, 2000
1577–S	"Run Nobita! Robot Court"; Transliteration: "Hashire Nobita! Robotto Saibanshō" (Japanese: 走れのび太！ロボット裁判所)	March 24, 2000
1578	"Election Shoes"; Transliteration: "Senkyokā" (Japanese: センキョカー)	April 14, 2000
1579	"Starlight"; Transliteration: "Sutāraito" (Japanese: スターライト)	April 28, 2000
1580	"A Day-Anything Experience Machine"; Transliteration: "Tsuitachi Nan demo Taiken-ki" (Japanese: 一日なんでも体験機)	May 5, 2000
1581	"Anyone Can Get a Dust Lamp"; Transliteration: "Dare demo Majin Ranpu" (Japanese: 誰でもまじんランプ)	May 12, 2000
1582	"Nobita's Bluebird"; Transliteration: "Nobita no Aoi Tori" (Japanese: のび太の青い鳥)	May 19, 2000
1583	"Exactly-the-Same Controller"; Transliteration: "Sokkuri Kontorōrā" (Japanese: そっくりコントローラー)	May 26, 2000
1584	"Geniune Kanzume"; Transliteration: "Honmo no Kanzume" (Japanese: ほんものカンヅメ)	June 2, 2000
1585	"Guiding Jizo"; Transliteration: "Michibiki Jizō" (Japanese: みちびきジゾウ)	June 9, 2000
1586	"Happy"; Transliteration: "Happī" (Japanese: ハッピー)	June 16, 2000
Nobita believes he is the unluckiest boy in the world. So to cheer him up, Doraemon gives Nobita a Happy Coat to wear and covers his chores, and surely enough Nobita becomes very lucky.
1587	"Iron Muscle Cream"; Transliteration: "Tetsu Kinniku Kurīmu" (Japanese: 鉄筋肉クリーム)	June 23, 2000
1588	"Teleportation Word Game"; Transliteration: "Shiritori Terepōtēshon" (Japanese: しりとりテレポーテーション)	July 7, 2000
Nobita uses the Teleportation Word Game gadget to drop by Shizuka's house, deliver a file to his Dad and also to escape from Gian, by means of shiritori teleportation.
1589	"Pet Reply Bottle"; Transliteration: "Ohenji Petto Boteru" (Japanese: おへんじペットボトル)	July 14, 2000
Suneo swears revenge on Gian after he destroys his remote controlled car and steals Doraemon's Pet Reply Bottle to suck them inside.
1590	"Animal Power Belt"; Transliteration: "Animaru Pawā Beruto" (Japanese: アニマルパワーベルト)	July 21, 2000
1591	"Dream Boat"; Transliteration: "Yume Bōto" (Japanese: 夢ボート)	July 28, 2000
1592	"Desire Mirror"; Transliteration: "Akogare Mirā" (Japanese: あこがれミラー)	August 4, 2000
1593	"Pop Origami"; Transliteration: "Poppu Origami" (Japanese: ポップおりがみ)	August 11, 2000
1594	"Let's Go Swimming"; Transliteration: "Kaisui Yoku e Ikō" (Japanese: 海水浴へ行こう)	August 18, 2000
Doraemon gives Nobita the Anywhere Ticket, which when placed in a door and written with the name of a place, takes one directly to that place.
1595	"The Tickle Flea"; Transliteration: "Kusuguri Nomi" (Japanese: くすぐりノミ)	August 25, 2000
1596–S	"Maho's Wish"; Transliteration: "Maho-chan no Negai" (Japanese: マホちゃんの願い)	September 1, 2000
1597	"Robot God of Fortune"; Transliteration: "Robotto Fuku no Kami" (Japanese: ロボット福の神)	September 8, 2000
1598	"Weird Robot Car"; Transliteration: "Samagure Roboka" (Japanese: きまぐれロボカ)	September 15, 2000
Suneo brags about a car that Suneo's father bought from a foreign country. Doraemon takes out a robot car that can instantly reach a destination.
1599–S	"Gian's Summer Vacation"; Transliteration: "Jaian no Natsuyasumi" (Japanese: ジャイアンの夏休み)	October 13, 2000
1600	"Wish Granting Angel"; Transliteration: "Kikitodoke Enzeru" (Japanese: 聞きとどけエンゼル)	October 20, 2000
1601	"Bird Cap"; Transliteration: "Bādo Kyappu" (Japanese: バードキャップ)	October 27, 2000
1602	"Tea Year Notebook"; Transliteration: "Chantoshi Techō" (Japanese: チャントシてちょう)	November 3, 2000
1603	"Nobita is the Kid General?"; Transliteration: "Nobita ga Gakitaishō?" (Japanese: のび太がガキ大将？)	November 10, 2000
1604	"Twin Balloon"; Transliteration: "Futago Fūsen" (Japanese: ふたごふうせん)	November 17, 2000
1605	"Decavon"; Transliteration: "Dekabon" (Japanese: デカボン)	November 24, 2000
1606	"Cotton Candy Cloud Making Machine"; Transliteration: "Watāme-shiki Kumo Seizō-ki" (Japanese: ワタアメ式雲製造機)	December 1, 2000
1607	"Exploration Pants"; Transliteration: "Tanken Zubon" (Japanese: 探検ズボン)	December 8, 2000
1608	"Mom's Rock Cave"; Transliteration: "Mama no Iwato" (Japanese: ママの岩戸)	December 15, 2000
Nobita's Mom is tired of having to help the guys every time, so Dorami takes her inside Mom's Rock Cave so she can leave her household chores behind and teach the guys a lesson on Mom's importance.

== 2001 ==
No.	Title	Original release date
1609	"Tracker Pochi"; Transliteration: "Tsuiseki Pochi" (Japanese: ついせきポチ)	January 12, 2001
1610	"Virtual Game Board"; Transliteration: "Bācharu Gēmu Bōdo" (Japanese: バーチャルゲームボード)	January 19, 2001
1611	"Nobiko's Appearance!"; Transliteration: "Nobiko Tōjō" (Japanese: のび子登場！)	January 26, 2001
Nobita sees that Gian and Doraemon both have younger sisters, so he gets jealous. Doraemon takes out a gadget called the Robot Family Maker and creates a five-year-old sister called Nobiko for him.
1612	"It's a Book Elephant"; Transliteration: "Honmono da Zō" (Japanese: ほんものだゾウ)	February 2, 2001
1613	"Reply Balloon Gum"; Transliteration: "Henshin Fūsen Gamu" (Japanese: へんしん風船ガム)	February 9, 2001
S30	"Early Spring Doraemon Special; Doraemon: A Grandmother's Recollections"; Transliteration: "Sōshun Doraemon Supesharu; Obāchan no Omoide" (Japanese: 早春 ドラえもん スペシャル おばあちゃんの思い出)	February 16, 2001
Nobita finds his old teddy bear tells his mom not to throw it away. The stuffed animal is a precious gift from his beloved grandmother. Reminiscing about her makes Nobita ask Doraemon to take him back to when he was still three years old and his grandma was still alive.
1614	"Help Me Snow Gloves"; Transliteration: "Otasuke Sunō Tebukuro" (Japanese: お助けスノー手袋)	February 23, 2001
1615	"The Mother Net"; Transliteration: "Mama Netto" (Japanese: ママネット)	March 2, 2001
Nobita, Shizuka, Gian and Suneo use Doraemon's Mother Net and get one another's mothers to help them in their chores.
1616	"Closed Turtle"; Transliteration: "Dojikame" (Japanese: トジカメ)	March 16, 2001
1617–S	"Go to Dandelion Sky"; Transliteration: "Tanpopo Sora o Iku" (Japanese: タンポポ空を行く)	March 23, 2001
Doraemon discovers that Nobita does not have any emotions for plants. To make Nobita understand the emotions of the dandelion, he gives Nobita Fanta Glasses which helps to hear plants' voices.
1618	"Champion Belt"; Transliteration: "Chanpon Beruto" (Japanese: ちゃんぽんベルト)	April 13, 2001
1619	"Promise Ring"; Transliteration: "Yakusoku Ringu" (Japanese: 約束リング)	April 27, 2001
1620	"Please! Gaman the Great"; Transliteration: "Onegai! Gaman-Daiō" (Japanese: お願い！ガマン大王)	May 4, 2001
1621	"Motion Game"; Transliteration: "Tōrui Gēmu" (Japanese: 盗塁ゲーム)	May 11, 2001
Nobita causes his team to lose a baseball match, angering Gian and Suneo. He also has to deliver a package to his mother at the train station. To help him reach safely, Doraemon gives him the Motion Game Set.
1622	"First Prize Radar"; Transliteration: "Ichitōshō Rēdā" (Japanese: 一等賞レーダー)	May 18, 2001
1623	"Message Baco"; Transliteration: "Densho Bako" (Japanese: 伝書バコ)	May 25, 2001
1624	"Jack Beans"; Transliteration: "Jakku Mame" (Japanese: ジャック豆)	June 1, 2001
1625	"Switching Remote"; Transliteration: "Irekae Raito" (Japanese: 入れ替えライト)	June 8, 2001
Nobita uses the Switching Remote gadget to switch abilities with Suneo and Gian so he can be better at baseball, and then with Dekisugi to solve math problems and impress Shizuka.
1626	"Look-Alike Robot Kit"; Transliteration: "Sokkuri Robotto Kitto" (Japanese: そっくりロボットキット)	June 15, 2001
1627	"Speed-up Clock"; Transliteration: "Supīdo Appu Tokei" (Japanese: スピードアップ時計)	June 22, 2001
1628	"Human Weather Forecaster"; Transliteration: "Ningen Tenkiyōhō" (Japanese: 人間天気予報)	June 29, 2001
1629	"Leave It to Alter Ego"; Transliteration: "Bunshin ni Omokase" (Japanese: 分身におまかせ)	July 6, 2001
1630	"Time Camera"; Transliteration: "Taimu Kamera" (Japanese: タイムカメラ)	July 13, 2001
Objects are being stolen from everyone, so Doraemon uses a gadget called the Time Camera to find out who the culprit is.
1631	"Chunta"; Transliteration: "Chunta" (Japanese: チュン太)	August 3, 2001
Nobita finds an injured baby bird named Chunta in the forest and takes it home to care for it. Nobita realizes that Chunta will eventually have to fly away to live in the wild with other birds.
1632	"Leather Ring"; Transliteration: "Irekawa Ringu" (Japanese: 入れかわリング)	August 10, 2001
1633	"Linear Motor Choke"; Transliteration: "Rinea Mōtā Chōku" (Japanese: リニアモーターチョーク)	August 17, 2001
1634	"Siegfried"; Transliteration: "Jīkufurīto" (Japanese: ジークフリート)	August 24, 2001
1635	"Dombra Cream"; Transliteration: "Donbura Kurīmu" (Japanese: ドンブラクリーム)	August 31, 2001
1636	"Tickling Gloves"; Transliteration: "Kochokocho Tebukuro" (Japanese: コチョコチョ手袋)	September 7, 2001
1637	"Forgetful Fan"; Transliteration: "Wasure Uchiwa" (Japanese: 忘れうちわ)	September 14, 2001
1638	"Angel Trumpet"; Transliteration: "Tenshi no Rappa" (Japanese: 天使のラッパ)	September 21, 2001
1639–S	"Nobita's Ancestors"; Transliteration: "Nobita no Gosenzo-sama" (Japanese: のび太のご先祖さま)	October 6, 2001
Remake of "Ancestors, Come On."
1640	"Yumecoder"; Transliteration: "Yumekōdā" (Japanese: ユメコーダー)	October 12, 2001
1641	"Ultra Stopwatch"; Transliteration: "Urutora Sutoppuwacchi" (Japanese: ウルトラストップウォッチ)	October 19, 2001
1642	"Super Catch Ball"; Transliteration: "Sūpā Kyacchi Bēru" (Japanese: スーパーキャッチボール)	October 26, 2001
1643	"Make a Bad Job!"; Transliteration: "Nigate o Tsukucchae!" (Japanese: 苦手を作っちゃえ！)	November 2, 2001
1644	"Passing Cap"; Transliteration: "Tōrinuke Kyappu" (Japanese: 通り抜けキャップ)	November 9, 2001
1645	"Exciting"; Transliteration: "Ukiuki Kiyokiyo" (Japanese: ウキウキクヨクヨ)	November 16, 2001
1646	"Nobita is Unlucky"; Transliteration: "Nobita wa Anrakkī" (Japanese: のび太はアンラッキー)	November 23, 2001
1647	"Keep It Up Uranari-kun"; Transliteration: "Ganbare Uranari-kun" (Japanese: ガンバレうらなりくん)	November 30, 2001
1648	"Pokari = 100 Yen"; Transliteration: "Pokari=100-en" (Japanese: ぽかり=100円)	December 7, 2001
1649	"Air Pistol"; Transliteration: "Kūki Pistoru" (Japanese: 空気ピストル)	December 14, 2001
Remake of "The King of Sharpshooting Contest."

== 2002 ==
No.	Title	Original release date
1650	"The Bungee Catapult"; Transliteration: "Banjī Kataparuto" (Japanese: バンジーカタパルト)	January 11, 2002
A vicious dog steals Nobita's sandwich, So Doraemon gives him the Bungee Catapult gadget to get his sandwich back. Nobita then uses it to take a comic book back from Gian, and give flowers to Shizuka, angering Gian.
1651	"Nobita's Declaration of Independence"; Transliteration: "Nobita Dokuritsu Sengen" (Japanese: のび太 独立宣言)	January 18, 2002
1652	"The House is Squishy!!"; Transliteration: "Ie ga Kunyakunya!!" (Japanese: 家がクニャクニャ!!)	January 25, 2002
1653	"Which One is Lucky?"; Transliteration: "Docchi ga Rakkī?" (Japanese: どっちがラッキー？)	February 1, 2002
1654	"Occupation Test Card"; Transliteration: "Shokugyō Tesuto Kādo" (Japanese: 職業テストカード)	February 8, 2002
1655	"Time Bank"; Transliteration: "Taimu Banku" (Japanese: タイムバンク)	February 22, 2002
1656	"Big Pinch, Shizuka-chan!"; Transliteration: "Shizuka-chan, Dai Pinchi!" (Japanese: しずかちゃん、大ピンチ！)	March 1, 2002
When Shizuka accidentally swallows a candy which was a prize for a trip to Switzerland, she asks Nobita and Doraemon to help her out. Using a submarine, Nobita and Doraemon travel inside Shizuka's stomach to take the candy out
1657	"Cleaning Machine Supercar"; Transliteration: "Sōji-ki Sūpākā" (Japanese: そうじ機スーパーカー)	March 15, 2002
1658	"The Genius Egg"; Transliteration: "Tensai Eggu" (Japanese: 天才エッグ)	March 22, 2002
After watching a baseball match on television, Nobita wants to be a profession baseball player so Doraemon brings out the Genius Egg to let him experience it.
1659–S	"Fourth Dimensional Bag"; Transliteration: "Nazo no Yo-Jigen Kabun" (Japanese: 謎の四次元カバン)	March 30, 2002
1660	"Sketch Back"; Transliteration: "Sukecchi Bakku" (Japanese: スケッチバック)	April 19, 2002
1661	"Suneo's Romance"; Transliteration: "Suneo no Romansu" (Japanese: スネ夫のロマンス)	April 26, 2002
Suneo ends up meeting Luna an actress that he has a crush on. Using Doraemon's Jelly Translator, Suneo takes Luna to Mt Fuji while escaping her bodyguards who are pursuing them.
1662	"The Tanuki Machine"; Transliteration: "Tanu-ki de Bakasō" (Japanese: タヌ機で化かそう)	May 3, 2002
1663	"Vacuum Mosquito"; Transliteration: "Bakyūmu Ka" (Japanese: バキューム蚊)	May 10, 2002
1664	"Gian is Married!?"; Transliteration: "Jaian ga Kekkon!?" (Japanese: ジャイアンが結婚!?)	May 17, 2002
1665	"Mini-Dora Help Squat Out!"; Transliteration: "Minidora Tasuke-tai Shutsudō!" (Japanese: ミニドラ助け隊出動！)	May 24, 2002
1666	"Two-Legged Loach"; Transliteration: "Nihikime Dojō" (Japanese: ニヒキメドジョウ)	May 31, 2002
1667	"Dorami's Happy House"; Transliteration: "Dorami no Happī Hausu" (Japanese: ドラミのハッピーハウス)	June 7, 2002
Nobita wants to invite Shizuka over to his house, but she ends up accepting Suneo's invitation first whereas Gian decides to go to Nobita's house to sing his song to him. Doraemon and Nobita then use the Surprise House gadget in an attempt to scare Gian away, however Shizuka ends up arriving first due to Dorami's intervention and becomes the victim instead. To appease Shizuka, Dorami brings out her Super Deluxe Happy House gadget which turns Nobita's room into a fairy tale land. However, Gian arrives and starts to sing his song.
1668	"Dorami's Sibling's Pack"; Transliteration: "Dorami no Kyōdai Genka" (Japanese: ドラミの兄妹ゲンカ)	June 14, 2002
-
1669	"Dorami's Secret!?"; Transliteration: "Dorami no Himitsu!?" (Japanese: ドラミのヒミツ!?)	June 21, 2002
1670	"Omamori-kun"; Transliteration: "Onamori-kun" (Japanese: オマモリクン)	June 28, 2002
1671	"Anyone Can Experience It"; Transliteration: "Dare demo Taiken-ki" (Japanese: だれでも体験機)	July 5, 2002
1672	"Kingdom Extract"; Transliteration: "Ōkoku Ekisu" (Japanese: 王国エキス)	July 19, 2002
1673–S	"Athletic Memory Jersey"; Transliteration: "Undō Kioku Jāji" (Japanese: 運動記憶ジャージ)	July 26, 2002
1674	"Map World Entrance Machine"; Transliteration: "Chizu Sekai Hairikomi-ki" (Japanese: 地図世界入りこみ機)	August 2, 2002
1675	"Space Eater"; Transliteration: "Supēsu Ītā" (Japanese: スペースイーター)	August 9, 2002
Nobita's manga gets swiped by Gian and Tamako scolds him for hiding his test paper. Fed up with this, he asks Doraemon to give him a gadget that will create secret passageways so that he can take revenge and hide in his room. However, he misuses the gadget and troubles Tamako, Gian, Suneo, and Shizuka (accidentally), unaware that they too can enter the passageway if they find it. They enter Nobita's room through the passageways he made and punish him for his mischief.
1676	"Heart Clean Sheet"; Transliteration: "Hāto Sukkuri Shīto" (Japanese: ハートすっきりシート)	August 16, 2002
1677	"A Rumor Without Root"; Transliteration: "Ne mo Ha mo Aru Uwasa" (Japanese: 根も葉もあるウワサ)	August 23, 2002
When Gian and Suneo spread a rumor that Nobita is taking the school carrots to feed Doraemon, both him and Nobita use the Rumor Without Root gadget to take revenge on them. However, Shizuka still believes the rumor that Gian and Suneo spread, and Nobita accidentally misuses the gadget to make it such that he's friend to all animals causing all of them to invade his house.
1678	"Dorami Kills Edo"; Transliteration: "Dorami Edo o Kiru" (Japanese: ドラミ江戸を斬る)	August 30, 2002
1679	"Swimming Competition with Big Pump"; Transliteration: "Hai Ponpu de Suiei Taikai" (Japanese: ハイポンプで水泳大会)	September 6, 2002
1680	"Ms. Super Warbler"; Transliteration: "Sūpā Ubuisu-Jō" (Japanese: スーパーウグイス嬢)	September 13, 2002
1681	"Mini-Dora's UFO Campaign"; Transliteration: "Minidora UFO Dai Sakusen" (Japanese: ミニドラUFO大作戦)	September 20, 2002
1682	"The Mini-Dora Rental"; Transliteration: "Minidora Rentaru-chū" (Japanese: ミニドラレンタル中)	October 4, 2002
1683–S	"Let's Make Dad's Dream Come True!"; Transliteration: "Papa no Yume o Naeyō!" (Japanese: パパの夢をかなえよう！)	October 5, 2002
1684	"Mini Doras and Mr. Cat Paws"; Transliteration: "Minidora to Neko no Te" (Japanese: ミニドラと猫の手)	October 18, 2002
1685	"My Rival!"; Transliteration: "Boku no Raibaru!" (Japanese: ボクのライバル！)	October 25, 2002
1686	"Finding the Monthly Rabbits"; Transliteration: "Tsuki no Usagi o Sagasou" (Japanese: 月のウサギを探そう)	November 1, 2002
1687	"The Shocking Star"; Transliteration: "Dokkiri Nagareboshi" (Japanese: ドッキリ流れ星)	November 8, 2002
1688	"Deciding Skill Suit"; Transliteration: "Kime-waza Sūtsu" (Japanese: 決め技スーツ)	November 15, 2002
1689	"Shizuka's Spy Strategy"; Transliteration: "Shizuka no Supai Dai Sakusen" (Japanese: しずかのスパイ大作戦)	November 22, 2002
A rich girl is kidnapped by a group of mysterious people, and it's up to Shizuka and the gang to save the day.
1690	"Prophet Gian"; Transliteration: "Yogen-sha Jaian" (Japanese: 予言者ジャイアン)	November 29, 2002
1691	"Mae Performer"; Transliteration: "Mē Enki" (Japanese: メー演機)	December 6, 2002
1692	"Go to School by Roller Coaster"; Transliteration: "Jetto Kōsuta de Gakkō e" (Japanese: ジェットコースターで学校へ)	December 13, 2002
1693	"The Flattering Power Microphone"; Transliteration: "Odate Pawā Megahon" (Japanese: おだてパワーメガホン)	December 20, 2002
1694–S	"All the Way From the Country of the Future"; Transliteration: "Mirai no kara Harunaru to" (Japanese: 未来の国からはるばると)	December 31, 2002
While Nobita relaxes in his room, he hears a voice. Just then, Doraemon pops out from the drawer and tells him about his future. Sewashi enters and introduces Doraemon as a robot from the 22nd century who has come to help Nobita. Doraemon shows Nobita his gadgets and promises to help him whenever required.

== 2003 ==
No.	Title	Original release date
1695	"The Premier Seal"; Transliteration: "Puremia Shīru" (Japanese: プレミアシール)	January 17, 2003
1696	"Screw Wrapped Travel Note"; Transliteration: "Neji-maki Ryokō-ki" (Japanese: ねじ巻き旅行記)	January 24, 2003
1697	"Nobita's Everywhere"; Transliteration: "Nobita ga Ippai" (Japanese: のび太がいっぱい)	January 31, 2003
Doraemon reveals the Tuning Fork that duplicates the user, but reduces both of their weights by half. Nobita borrows the Tuning Fork from Doraemon to get pocket money from Uncle and be at Shizuka's house at the same time.
1698	"Security Camber"; Transliteration: "Hoan Kanbajji" (Japanese: 保安カンバッジ)	February 7, 2003
1699	"Various Glasses"; Transliteration: "Iroiro Megane" (Japanese: いろいろメガネ)	February 14, 2003
1700	"Konoyubitomare"; Transliteration: "Konoyubitomare" (Japanese: コノユビトマレ)	February 28, 2003
1701	"Emmusubi"; Transliteration: "Enmusubī" (Japanese: 縁むすビー)	March 14, 2003
1702	"Voice Over Mic"; Transliteration: "Fukikae Maiku" (Japanese: フキカエマイク)	March 21, 2003
1703	"Kowappen"; Transliteration: "Kowappen" (Japanese: コワッペン)	April 4, 2003
1704–S	"Dorami Appeared! Nobita's Submarine Adventure"; Transliteration: "Dorami-chan Tōjō! Nobita no Kaitei Dai Bōken" (Japanese: ドラミちゃん登場！ のび太の海底大冒険)	April 5, 2003
1705	"Micro Flash"; Transliteration: "Maikuro Furasshu" (Japanese: ミクロフラッシュ)	April 11, 2003
Doraemon introduces the Micro Flash to Nobita, which makes him small. Nobita then introduces the Micro Flash to Shizuka.
1706	"Nobita and Ushiwakamaru"; Transliteration: "Nobita to Ushiwakamaru" (Japanese: のび太と牛若丸)	April 18, 2003
1707	"Boomerang Spray"; Transliteration: "Būmerang Supurē" (Japanese: ブーメランスプレー)	April 25, 2003
1708	"Counseling Note"; Transliteration: "Kaunseringu Nōto" (Japanese: カウンセリングノート)	May 2, 2003
1709	"Creature Protection Light"; Transliteration: "Ikimono Hogo Raito" (Japanese: 生き物保護ライト)	May 9, 2003
1710	"Random Disk"; Transliteration: "Omakase Disuku" (Japanese: おまかせディスク)	May 16, 2003
A music show is coming up at school. Shizuka, Dekisugi, Suneo, Gian, and Nobita are selected to perform, but Nobita still can not master his instrument and has chores. Doraemon, who is busy preparing for a date with Mii-chan, gives Nobita a pair of Random Disks that allows Nobita to do the housework.
1711	"The Replacement Mirror"; Transliteration: "Irekae Mirā" (Japanese: いれかえミラー)	May 23, 2003
Nobita is extremely surprised when Doraemon suddenly randomly swaps places with him. Doraemon tells him he used the Replacement Mirror, and Nobita as usual becomes greedy and runs off with it, causing a lot of trouble for many people.
1712	"The Weather Exchange Map"; Transliteration: "Otenki Kōkan Chizu" (Japanese: お天気コーカン地図)	May 30, 2003
Suneo brags to his friends and shows them a video of his visit to Hawaii, where the weather is clear and sunny. Nobita wants to live in such an atmosphere so Doraemon uses a gadget called the Weather Exchange Map to help him.
1713	"The Toy Town"; Transliteration: "Omocha Taun" (Japanese: おもちゃタウン)	June 6, 2003
Suneo gives away old toys to Nobita. Nobita feels bad for the toys who were thrown away. Doraemon decides to help the toys with The Toy Rescue Squad Set, which repairs them.
1714	"Head Hunting"; Transliteration: "Heddo Hantingu" (Japanese: ヘッドハンチング)	June 13, 2003
A championship winning baseball player, Shigeto Suzuki is in town, and Gian desperately wants him in the team. He tells Nobita to persuade him to enter the team, or Gian will kick Nobita out. Nobita talks to Shigeto, but he will only enter the team if Nobita quits. Realizing he will be kicked out both ways, Nobita goes to Doraemon for help, who gives him a gadget called Head Hunting.
1715	"Laugh-Out-Loud Pepper"; Transliteration: "Bakushō Koshō" (Japanese: 爆笑コショウ)	June 20, 2003
1716	"Robotic Balloon"; Transliteration: "Fūsen Robokitto" (Japanese: ふうせんロボキット)	June 27, 2003
Gian becomes jealous when Nobita steals the spotlight with his robotic balloons.
1717	"GO in Jutan"; Transliteration: "Jūtan de GO" (Japanese: ジュータンでGO)	July 4, 2003
1718	"Weight Sucking Dropper"; Transliteration: "Jū-sa Suitoru Supoito" (Japanese: 重さ吸いとりスポイト)	July 11, 2003
1719	"Four-Dimensional Elevator"; Transliteration: "Yo-jigen Erebētā" (Japanese: 四次元エレベーター)	July 18, 2003
1720	"Let's Cut the Sea"; Transliteration: "Umi i Kiritorō" (Japanese: 海を切りとろう)	July 25, 2003
1721	"Bakusui Herb"; Transliteration: "Bakusui Hābu" (Japanese: 爆睡ハーブ)	August 1, 2003
1722	"Bite Cane"; Transliteration: "Kaminari Sutekki" (Japanese: かみなりステッキ)	August 8, 2003
1723	"Mobile Family"; Transliteration: "Kētai Kazoku" (Japanese: ケータイ家族)	August 15, 2003
1724	"Memory Digging Video"; Transliteration: "Kioku Horidashi Bideo" (Japanese: 記憶掘りだしビデオ)	August 22, 2003
1725–S	"Selfish Watch"; Transliteration: "Wagamama Dokei" (Japanese: わがまま時計)	August 29, 2003
1726	"Cloud Fishing"; Transliteration: "Kumo Tsurizao" (Japanese: 雲つりざお)	September 5, 2003
1727	"The Shadow Warrior"; Transliteration: "Kagemusha" (Japanese: かげムシャ)	September 12, 2003
1728	"Absorption Paper"; Transliteration: "Torikomi Pēpā" (Japanese: 取りこみペーパー)	September 19, 2003
Nobita and Doraemon try to flee when Gian is going to hold another concert, but are asked by Nobita's Mom to dump the unwanted furniture at the recycling station. Dorami helps them out by using the Absorption Paper to make the moving easier.
1729–S	"Tour Robot"; Transliteration: "Tsuā Robotto" (Japanese: ツアーロボット)	October 4, 2003
1730	"Yurei Straw"; Transliteration: "Yūrei Sutorō" (Japanese: ゆうれいストロー)	October 10, 2003
1731	"Maneonet"; Transliteration: "Maneonetto" (Japanese: マネオネット)	October 17, 2003
1732	"Suck Up Magnet"; Transliteration: "Suiyose Jishaku" (Japanese: 吸いよせ磁石)	October 24, 2003
1733	"Leave It All to Dorami"; Transliteration: "Dorami ni Omakase" (Japanese: ドラミにおまかせ)	October 31, 2003
When Dorami argues with Sewashi over the design of his drone, she leaves for Nobita's time to spend time with him.
1734	"A Cane That Doesn't Roll Down"; Transliteration: "Korobanu Saki no Tsue" (Japanese: ころばぬ先の杖)	November 7, 2003
1735	"Pledge Coyaku"; Transliteration: "Kōyaku Kōyaku" (Japanese: 公約コーヤク)	November 14, 2003
1736	"Portable Pyramid"; Transliteration: "Pōtaburu Piramiddo" (Japanese: ポータブル ピラミッド)	November 21, 2003
1737	"Know-Known"; Transliteration: "Himitsudōgu Dai Boshū Yūshū-shō Sakuhin Monochi~ru" (Japanese: ひみつ道具大募集優秀賞作品 物知～る)	November 28, 2003
1738	"Nakanaolin"; Transliteration: "Nakanaorin" (Japanese: ナカナオリン)	December 5, 2003
1739	"Mini-Dora is the Source of the Cold"; Transliteration: "Minidora wa Kaze no Kin" (Japanese: ミニドラはカゼの素)	December 12, 2003

== 2004 ==
No.	Title	Original release date
1740	"Vine Twist"; Transliteration: "Himitsudōgu Dai Boshū Yūshū-shō Sakuhin Tsuru no Dondenkaeshi" (Japanese: ひみつ道具大募集優秀賞作品 つるのどんでん返し)	January 9, 2004
1741	"Vacuum Elephant"; Transliteration: "Bakyūmu Zou" (Japanese: バキュームゾウ)	January 16, 2004
1742	"Real Experience TV"; Transliteration: "Jitsutaiken Terebi" (Japanese: 実体験テレビ)	January 23, 2004
1743	"Ant and Grasshopper Batch"; Transliteration: "Himitsudōgu Boshū Yūshū-shō Sakuhin Ari to Kirigirisu Bacchi" (Japanese: ひみつ道具大募集優秀賞作品 アリとキリギリスバッチ)	January 30, 2004
1744	"Mini-Dora and the Hot Spring Eggs"; Transliteration: "Minidora to Onsen Eggu" (Japanese: ミニドラと温泉エッグ)	February 6, 2004
Doraemon is on vacation along with a cat while Mini-Doras give Nobita an egg gadget that summons the Hot Springs.
1745	"Favorite Room Catalog"; Transliteration: "Okonomi Rūmu Katarogu" (Japanese: お好みルームカタログ)	February 13, 2004
1746	"Ayatrix"; Transliteration: "Ayatorikkusu" (Japanese: アヤトリックス)	February 27, 2004
1747	"Manzai Master"; Transliteration: "Himitsudōgu Dai Boshū Yūshū-shō Sakuhin Manzai-shi" (Japanese: ひみつ道具大募集優秀賞作品 まんざいし)	March 12, 2004
1748	"Go! Patrol Corps"; Transliteration: "Ike! Patorūru-tai" (Japanese: 行け！パトルール隊)	March 19, 2004
1749	"Pet Whistle"; Transliteration: "Petto Oissuru" (Japanese: ペットホイッスル)	March 26, 2004
1750–S	"Rubber Cam Candy"; Transliteration: "Gomu・Kamu・Kandē" (Japanese: ゴム・カム・カンデー)	April 2, 2004
1751	"Shortcutter"; Transliteration: "Shōtokattā" (Japanese: ショートカッター)	April 16, 2004
1752	"Multi-Color Transformation Beads"; Transliteration: "Nana-iro Kengetama" (Japanese: 七色変化だま)	April 23, 2004
1753	"Yam Brand"; Transliteration: "Burando Imo" (Japanese: ブランドいも)	April 30, 2004
1754	"Decision Hachimaki"; Transliteration: "Kesshin Hachimaki" (Japanese: 決心ハチマキ)	May 7, 2004
1755	"Lucky Color Bar"; Transliteration: "Rakkī Karā Bō" (Japanese: ラッキーカラー棒)	May 14, 2004
1756	"Sea God Poseidon Set"; Transliteration: "Kaijin Poseidon Setto" (Japanese: 海神ポセイドンセット)	May 21, 2004
1757	"Bonus"; Transliteration: "Bōnasu" (Japanese: ぼーナス)	May 28, 2004
1758	"Transparent Tons"; Transliteration: "Sukeru-ton" (Japanese: 透けるトン)	June 4, 2004
1759	"Soap Bubble"; Transliteration: "Shobun-tama" (Japanese: ショボン玉)	June 11, 2004
1760	"Image Navigation Kit"; Transliteration: "Imēji Nabikitto" (Japanese: イメージナビキット)	June 18, 2004
Gian becomes miserable after losing his important belonging and both Nobita and Suneo are curious in finding out what it is.
1761	"Slapstick Tooth Decay Fugitive Symbol"; Transliteration: "Dotabata Mushiba Tōbō-ki" (Japanese: ドタバタ虫歯逃亡記)	June 25, 2004
Nobita and Sewashi both need to go to the dentist because of cavities, but they are too scared and run away instead. Doraemon and Dorami go after them.
1762	"Washing Utensils"; Transliteration: "Araigumo" (Japanese: あらいぐも)	July 2, 2004
1763	"Kappa's Disk"; Transliteration: "Kappa no Osara" (Japanese: カッパのおさら)	July 16, 2004
1764	"Mammoth Watching"; Transliteration: "Manmosu Uocchingu" (Japanese: マンモスウォッチング)	July 23, 2004
1765	"The Birth of Detective Nobita!"; Transliteration: "Mei Tantei Nobita!!" (Japanese: 名探偵のび太!!)	August 6, 2004
1766	"Nobita's Home Away from Home"; Transliteration: "Nobita no Iede" (Japanese: のび太の家出)	August 13, 2004
1767	"Courage Hundred-fold Fan"; Transliteration: "Yūki Hyaku-bai Uchiwa" (Japanese: 勇気百倍うちわ)	August 27, 2004
1768	"Makeover Insect Suit"; Transliteration: "Konchū Henshin Sūtsu" (Japanese: 昆虫変身スーツ)	September 3, 2004
1769	"The Anticipating Capsule"; Transliteration: "Sakidori Kapuseru" (Japanese: さきどりカプセル)	September 10, 2004
1770	"The Two Shizuka-chans"; Transliteration: "Futari no Shizuka-chan" (Japanese: 二人のしずかちゃん)	September 17, 2004
Nobita uses Doraemon's cloning gadget to make a clone of himself so that he could shop for clothes with Shizuka while the clone and Doraemon go to Suneo's house to play with him and Gian. To make the choice of clothes easier, Shizuka uses the gadget to create a clone of herself, but the clone becomes possessive and after a scuffle, the gadget ends up in Nobita's hands. Now Nobita needs to find out who the real Shizuka is by asking a question only she can answer.
1771	"The Samurai Topknot"; Transliteration: "Samurai Chonmage" (Japanese: サムライちょんまげ)	September 24, 2004
Nobita wants to experience living in the world of ancient Japan, so Doraemon gives him a gadget to make his wish come true.
1772–S	"Goodbye to You"; Transliteration: "Tameshi ni Sayōnara" (Japanese: ためしにさようなら)	October 1, 2004
This episode is a remake of "Farewell Nobita," and both would be remade in the 2005 series.
1773	"All You Have to Do is Eat a Gourmet Table!"; Transliteration: "Gurume Tēburu Kake de Tabehōdai" (Japanese: グルメテーブルかけで食べ放題!!)	November 26, 2004
1774	"X-Ray Stickers"; Transliteration: "Tōshi Shīru" (Japanese: 透視シール)	December 3, 2004
A remake of "Big Problem With the X-Ray Stickers."
1775	"Mini-Doras on the Scoop!?"; Transliteration: "Minidora de Sukūpu!?" (Japanese: ミニドラでスクープ!?)	December 10, 2004
1776	"Nobita and Nobio"; Transliteration: "Nobita to Nobio" (Japanese: のび太とのび夫)	December 17, 2004
Nobita meets a little boy called Nobio and they become friends. Nobio starts to think of Nobita as an older brother and they share a close bond.
1777–S	"The Banner of Truth"; Transliteration: "Shinbutsu no Hatajirushi" (Japanese: 真実の旗印)	December 18, 2004
Nobita gets misblamed by Kaminari for drawing on the walls of his house after picking up a chalk on the ground and comes late as a result, causing Sensei to punish him. After hearing Nobita's woes, Doraemon gives him the banner of truth which will make a person believe what the one holding it is saying. Nobita uses the banner to cause some mischief.

== 2005 ==
No.	Title	Original release date
1778	"Teacher's Worst Day!"; Transliteration: "Sensei Saiaku no Tsuitachi!" (Japanese: 先生サイアクの一日！)	January 7, 2005
1779	"Nobita's Buried Treasure"; Transliteration: "Nobita no Maizō Kin" (Japanese: のび太の埋蔵金)	January 14, 2005
1780	"A Love Letter that is too good" Transliteration: "Dekisuhi Raburetā" (Japanese: できすぎラブレター)	January 21, 2005
1781	"The Proposal from 13 years ago" Transliteration: "13-nen Me no Puropōzu" (Japanese: 13年目のプロポーズ)	January 28, 2005
A remake of "Nobita's Proposal Strategy", which would also be remade in the 2005 series.
1782	"Gorgeous Light"; Transliteration: "Gōjasu Raito" (Japanese: ゴージャスライト)	February 4, 2005
1783	"Nobita's Rocket to Space!"; Transliteration: "Nobita Roketto Ginga e!" (Japanese: のび太ロケット銀河へ！)	February 18, 2005
The gang decides to go on a space adventure.
1784	"Doraemon is Suneo's!?"; Transliteration: "Doraemon wa Suneo no Mono!?" (Japanese: ドラえもんは スネ夫のモノ!?)	February 25, 2005
Suneo concocts a plan to put Doraemon under his control.
1785	"Magical Witch Shizuka-chan"; Transliteration: "Mahōtsukai Shizuka-chan" (Japanese: 魔法使いしずかちゃん)	March 4, 2005
A remake of "Magical Girl Shizu-chan".
1786	"45 Years Later..."; Transliteration: "45-nen-go・・・" (Japanese: 45年後・・・)	March 11, 2005
Nobita is visited by his future self. Remade as "45 Years Later... My Future Self Came to Visit" in the 2005 series.
1787	"Doraemon Takes a Day Off!!"; Transliteration: "Doraemon ni Kyūjitsu o?!" (Japanese: ドラえもんに休日を?!)	March 18, 2005
Nobita is determined to have Doraemon enjoy his one-day break with Mii-chan without bothering him. Final episode.
