= Lists of Doraemon (2005 TV series) episodes =

For the 2005 Japanese anime television series Doraemon, List of Doraemon (2005 TV series) episodes may refer to:

- List of Doraemon (2005 TV series) episodes (2005–2014), a list of the 2005–2014 episodes of Doraemon
- List of Doraemon (2005 TV series) episodes (2015–2024), a list of the 2015–2024 episodes of Doraemon
- List of Doraemon (2005 TV series) episodes (2025–present), a list of the episodes starting from 2025 of Doraemon

== Series overview ==
Year	Episodes	Originally released	
Year	Episodes	First released	Last released
2005	32	April 15, 2005	December 31, 2005
2006	42	January 13, 2006	December 31, 2006
2007	36	January 12, 2007	December 31, 2007
2008	44	January 11, 2008	December 31, 2008
2009	42	January 9, 2009	December 31, 2009
2010	38	January 8, 2010	December 17, 2010
2011	43	January 3, 2011	December 16, 2011
2012	40	January 6, 2012	December 31, 2012
2013	35	January 11, 2013	December 30, 2013
2014	35	January 17, 2014	December 30, 2014
2015	39	January 9, 2015	December 31, 2015
2016	41	January 15, 2016	December 31, 2016
2017	38	January 13, 2017	December 31, 2017
2018	42	January 7, 2018	December 31, 2018
2019	37	January 18, 2019	December 28, 2019
2020	52	January 11, 2020	December 31, 2020
2021	51	January 9, 2021	December 31, 2021
2022	52	January 8, 2022	December 31, 2022
2023	48	January 7, 2023	December 31, 2023
2024	47	January 6, 2024	December 28, 2024
2025	49	January 11, 2025	December 27, 2025
2026	TBA	January 10, 2026	TBA

== See also ==
- List of Doraemon (2005 TV series) episodes (English dub), a list of Doraemon episodes dubbed into English
- Doraemon (1973 TV series), the 1973 TV series
- Doraemon (1979 TV series), the 1979 TV series
  - List of Doraemon (1979 TV series) episodes (1979–1986)
  - List of Doraemon (1979 TV series) episodes (1987–2005)
