= List of Doraemon (2005 TV series) episodes (2005–2014) =

The following is a list of episodes of the anime television series Doraemon (2005 anime).

== Series overview ==
Year	Episodes	Originally released	
Year	Episodes	First released	Last released
2005	32	April 15, 2005	December 31, 2005
2006	42	January 13, 2006	December 31, 2006
2007	36	January 12, 2007	December 31, 2007
2008	44	January 11, 2008	December 31, 2008
2009	42	January 9, 2009	December 31, 2009
2010	38	January 8, 2010	December 17, 2010
2011	43	January 3, 2011	December 16, 2011
2012	40	January 6, 2012	December 31, 2012
2013	35	January 11, 2013	December 30, 2013
2014	35	January 17, 2014	December 30, 2014
2015	39	January 9, 2015	December 31, 2015
2016	41	January 15, 2016	December 31, 2016
2017	38	January 13, 2017	December 31, 2017
2018	42	January 7, 2018	December 31, 2018
2019	37	January 18, 2019	December 28, 2019
2020	52	January 11, 2020	December 31, 2020
2021	51	January 9, 2021	December 31, 2021
2022	52	January 8, 2022	December 31, 2022
2023	48	January 7, 2023	December 31, 2023
2024	47	January 6, 2024	December 28, 2024
2025	49	January 11, 2025	December 27, 2025
2026	TBA	January 10, 2026	TBA

== 2005 ==
No. overall	No. in season	Title	Original release date
1	1	"The Fishing Pond in My Study Room"; Transliteration: "Benkyō Beya no Tsuribori" (Japanese: 勉強べやの釣り堀)	15 April 2005
1	1	"The Time Machine is Lost!!"; Transliteration: "Taimu Masin ga Naku Natta!" (Japanese: タイムマシンがなくなった！！)	15 April 2005
1	1	"Remember! The Excitement of That Day"; Transliteration: "Omoidase! Ano Hi no Kandō" (Japanese: 思い出せ！あの日の感動)	15 April 2005
2	2	"Slow Down! Hurry Up"; Transliteration: "Noro Noro, Jita Bata" (Japanese: のろのろじたばた)	22 April 2005
2	2	"Noby's Wife"; Transliteration: "Nobita no Oyome-san" (Japanese: のび太のおよめさん)	22 April 2005
3	3	"The Dictator Switch"; Transliteration: "Dokusai Suitchi" (Japanese: どくさいスイッチ)	29 April 2005
4	4	"The Stuporsonic Verminator"; Transliteration: "Odoroki onpa hasshinki" (Japanese: 驚音波発振器)	6 May 2005
4	4	"The Almighty Pass"; Transliteration: "Orumaiti Pasu" (Japanese: オールマイティーパス)	6 May 2005
5	5	"The Time Cloth"; Transliteration: "Taimu Furoshiki" (Japanese: タイムふろしき)	13 May 2005
5	5	"The Dandelion That Flew Away in the Sky"; Transliteration: "Tanpopo sora o iku" (Japanese: タンポポ空を行く)	13 May 2005
6	6	"Top Secret Spy Operation"; Transliteration: "Supaidaisakusen" (Japanese: スパイ大作戦)	20 May 2005
6	6	"Hello, Alien"; Transliteration: "Haro Uchu Jin" (Japanese: ハロー宇宙人)	20 May 2005
7	7	"Nobita's Underground Country"; Transliteration: "Nobita no chitei kuni" (Japanese: のび太の地底国)	27 May 2005
8	8	"The Switching Rope"; Transliteration: "Jinwakae Ropu Rekae" (Japanese: 入れかえロープ物語)	3 June 2005
8	8	"Cartoonist Jaiko"; Transliteration: "Manga-ka jai-ko" (Japanese: まんが家ジャイ子)	3 June 2005
9	9	"Doraemon's Everywhere"; Transliteration: "Doraemon Darake" (Japanese: ドラえもんだらけ)	10 June 2005
9	9	"Heart Cologne"; Transliteration: "Kokorokoron" (Japanese: ココロコロン)	10 June 2005
10	10	"My Love Just Won't Stop~Meow"; Transliteration: "Sukide tamara nya i" (Japanese: 好きでたまらニャい)	17 June 2005
10	10	"Bottle Cap Collection"; Transliteration: "Wan kan Korekushon" (Japanese: 王かんコレクション)	17 June 2005
11	11	"Very, Very Strange Umbrellas"; Transliteration: "Okashita Okashita Kasa" (Japanese: おかしなおかしなかさ)	24 June 2005
11	11	"Now-Now Stick"; Transliteration: "Maa Maa Bou" (Japanese: まあまあ棒)	24 June 2005
12	12	"I Got 100%, For Once in My Life..."; Transliteration: "Isshō ni ichido wa hyaku-ten o" (Japanese: 一生に一度は百点を)	1 July 2005
12	12	"The Cursing Camera"; Transliteration: "Norui no Kamera" (Japanese: のろいのカメラ)	1 July 2005
12	12	"Star Wars in My Attic"; Transliteration: "Tenjō ura no uchū sensō" (Japanese: 天井うらの宇宙戦争)	1 July 2005
13	13	"The Transformation Biscuits"; Transliteration: "Henshin Bisuketto" (Japanese: 変身ビスケット)	8 July 2005
13	13	"Goodbye, Shizuka"; Transliteration: "Shizuka-chan Sayounara" (Japanese: しずかちゃん、さようなら)	8 July 2005
14	14	"The Debut of the Mood-Changing Orchestra!"; Transliteration: "Mūdo moriage gakudan tōjō!" (Japanese: ムードもりあげ楽団登場！)	15 July 2005
14	14	"The Friend Circle"; Transliteration: "Tomodachinowa" (Japanese: 友だちの輪)	15 July 2005
15	15	"Wrestling Killer"; Transliteration: "Korobashi ya" (Japanese: ころばし屋)	29 July 2005
15	15	"The Woodcutter's Spring"; Transliteration: "Kikorinoizumi" (Japanese: きこりの泉)	29 July 2005
16	16	"Doraemon's Prediction"; Transliteration: "Doraemon no dai yogen" (Japanese: ドラえもんの大予言)	5 August 2005
16	16	"The Girl Who is Pure Like a Madonna Lily"; Transliteration: "Shira yuri no yōna on'nanoko" (Japanese: 白ゆりのような女の子)	5 August 2005
17	17	"Shadow Hunting"; Transliteration: "Kagegari" (Japanese: かげがり)	12 August 2005
17	17	"The Memory Bread"; Transliteration: "Tesuto ni Anki-pan" (Japanese: テストにアンキパン)	12 August 2005
18	18	"Antique Wars"; Transliteration: "Kodōgu Kyōsō" (Japanese: 古道具きょう争)	19 August 2005
18	18	"Ghost Lamp"; Transliteration: "Kaidan Rampu" (Japanese: 怪談ランプ)	19 August 2005
19	19	"Dream Wind Chime"; Transliteration: "Yume Fūrin" (Japanese: ゆめふうりん)	26 August 2005
19	19	"The Change of Clothes Camera"; Transliteration: "Kisekae Kamera" (Japanese: 着せかえカメラ)	26 August 2005
20	20	"Ancestors, Come On"; Transliteration: "Gosenzo-sama Ganbare" (Japanese: ご先祖さまがんばれ)	2 September 2005
21	21	"The Bowing Grasshoppers"; Transliteration: "Peko Peko Batta" (Japanese: ペコペコバッタ)	9 September 2005
21	21	"Noby, Li'l G's Boyfriend"; Transliteration: "Jaiko no Koibito = Nobita" (Japanese: ジャイ子の恋人 = のび太)	9 September 2005
22	22	"The Guiding Angel"; Transliteration: "Michibiki enzeru" (Japanese: ミチビキエンゼル)	16 September 2005
22	22	"Noby Can't Find His Way Home"; Transliteration: "Ie ga Dandan Tookunaru" (Japanese: 家がだんだん遠くなる)	16 September 2005
23	23	"I Like You! I Like You! I Like Youuu!"; Transliteration: "Aa, suki, suki, suki!" (Japanese: ああ、好き、好き、好き！)	23 September 2005
23	23	"Let's Put Ace to Sleep!"; Transliteration: "Dekisugi Gussuri Sakusen" (Japanese: 出木杉グッスリ作戦)	23 September 2005
24	24	"The Good Ol' Days"; Transliteration: "Mukashi wa Yokatta" (Japanese: 昔はよかった)	21 October 2005
24	24	"Treasure Planet"; Transliteration: "Hoshin" (Japanese: 宝星)	21 October 2005
25	25	"Beware! It's the Lion Mask!"; Transliteration: "Ayaushi! Raion Kamen" (Japanese: あやうし！ライオン仮面)	28 October 2005
25	25	"Noby Runs Away From Home for a Veeeery Long Time"; Transliteration: "Nobita no Naga〜iede" (Japanese: のび太のなが～い家出)	28 October 2005
26	26	"Honest Taro"; Transliteration: "Akira Naotarou" (Japanese: 正直太郎)	4 November 2005
26	26	"The Medusa Head"; Transliteration: "Gorugon no Guri" (Japanese: ゴルゴンの首)	4 November 2005
27	27	"The King of Sharpshooting Contest"; Transliteration: "Kenjū Ō Kontesuto" (Japanese: けん銃王コンテスト)	11 November 2005
27	27	"Werewolf Cream"; Transliteration: "Ookami Otoko Kurimu" (Japanese: おおかみ男クリーム)	11 November 2005
28	28	"The All-Season Badge"; Transliteration: "Oru Shizun Bajji" (Japanese: オールシーズンバッジ)	18 November 2005
28	28	"Operation: Y Candle"; Transliteration: "Wai Rō Sakusen" (Japanese: Yロウ作戦)	18 November 2005
29	29	"Hardship Miso"; Transliteration: "Kuruu Miso" (Japanese: くろうみそ)	25 November 2005
29	29	"The Invincible! Insect Pills"; Transliteration: "Kung Konchu Tan" (Japanese: 無敵コンチュー丹)	25 November 2005
30	30	"I Love You, Roboko"; Transliteration: "Roboko ga Aishitero" (Japanese: ロボ子が愛してる)	2 December 2005
30	30	"The Voice Thickener"; Transliteration: "Koe no Katamari" (Japanese: 声のかたまり)	2 December 2005
31	31	"N-S Badges"; Transliteration: "N•S Wappen" (Japanese: N・Sワッペン)	9 December 2005
31	31	"The Snail House Sure is Carefree"; Transliteration: "Den Den Hausu wa Kiraku dana" (Japanese: デンデンハウスは気楽だな)	9 December 2005
32	32	"Romance in the Snowy Mountain"; Transliteration: "Yukiyama no Romansu" (Japanese: 雪山のロマンス)	31 December 2005
32	32	"The Big R/C Naval Battle"; Transliteration: "Rajikon Daikaisen" (Japanese: ラジコン大海戦)	31 December 2005
32	32	"Eight Days in the Palace of the Dragon King"; Transliteration: "Riyuu Miyagi no Hachi Nichikan" (Japanese: 竜宮城の八日間)	31 December 2005

== 2006 ==
No.	Title	Original release date
65	"The Smoke Monster of the Lamp"; Transliteration: "Ranpu no Kemuri Obake" (Japanese: ランプのけむ りオバケ)	January 13, 2006
66	"The New Year's Party in the Wallpaper"; Transliteration: "Kabegami no Naka de Shinnenkai" (Japanese: かべ紙の中で新年会)	January 13, 2006
67	"I'm Going to Transfer this Cold"; Transliteration: "Kono Kaze Utsushimasu" (Japanese: このかぜうつします)	January 20, 2006
68	"Hot Spring Trip"; Transliteration: "Onsen Ryokō" (Japanese: 温泉旅行)	January 20, 2006
69	"The Paddy Field Mat"; Transliteration: "Tatami no Tanbo" (Japanese: タタミのたんぼ)	January 27, 2006
70	"The Over-exaggerating Overcoat"; Transliteration: "Ōbā Ōbā" (Japanese: オーバーオーバー)	January 27, 2006
71	"The Illustrated Encyclopedia of Real Things"; Transliteration: "Hommono Zukan" (Japanese: ほんもの図鑑)	February 3, 2006
72	"Creating the Earth"; Transliteration: "Chikyū Seizō Hō" (Japanese: 地球製造法)	February 3, 2006
73	"The Progression-Regression Beam"; Transliteration: "Shinka Taika Bīmu" (Japanese: 進化退化ビーム)	February 10, 2006
74	"The Castaway Story from Long Ago"; Transliteration: "Ō Mukashi Hyōryūki" (Japanese: 大むかし漂流記)	February 10, 2006
75	"The Dream Channel"; Transliteration: "Yume no Channeru" (Japanese: ゆめのチャンネル)	February 17, 2006
76	"Dinosaur Footprints Discovered"; Transliteration: "Kyōryū no Ashiato Hakken" (Japanese: 恐竜の足あと発見)	February 17, 2006
77	"The Big Papercraft Riot"; Transliteration: "Kami Kōsaku ga Ō Abare" (Japanese: 紙工作が大あばれ)	February 24, 2006
78	"A Dinosaur is Here!?"; Transliteration: "Kyōryū ga Deta!?" (Japanese: 恐竜が出た！？)	February 24, 2006
79	"Oh, Mr. Dinosaur... Please Come to Japan"; Transliteration: "Kyōryū-san Nihon e Dōzo" (Japanese: 恐竜さん日本へどうぞ)	February 24, 2006
80	"Nature Plastic Model Series"; Transliteration: "Shizen Kansatsu Puramo Shirīzu" (Japanese: 自然観察プラモシリーズ)	March 3, 2006
81	"Giant Monster of the Uninhabited Island"; Transliteration: "Mujintō no Dai Kaibutsu" (Japanese: 無人島の大怪物)	March 10, 2006
82	"The Word Game Transformation Egg"; Transliteration: "Shiritori Henshin Tamago" (Japanese: しりとり変身卵)	March 17, 2006
83	"I'll Be the King of the Stone Age"; Transliteration: "Sekki Jidai no Ōsama ni" (Japanese: 石器時代の王さまに)	March 17, 2006
84	"The Great Avalanche in My Room"; Transliteration: "Benkyō Beya no Ō Nadare" (Japanese: 勉強べやの大なだれ)	March 24, 2006
85	"The Big Fossil Discovery"; Transliteration: "Kaseki Dai Hakken" (Japanese: 化石大発見!)	March 24, 2006
86	"Space Tarzan"; Transliteration: "Uchū Tāzan" (Japanese: 宇宙ターザン)	March 24, 2006
87	"All the Way From the Country of the Future"; Transliteration: "Mirai no Kuni Kara Harubaru to" (Japanese: 未来の国からはるばると)	April 21, 2006
88	"The City of Dreams, Nobita Land"; Transliteration: "Yume no Machi Nobita Rando" (Japanese: ゆめの町、ノビタランド)	April 28, 2006
89	"I'm Gonna Become a Fine Dad!"; Transliteration: "Rippa na Papa ni Naruzo!" (Japanese: りっぱなパパになるぞ！)	April 28, 2006
90	"Esper Suneo"; Transliteration: "Esupā Suneo" (Japanese: エスパースネ夫)	May 5, 2006
91	"Suneo is the Ideal Big Brother"; Transliteration: "Suneo wa Risō no Onīsan" (Japanese: スネ夫は理想のお兄さん)	May 5, 2006
92	"Even in the Stomach, in the Acid"; Transliteration: "Tatoe I no Naka, Mizu no Naka" (Japanese: たとえ胃の中、水の中)	May 12, 2006
93	"Pero! Come Back to Life"; Transliteration: "Pero! Ikikaette" (Japanese: ペロ!生きかえって)	May 12, 2006
94	"Fever! Gian Fanclub"; Transliteration: "Fībā! Gian F.C" (Japanese: フィーバー！ジャイアンF・C)	May 19, 2006
95	"Gian's Feeling Down"; Transliteration: "Gunnyari Gian" (Japanese: グンニャリジャイアン)	May 19, 2006
96	"Big Problem With the X-Ray Stickers"; Transliteration: "Tōshi Shīru de Dai Pinchi" (Japanese: 透視シールで大ピンチ)	May 26, 2006
97	"The Human Book Cover"; Transliteration: "Ningen Bukku Kabā" (Japanese: 人間ブックカバー)	May 26, 2006
98	"Don't Cry, Jaiko"; Transliteration: "Nakuna Jaiko yo" (Japanese: 泣くなジャイ子よ)	June 2, 2006
99	"Jaiko's New Comic"; Transliteration: "Jaiko no Shinsaku Manga" (Japanese: ジャイ子の新作マンガ)	June 2, 2006
100	"The Lazy Day"; Transliteration: "Gūtara no Hi" (Japanese: ぐうたらの日)	June 9, 2006
101	"Aren't You Nobita, the Cat?"; Transliteration: "Neko no Nobita Irimasen ka" (Japanese: ネコののび太いりませんか)	June 9, 2006
102	"Swapping Moms"; Transliteration: "Mama o Torikaekko" (Japanese: ママをとりかえっこ)	June 16, 2006
103	"Nobita Disappeared?"; Transliteration: "Nobita ga Kiechau?" (Japanese: のび太が消えちゃう?)	June 16, 2006
104	"All Alone in the City of the Future"; Transliteration: "Mirai no Machi ni Tada Hitori" (Japanese: 未来の町にただ一人)	June 23, 2006
105	"The Schedule Clock"; Transliteration: "Sukejūru Dokei" (Japanese: スケジュールどけい)	June 23, 2006
106	"I'll Become a Singer By Eating Candy"; Transliteration: "Kyandī Namete Kashu ni Narō" (Japanese: キャンデーなめて歌手になろう)	June 30, 2006
107	"Memories of Grandma"; Transliteration: "Obāchan no Omoide" (Japanese: おばあちゃんの思い出)	June 30, 2006
108	"An Emotional, Heart-Touching Expression"; Transliteration: "Jīn to Kandōsuru Hanashi" (Japanese: ジーンと感動する話)	June 30, 2006
109	"The Just-As-You-Said Pills"; Transliteration: "Sōnarujō" (Japanese: ソウナルじょう)	July 7, 2006
110	"The World is Full of Lies"; Transliteration: "Yo no Naka Uso Darake" (Japanese: 世の中うそだらけ)	July 7, 2006
111	"Nobita's Castaway Story"; Transliteration: "Nobita Hyōryūki" (Japanese: のび太漂流記)	July 14, 2006
112	"Chip Pocket Two-dimensional Camera"; Transliteration: "Chippoketto Nijigen Kamera" (Japanese: チッポケット二次元カメラ)	July 14, 2006
113	"The Stupidity Time Bombs"; Transliteration: "Jigen Baka Dan" (Japanese: 時限バカ弾)	July 21, 2006
114	"The In-advance Diary is Horrible"; Transliteration: "Arakajime Nikki wa Osoroshii" (Japanese: あらかじめ日記はおそろしい)	July 21, 2006
115	"Assorted Monsters"; Transliteration: "Tsumeawase Obake" (Japanese: つめあわせオバケ)	July 28, 2006
116	"Which is a Lie! Our Sale"; Transliteration: "Docchi ga Uso ka! Awasēru" (Japanese: どっちがウソか！アワセール)	July 28, 2006
117	"What Are Those Two Doing, All Alone Together?"; Transliteration: "Futarikkiri de Nani Shiteru?" (Japanese: ふたりっきりでなにしてる？)	August 4, 2006
118	"Water Processing Sprinkle"; Transliteration: "Mizu Kakōyō Furikake" (Japanese: 水加工用ふりかけ)	August 4, 2006
119	"The Equality Bomb"; Transliteration: "Byōdō Bakudan" (Japanese: ビョードーばくだん)	August 18, 2006
120	"Please Save Me"; Transliteration: "Boku o Tasukeron" (Japanese: ぼくをタスケロン)	August 18, 2006
121	"Watercycline"; Transliteration: "Santain" (Japanese: サンタイン)	August 25, 2006
122	"The Reality Pillow"; Transliteration: "Utsutsu Makura" (Japanese: うつつまくら)	August 25, 2006
123	"Goodbye, Nobita! Doraemon, Goes Back To The Future"; Transliteration: "Nobita-kun, Sayounara! Doraemon, Mirai ni Kaeru" (Japanese: のび太くん、さようなら！ ドラえもん、未来へ帰る…)	September 1, 2006
124	"Doraemon's Song"; Transliteration: "Doraemon no Uta" (Japanese: ドラえもんの歌)	September 8, 2006
125	"Lighter Play"; Transliteration: "Raitā Shibai" (Japanese: ライター芝居)	September 8, 2006
126	"What!! Nobita Got 100 Points"; Transliteration: "Na, nanto! ! No bi Dai ga hyaku-ten totta" (Japanese: な、なんと！！のび太が百点とった)	September 22, 2006
127	"The Devil Card"; Transliteration: "debirukādo" (Japanese: デビルカード)	September 22, 2009
128	"The Light or Heavy Meter"; Transliteration: "Funwari zusshirimētā" (Japanese: ふんわりズッシリメーター)	October 20, 2006
129	"The Strange Encounter Machine"; Transliteration: "michitonosōgūki" (Japanese: 未知とのそうぐう機)	October 20, 2006
130	"The Absconding Leaf"; Transliteration: "Doronpa" (Japanese: ドロン葉)	October 27, 2006
131	"God Robot Extends His Hand of Love!"; Transliteration: "kamisamarobotto ni ai no te o!" (Japanese: 神さまロボットに愛の手を！)	October 27, 2006
132	"The Tax Bird"; Transliteration: "Zeikintori" (Japanese: 税金鳥)	November 3, 2006
133	"Invisibility Eye Drop"; Transliteration: "tōmeiningenmegusuri" (Japanese: とう明人間目ぐすり)	November 3, 2006
134	"The Confidence Eliminator"; Transliteration: "Jishin guratsu ki" (Japanese: 自信ぐらつ機)	November 10, 2006
135	"The Bad Luck Diamond"; Transliteration: "akuundaiya" (Japanese: 悪運ダイヤ)	November 10, 2006
136	"The Fearsome Justice Rope"; Transliteration: "Osorubeki seigi rōpu" (Japanese: おそるべき正義ロープ)	November 17, 2006
137	"The Mini Hot-Air Balloon"; Transliteration: "mininetsukikyū" (Japanese: ミニ熱気球)	November 17, 2006
138	"The Four-Dimensional Building Extension Blocks"; Transliteration: "Yojigentatemashiburokku" (Japanese: 四次元たてましブロック)	November 24, 2006
139	"The Conclusion Yarn"; Transliteration: "musubinoito" (Japanese: むすびの糸)	November 24, 2006
140	"The Urashima Candy"; Transliteration: "Urashimakyandī" (Japanese: ウラシマキャンディー)	December 1, 2006
141	"Doraemon and Dorami-chan"; Transliteration: "Doraemon to dorami-chan" (Japanese: ドラえもんとドラミちゃん)	December 1, 2006
142	"The Devil Passport"; Transliteration: "Akuma no pasupōto" (Japanese: 悪魔のパスポート)	December 8, 2006
143	"The Cute Rock Story"; Transliteration: "kawaī ishikoro no hanashi" (Japanese: かわいい石ころの話)	December 8, 2006
144	"Go! Nobita Man"; Transliteration: "Ike! Nobitaman" (Japanese: 行け！ノビタマン)	December 31, 2006

== 2007 ==
No.	Title	Original release date
145	"The What-If Phone Box"; Transliteration: "Moshimo bokkusu" (Japanese: もしもボックス)	January 12, 2007
146	"Winning Back Shizuka-chan (Part 1)"; Transliteration: "shizukachan o torimodose (zenpen)" (Japanese: しずかちゃんをとりもどせ （前編）)	January 12, 2007
147	"Winning Back Shizuka-chan (Part 2)"; Transliteration: "Shizukachan o torimodose (kōhen)" (Japanese: しずかちゃんを とりもどせ(後編))	January 19, 2007
148	"Oh, Lovely Mii-chan!"; Transliteration: "sutekinamīchan" (Japanese: すてきなミイちゃん)	January 19, 2007
149	"The Sleeping Genius Nobita"; Transliteration: "Nemuri no tensai Nobita" (Japanese: ねむりの天才のび太)	January 26, 2007
150	"Robinson Crusoe Set"; Transliteration: "robinsonkurūsōsetto" (Japanese: ロビンソンクルーソーセット)	January 26, 2007
151	"The Lie Speaker"; Transliteration: "Atokarahontosupīkā" (Japanese: アトカラホントスピーカー)	February 2, 2007
152	"Big Problem! Suneo's Test Paper"; Transliteration: "dai pinchi! Suneotto no tōan" (Japanese: 大ピンチ！ スネ夫の答案)	February 2, 2007
153	"The Worldwide Flood"; Transliteration: "Sekai chinbotsu" (Japanese: 世界沈没)	February 9, 2007
154	"The Couple Test Badges"; Transliteration: "kappurutesutobajji" (Japanese: カップルテストバッジ)	February 9, 2007
155	"Exploring the Earth (Part 1)"; Transliteration: "Chitei no kuni tanken (zenpen)" (Japanese: 地底の国探検(前編))	February 16, 2007
156	"Exploring the Earth (Part 2)"; Transliteration: "Chitei no kuni tanken (kōhen)" (Japanese: 地底の国探検(後編))	February 23, 2007
157	"Blind Spot Star"; Transliteration: "Mōten hoshi" (Japanese: モーテン星)	March 2, 2007
158	"The Wolf Family"; Transliteration: "ōkami ikka" (Japanese: オオカミ一家)	March 2, 2007
159	"A World Without Mirrors"; Transliteration: "Kagami no nai sekai" (Japanese: かがみのない世界)	March 9, 2007
-	"Doraemon: Nobita's Dinosaur 2006"	March 10, 2007
160	"There's No Way We Can Produce a Cartoon"; Transliteration: "Anime seisaku nante wakenai yo" (Japanese: アニメ制作なんてわけないよ)	March 16, 2007
161	"Nobita's Black Hole"; Transliteration: "Nobita no burakkuhōru" (Japanese: のび太のブラックホール)	March 16, 2007
162	"Sorcerer Nobita"; Transliteration: "Mahōtsukai Nobita" (Japanese: 魔法使いのび太)	March 23, 2007
163	"The Secret of the Devil King's Castle"; Transliteration: "akuma no shiro no himitsu" (Japanese: 悪魔の城のヒミツ)	March 23, 2007
164	"The Prologue: New Great Adventure into the Underworld"; Transliteration: "joshō shinmakaidaibōken" (Japanese: 序章・新魔界大冒険)	March 23, 2007
165	"The Girl With the Red Shoes"; Transliteration: "Aka ikutsu no on'nanoko" (Japanese: 赤いくつの女の子)	April 20, 2007
166	"The Jaws of the Vacant Lot"; Transliteration: "akichi no jōzu" (Japanese: 空き地のジョーズ)	April 20, 2007
167	"Operation: Rescue Nobita"; Transliteration: "Nobita kyūshutsu kesshi tanken-tai" (Japanese: のび太救出決死探検隊)	May 11, 2007
168	"Gratitude Halo"; Transliteration: "Arigatāya" (Japanese: アリガターヤ)	May 18, 2007
169	"That Person's Living Room"; Transliteration: "anohitohaima" (Japanese: あの人は居間)	May 18, 2007
170	"Magical Girl Shizu-chan"; Transliteration: "Majo-kko shizuchan" (Japanese: 魔女っ子しずちゃん)	May 25, 2007
171	"The Secret of Shizuka-chan's Heart"; Transliteration: "shizukachan no kokoro no himitsu" (Japanese: しずかちゃんの心の秘密)	May 25, 2007
172	"Super Gian, Hero of Justice"; Transliteration: "Seigi no Hīrō Sūpā Jaian" (Japanese: 正義のヒーロー スーパージャイアン)	June 1, 2007
173	"Owl Man, Hero of Justice"; Transliteration: "Seigi no Hīrō Fukuro Man Sūtsu" (Japanese: 正義のヒーロー フクロマン)	June 1, 2007
174	"Could You Please Adopt Doraemon?"; Transliteration: "Doraemon kaimasen ka?" (Japanese: ドラえもん飼いませんか？)	June 8, 2007
175	"The Horrors of Gian's Birthday"; Transliteration: "Kyōfu no jaian tanjōbi" (Japanese: 恐怖のジャイアン誕生日)	June 8, 2007
176	"The Horrors of Gian's Birthday Return"; Transliteration: "Kyōfu no jaian tanjōbi ritānzu" (Japanese: 恐怖のジャイアン誕生日 リターンズ)	June 15, 2007
177	"Gian is Beaten!?"; Transliteration: "jaian ga make chatta! ?" (Japanese: ジャイアンが負けちゃった!?)	June 15, 2007
178	"Seems-bad-but-not Spray"; Transliteration: "Nobita ga Pikaso ni! ? Heta uma supurē" (Japanese: のび太がピカソに!?へたうまスプレー)	June 22, 2007
179	"I'll Use the Savings I Don't Have!"; Transliteration: "shi tenai chokin o tsukatchao!" (Japanese: してない貯金を使っちゃお！)	June 22, 2007
180	"The Great Pirate Decisive Battle ~Love Romance of the Southern Sea~"; Transliteration: "~ Kaizoku daisakusen ~ Nankai no raburomansu ~" (Japanese: ～海賊大決戦 ～南海のラブロマンス～)	June 29, 2007
181	"The Horizon in Nobita's Room"; Transliteration: "Nobita no heya no chiheisen" (Japanese: のび太の部屋の地平線)	July 6, 2007
182	"Shizuka-chan, in an Egg"; Transliteration: "tama go no naka no shizukachan" (Japanese: たまごの中のしずかちゃん)	July 6, 2007
183	"The Pitch-Black Pop Stars"; Transliteration: "Ninki sutā ga makkuro ke" (Japanese: 人気スターがまっ黒け)	July 13, 2007
184	"The Forceful Athletic House"; Transliteration: "Muriyari asurechikku hausu" (Japanese: むりやりアスレチック・ハウス)	July 20, 2007
185	"A Cat Made a Company, Meow"; Transliteration: "neko ga kaisha o tsukutta nya" (Japanese: ネコが会社を作ったニャ)	July 20, 2007
186	"The Pool in the Clouds"; Transliteration: "Kumo no naka no pūru" (Japanese: 雲の中のプール)	July 27, 2007
187	"Scoop! Nobita's Secret Date"; Transliteration: "sukūpu! Nobita to himitsu no dēto" (Japanese: スクープ！ のび太と秘密のデート)	July 27, 2007
188	"The Elephant and the Uncle"; Transliteration: "Zō to ojisan" (Japanese: ぞうとおじさん)	August 10, 2007
189	"The Hungry Master-sama"; Transliteration: "Hara peko goshujin-sama" (Japanese: 腹ペコご主人さま)	August 17, 2007
190	"We're Gonna Steal Mom's Diamond"; Transliteration: "mama no daiya o nusumidase" (Japanese: ママのダイヤを盗み出せ)	August 17, 2007
191	"Be Careful About Buying From the Future"; Transliteration: "Mirai no kaimono wa goyōshin" (Japanese: 未来の買いものはご用心)	August 31, 2007
192	"Doraemon is Really Sick?"; Transliteration: "Doraemon ga jūbyō ni?" (Japanese: ドラえもんが重病に？)	August 31, 2007
193	"The Day Doraemon is Reborn"; Transliteration: "Doraemon ga umarekawaru hi" (Japanese: ドラえもんが生まれ変わる日)	September 7, 2007
194	"Don't Take My Jack"; Transliteration: "watashi no jakku o toranaide" (Japanese: 私のジャックをとらないで)	September 14, 2007
195	"Nobita Raises Princess Kaguya"; Transliteration: "Nobita ga sodateta kaguyahime" (Japanese: のび太が育てたかぐや姫)	September 14, 2007
196	"Monkey King is a Runner, Cinderella is a Helper"; Transliteration: "Otsu kai wa Songokū, zō kin-gake wa Shinderera" (Japanese: おつかいは孫悟空、 ぞうきんがけはシンデレラ)	September 21, 2007
197	"Nobita Becomes a Hermit!?"; Transliteration: "Nobita sen'nin ni naru! ?" (Japanese: のび太仙人になる!?)	September 21, 2007
198	"Fuko, The Typhoon"; Transliteration: "Taifū no fū-ko" (Japanese: 台風のフー子)	October 26, 2007
199	"The Pinocchio's Flower"; Transliteration: "Pinokionohana" (Japanese: ピノキオの花)	November 2, 2007
200	"Feudal Lord of the 21st Century"; Transliteration: "21 seiki no oto no sama" (Japanese: 21世紀のおとのさま)	November 2, 2007
201	"The Gourmet Table Cloth"; Transliteration: "Gurumetēburu kake" (Japanese: グルメテーブルかけ)	November 16, 2007
202	"The Snowman's Part-time Job"; Transliteration: "yukiotoko no arubaito" (Japanese: 雪男のアルバイト)	November 16, 2007
203	"I'm Mini Doraemon"; Transliteration: "Bokuminidoraemon" (Japanese: ぼくミニドラえもん)	November 30, 2007
204	"Looks, Strength, or IQ?"; Transliteration: "kao ka chikara ka IQ ka" (Japanese: 顔か力かIQか)	November 30, 2007
205	"Save the Prince! The Legend of Dorami and the Three Swordsmen"; Transliteration: "Ōji o mamore! Densetsu no dorami san kenshi" (Japanese: 王子を守れ！ 伝説のドラミ三剣士)	December 7, 2007
206	"Nobita's Small, Small Great Adventure"; Transliteration: "Nobita no chīsana chīsana dai bōken" (Japanese: のび太の小さな小さな大冒険)	December 31, 2007
207	"It's Almost the Year of the Mouse, Doraemon"; Transliteration: "mōsugu nezumi-nenda yo, Doraemon" (Japanese: もうすぐネズミ年だよ、ドラえもん)	December 31, 2007
208	"Warring States Period Dora Jizo"; Transliteration: "sengoku jidai no dora jizō" (Japanese: 戦国時代のドラ地蔵)	December 31, 2007

== 2008 ==
No.	Title	Original release date
209	"Electric Shock Trade"; Transliteration: "Dengekitorēdo" (Japanese: デンゲキトレード)	January 11, 2008
210	"Sweets Ranch"; Transliteration: "okashi bokujō" (Japanese: おかし牧場)	January 11, 2008
211	"The Big "Stop Being Late" Plan"; Transliteration: "Chi koku sutoppu dai sakusen" (Japanese: ちこくストップ大作戦)	January 18, 2008
212	"Defeat Gian! The Magic Spell"; Transliteration: "datō jaian! Mahō no jumon" (Japanese: 打倒ジャイアン！魔法の呪文)	January 18, 2008
213	"Nobita + Pigeon = ?"; Transliteration: "Nobita + hato =?" (Japanese: のび太+ハト = ？)	January 25, 2008
214	"Strong Stone"; Transliteration: "Tsuyo ~ i ishi" (Japanese: 強～いイシ)	January 25, 2008
215	"Suneo Goes to the Beauty Salon"; Transliteration: "Suneotto, miyōin e iku" (Japanese: スネ夫，美容院へ行く)	February 1, 2008
216	"Goodbye, Suneo..."; Transliteration: "sayōnara suneotto…" (Japanese: さようならスネ夫…)	February 1, 2008
217	"Nobita, Gunfighter of the Cosmos (Part 1)"; Transliteration: "Uchū ganfaitā Nobita (zenpen)" (Japanese: 宇宙ガンファイターのび太 (前編))	February 8, 2008
218	"Nobita, Gunfighter of the Cosmos (Part 2)"; Transliteration: "Uchū ganfaitā Nobita (kōhen)" (Japanese: 宇宙ガンファイターのび太 (後編))	February 15, 2008
219	"Stand to Sergeant Nobita's Attention!"; Transliteration: "Nobita taichō ni kei rei!" (Japanese: のび太隊長にけい礼！)	February 22, 2008
220	"Dekisugi's Genius Rocket Operation"; Transliteration: "Tensai-de kisugi no roketto keikaku" (Japanese: 天才・出木杉のロケット計画)	February 22, 2008
221	"The Invincible, Ultra-Special-Mighty-Strong-Super Armor"; Transliteration: "Muteki no urutora supesharu maiti suto rongu sūpā yoroi" (Japanese: 無敵のウルトラ・スペシャル・マイティ・ストロング・スーパーよろい)	February 29, 2008
222	"The Spirit Nobita Loved"; Transliteration: "Nobita ni koi shita seirei" (Japanese: のび太に恋した精霊)	February 29, 2008
223	"What I Can Do For Momotaro 2008"; Transliteration: "Boku, Momotarō no nan'na no sa 2008"" (Japanese: ぼく、桃太郎のなんなのさ2008)	March 7, 2008
224	"The Forest is Alive"; Transliteration: "Mori haikiteiru" (Japanese: 森は生きている)	March 14, 2008
225	"Special Effects Ultra Dora-Man"; Transliteration: "Tokusatsu uradoraman" (Japanese: 特撮ウラドラマン)	March 21, 2008
-	"Doraemon: Nobita's New Great Adventure into the Underworld"	March 21, 2008
226	"Kibo is in Love"; Transliteration: "Kī bō ga koi o shita" (Japanese: キー坊が恋をした)	March 28, 2008
227	"The Another "Green Giant Legend""; Transliteration: "mō hitotsu no "midorinokyojinden"" (Japanese: もうひとつの"緑の巨人伝")	March 28, 2008
228	"Jekyll and Hyde"; Transliteration: "jikiruhaido" (Japanese: ジキルハイド)	March 28, 2008
229	"The Day When I Was Born"; Transliteration: "Boku no umaretahi" (Japanese: ぼくの生まれた日)	April 25, 2008
230	"Goodbye to You"; Transliteration: "Tameshi ni sayōnara" (Japanese: ためしにさようなら)	May 2, 2008
231	"Doraemon VS Dracula (Part 1)"; Transliteration: "Doraemon vs dorakyura (zenpen)" (Japanese: ドラえもんvsドラキュラ（前編))	May 9, 2008
232	"Doraemon VS Dracula (Part 2)"; Transliteration: "Doraemon vs dorakyura (kōhen)" (Japanese: ドラえもんvsドラキュラ（後編))	May 16, 2008
233	"Dramatic Gas"; Transliteration: "Doramachikkugasu" (Japanese: ドラマチックガス)	May 23, 2008
234	"Say "Nobita is Smart" Again!"; Transliteration: "Nobita wa Erai! wo Mō Ichido" (Japanese: のび太はエライ!をもう一度)	May 23, 2008
235	"Shizuka-chan's Present is Nobita"; Transliteration: "Shizukachan e no purezento wa Nobita" (Japanese: しずかちゃんへのプレゼントはのび太)	May 30, 2008
236	"Real Life Video Game From the Future"; Transliteration: "Mirai no Hommono Gēmu" (Japanese: 未来の本物ゲーム)	June 6, 2008
237	"Nobita, the Great Detective"; Transliteration: "Meitantei Nobita" (Japanese: 迷探偵のび太)	June 6, 2008
238	"Build a Subway for Father's Day"; Transliteration: "Chichi no Hi ni Chikatetsu wo" (Japanese: 父の日に地下鉄を)	June 13, 2008
239	"Gian, in Love (Part 1)"; Transliteration: "Koi Suru Jaian (zenpen)" (Japanese: 恋するジャイアン（前編）)	June 13, 2008
240	"Gian, in Love (Part 2)"; Transliteration: "Koi Suru Jaian (kōhen)" (Japanese: 恋するジャイアン（後編）)	June 20, 2008
241	"Let's Go See the Ocean in a Submarine"; Transliteration: "Sensuikan de Umi e Ikō" (Japanese: せん水艦で海に行こう)	June 20, 2008
242	"The Sleeping Sea Kingdom"; Transliteration: "Nemuru Umi no Ōkoku" (Japanese: 眠る海の王国)	June 27, 2008
243	"Star Wars of the Star Festival"; Transliteration: "Tanabata no Uchū Sensō" (Japanese: 七夕の宇宙戦争)	July 11, 2008
244	"Someone Who's an Even Bigger Failure in Life Than Me Showed Up"; Transliteration: "Boku yori Dame na Yatsu ga Kita" (Japanese: ぼくよりダメなやつが来た)	July 18, 2008
245	"My Spirit Bodyguard"; Transliteration: "Bodī Gādo wa Haigorei" (Japanese: ボディガードは背後霊)	July 18, 2008
246	"Multiplication Liquid"; Transliteration: "Baibain" (Japanese: バイバイン)	July 25, 2008
247	"Goodbye, Hana-chan"; Transliteration: "Sayonara Hana-chan" (Japanese: さよならハナちゃん)	July 25, 2008
248	"But, I Saw a Ghost!"; Transliteration: "Shikashi Yūrei wa Deta!" (Japanese: しかしユーレイはでた！)	August 1, 2008
249	"My Birthday's The Same As Always"; Transliteration: "Tanjōbi wa Keikakuteki ni" (Japanese: 誕生日は計画的に)	August 8, 2008
250	"The Life Do-Over Machine"; Transliteration: "Jinsei Yarinaoshiki" (Japanese: 人生やりなおし機)	August 8, 2008
251	"The Stone Age Hotel"; Transliteration: "Sekki Jidai no Hoteru" (Japanese: 石器時代のホテル)	August 15, 2008
252	"Facing the Gians"; Transliteration: "Jaianzu o Buttobase" (Japanese: ジャイアンズをぶっとばせ)	August 22, 2008
253	"Recoloring the World"; Transliteration: "Sekai o Nurikae yō" (Japanese: 世界をぬりかえよう)	August 29, 2008
254	"Doraemon Takes a Day Off!!"; Transliteration: "Doraemon ni Kyūjitsu o!!" (Japanese: ドラえもんに休日を！！)	August 29, 2008
255	"Doraemon's Blue Tears"; Transliteration: "Doraemon no Aoi Namida" (Japanese: ドラえもんの青い涙)	September 5, 2008
256	"The Adventure Tea"; Transliteration: "Adoben-cha" (Japanese: アドベン茶)	September 12, 2008
257	"Fortune Telling Through Tongue Reading"; Transliteration: "Berosō Uranai de Ō Atari!!" (Japanese: ベロ相うらないで大当たり)	September 12, 2008
258	"Nobita Spends 3000 Days on a Deserted Island"; Transliteration: "Nobita ga Mujintō de Sanzennichi" (Japanese: のび太が無人島で3000日)	September 19, 2008
259	"Nobi-Robo Comes in Handy"; Transliteration: "Nobi Robo wa Yakutatazu" (Japanese: のびロボは役立たず)	October 17, 2008
260	"Nobita's Encounter Catalog"; Transliteration: "Nobita no Deai Katarogu" (Japanese: のび太の出会いはカタログ)	October 17, 2008
261	"Hiking on the Ocean Floor"; Transliteration: "Kaitei Haikingu" (Japanese: 海底ハイキング)	October 24, 2008
262	"Nobita and Friend's Ice Show"; Transliteration: "Nobita Tachi no Aisu Shō" (Japanese: のび太たちのアイスショー)	October 24, 2008
263	"The Rumors of Love Just Won't Stop"; Transliteration: "Koi no Uwasa wa Yamerare nai" (Japanese: 恋のウワサはやめられない)	October 31, 2008
264	"Time, Keep Going!"; Transliteration: "Jikan yo Ugoke〜!!" (Japanese: 時間よ動け～っ！！)	October 31, 2008
265	"And So, We Left on a Journey"; Transliteration: "Soshite, Bokura wa Tabi ni Deta" (Japanese: そして、ボクらは旅に出た)	November 7, 2008
266	"Suneo's Incredible Fort"; Transliteration: "Suneo no Muteki Hōdai" (Japanese: スネ夫の無敵砲台)	November 14, 2008
267	"Even a Cushion Has a Soul"; Transliteration: "Zabuton nimo Tamashii ga Aru" (Japanese: ざぶとんにもたましいがある)	November 21, 2008
268	"Making a Little Brother"; Transliteration: "Otōto o Tsukurō" (Japanese: 弟をつくろう)	November 28, 2008
269	"Head Down to the Path of Evil"; Transliteration: "Aku no Michi o Susume!" (Japanese: 悪の道を進め！)	November 28, 2008
270	"Dorami's Worst Day Ever"; Transliteration: "Dorami no Saiaku no Ichinichi" (Japanese: ドラミの最悪の一日)	December 5, 2008
271	"The Best Melon Bread in the World"; Transliteration: "Sekaiichi no Meron-pan" (Japanese: 世界一のメロンパン)	December 5, 2008
272	"Our Homemade Giant Robot Loses Control"; Transliteration: "Ō Abare, Tezukuri Kyodai Robo" (Japanese: 大あばれ、手作り巨大ロボ)	December 12, 2008
273	"Slope Cane"; Transliteration: "Korogaru Saka no Tsue" (Japanese: ころがる坂のつえ)	December 19, 2008
274	"Nobita's 0-Point Escape Plan"; Transliteration: "Nobita no Reiten Dasshutsu Sakusen" (Japanese: のび太の0点脱出作戦)	December 19, 2008
275	"Moving to a Haunted Castle"; Transliteration: "Yūrei-jō e Hikkoshi" (Japanese: ゆうれい城へひっこし)	December 31, 2008
276	"The Nobi's Residence is Weightless"; Transliteration: "Nobi-ke ga Mujūryoku" (Japanese: 野比家が無重力)	December 31, 2008
277	"Only Four More Hours Until the Mice Are Driven Away"; Transliteration: "Nezumi ga Saru Made Ato Yojikan" (Japanese: ネズミが去るまであと4時間)	December 31, 2008

== 2009 ==
No.	Title	Original release date
278	"Nobizaemon's Treasure"; Transliteration: "Nobizaemon no Hihō" (Japanese: のび左エ門の秘宝)	January 9, 2009
279	"The Tale of Nobita's Dream"; Transliteration: "Nobita no yumemonogatari" (Japanese: のび太の夢物語)	January 16, 2009
280	"Half, and Half, and Half Again"; Transliteration: "Hanbun no Hanbun no Mata Hanbun" (Japanese: 半分の半分のまた半分)	January 23, 2009
281	"That Day, That Time, and That Daruma"; Transliteration: "Ano hi Ano Toki Ano Daruma" (Japanese: あの日あの時あのダルマ)	January 23, 2009
-	"Doraemon: Nobita and the Green Giant Legend"	February 6, 2009
282	"Nobita and Shizuka's House of Love"; Transliteration: "Nobita to Shizuka no Ai no Ie" (Japanese: のび太としずかの愛の家)	February 13, 2009
283	"Summoning in Victory With the Cheerleader Gloves"; Transliteration: "Shōri wo Yobu Chiarīdā Tebukuro" (Japanese: 勝利をよぶチアリーダーてぶくろ)	February 13, 2009
284	"The Mystery of Yamaoku Village"; Transliteration: "Yama Oku Mura no Kai Jiken" (Japanese: 山おく村の怪事件)	February 20, 2009
285	"Fantasy Animal Safari Pack"; Transliteration: "Kūsō Dōbutsu Safari Pāku" (Japanese: 空想動物サファリパーク)	February 27, 2009
286	"Night of the Milky Way Railroad"; Transliteration: "Ama no Gawa Tetsudō no Yoru" (Japanese: 天の川鉄道の夜)	March 6, 2009
287	"A Visitor from the Country of the Future"; Transliteration: "Mirai Sekai nou Kaijin" (Japanese: 未来世界の怪人)	March 13, 2009
288	"Goodbye, Doraemon"; Transliteration: "Sayōnara Doraemon" (Japanese: さようならドラえもん)	March 20, 2009
289	"Nobita and the Star Floating Whale"; Transliteration: "Nobita to Hoshi o Nagasu Kujira" (Japanese: のび太と星を流すクジラ)	March 20, 2009
290	"Welcome to the Center of the Earth (Part 1)"; Transliteration: "Yōkoso, Chikyū no Chūshin e (Zenpen)" (Japanese: ようこそ、世界の中心へ (前編))	May 1, 2009
291	"Welcome to the Center of the Earth (Part 2)"; Transliteration: "Yōkoso, Chikyū no Chūshin e (Kisaki)" (Japanese: ようこそ、世界の中心へ (後編))	May 8, 2009
292	"Shizuka-chan Disappeared!?"; Transliteration: "Shizuka-chan ga Kieta!?" (Japanese: しずかちゃんが消えた!?)	May 15, 2009
293	"Nobita's Proposal Strategy"; Transliteration: "Nobita no Puropōzu Sakusen" (Japanese: のび太のプロポーズ作戦)	May 22, 2009
294	"Doraemon's on a Diet!?"; Transliteration: "Doraemon ga Daietto!?" (Japanese: ドラえもんがダイエット！？)	May 29, 2009
295	"The Nobi's Finances are in Big Trouble!"; Transliteration: "Nobi-ka no Kakei ga Dai Pinchi" (Japanese: 野比家の家計が大ピンチ)	May 29, 2009
296	"Masked Self, Hero of Justice"; Transliteration: "Seigi no Mikata Serufu Kamen" (Japanese: 正義の味方セルフ仮面)	June 5, 2009
297	"Gian, The Moocher"; Transliteration: "I Sōrō Jaian" (Japanese: いそうろうジャイアン)	June 12, 2009
298	"My Friend, the Topknot"; Transliteration: "Tomodachi ni Natte Chonmage" (Japanese: 友だちになってチョンマゲ)	June 12, 2009
299	"It's Tough To Be a Rain Man"; Transliteration: "Ame Otoko Hatsurai yo" (Japanese: 雨男はつらいよ)	June 19, 2009
300	"The Beautiful Girl that Nobita Loved"; Transliteration: "Nobita o Aishita Bishōjo" (Japanese: のび太を愛した美少女)	June 26, 2009
301	"Parallel Planet"; Transliteration: "Abekobe Wakusei" (Japanese: あべこべ惑星)	July 3, 2009
302	"The Suneo Kidnapping Case"; Transliteration: "Suneotto yū Kai Jiken" (Japanese: スネ夫ゆうかい事件)	July 10, 2009
303	"Doraemon's Resignation"; Transliteration: "Doraemon Yamemasu" (Japanese: ドラえもんやめます)	July 10, 2009
304	"Let's Ride a Bug Plane"; Transliteration: "Konchū Hikōki ni Norō" (Japanese: コンチュウ飛行機にのろう)	July 17, 2009
305	"How to Walk on the Sea Floor Without Getting in the Ocean"; Transliteration: "Umi ni Hairazu Kaitei o Sanpo Suru Hōhō" (Japanese: 海に入らず海底を散歩する方法)	July 24, 2009
306	"Winter Comes on a Midsummer's Day"; Transliteration: "Manatsu ni Fuyu ga Yattekita" (Japanese: 真夏に冬がやってきた)	July 24, 2009
307	"Like I Said, A Ghost Appeared"; Transliteration: "Dakara, Yūrei wa Deta" (Japanese: だから、ユーレイは出た)	July 31, 2009
308	"The Nobita in Nobita"; Transliteration: "Nobita no Naka no Nobita" (Japanese: のび太の中ののび太)	August 7, 2009
309	"A Happy Mermaid Princess"; Transliteration: "Shiawasena Ningyo Hime" (Japanese: 幸せな人魚姫)	August 14, 2009
310	"Doraemon, In Love"; Transliteration: "Koisuru Doraemon" (Japanese: 恋するドラえもん)	August 21, 2009
311	"Muku, the Bad Dog"; Transliteration: "Dame Inu, Muku" (Japanese: ダメ犬、ムク)	August 28, 2009
312	"The Robot Dwarfs are Hardworking"; Transliteration: "Kobi to Robotto wa Hataraki-sha!?" (Japanese: こびとロボットははたらき者！？)	August 28, 2009
313	"Nobita's The Only Creature on Earth"; Transliteration: "Nobita wa Sekai ni Tada Itsupiki" (Japanese: のび太は世界にただ一匹)	September 4, 2009
314	"Doraemon's Long Day"; Transliteration: "Doraemon no Nagai Tsuitachi" (Japanese: ドラえもんの長い一日)	September 11, 2009
315	"Big Rampage! Nobita's Baby"; Transliteration: "Dai Abare! Nobita no Akachan" (Japanese: 大あばれ！のび太の赤ちゃん)	September 18, 2009
316	"The Nobi House Turns Into a Giant Maze!?"; Transliteration: "Nobi-ka ga Kyodai Meiro ni!?" (Japanese: 野比家が巨大迷路に！？)	October 16, 2009
317	"Violetta of the Rainbow"; Transliteration: "Niji no Bioretta" (Japanese: 虹のビオレッタ)	October 16, 2009
318	"That Goodbye Through The Window"; Transliteration: "Ano Mado ni Sayōnara" (Japanese: あの窓にさようなら)	October 23, 2009
319	"Becoming Faceless with an Eraser"; Transliteration: "Keshigomu de Nopperabō" (Japanese: 消しゴムでのっぺらぼう)	October 30, 2009
320	"The Toy Soldiers"; Transliteration: "Omocha no Heitai" (Japanese: おもちゃの兵隊)	October 30, 2009
321	"Nobita's Sports Day Fever"; Transliteration: "Nekketsu! Nobita no Undōkai" (Japanese: 熱血！のび太の運動会)	November 6, 2009
322	"Follow That Alien!"; Transliteration: "Uchū Hito o Oi Kaese!" (Japanese: 宇宙人を追いかえせ！)	November 13, 2009
323	"The Terror of Gian's Dinner Show"; Transliteration: "Kyōfu no Jaian Dinā Shō" (Japanese: (恐怖のジャイアンディナーショー)	November 20, 2009
324	"Once in a While, Nobita Can Think, Too"; Transliteration: "Nobita mo Tamani wa Kangaeru" (Japanese: のび太もたまには考える)	November 20, 2009
325	"Fine Dog!? Chukenper"; Transliteration: "Meiken!? Chūkenpā" (Japanese: 名犬!?チューケンパー)	November 27, 2009
326	"A Black Hole in Nobita's Town"; Transliteration: "Nobita no Machi ni Burakku Hōru" (Japanese: のび太の町にブラックホール)	December 4, 2009
327	"What are Gian's Good Points?"; Transliteration: "Jaian no ī Tokoro wa Doko?" (Japanese: ジャイアンのいい所はどこ？)	December 4, 2009
328	"Nobita Claus on Christmas Eve"; Transliteration: "Seiya no Nobita Kurōsu" (Japanese: 聖夜ののび太クロース)	December 11, 2009
-	"Dorami the Match Seller"; Transliteration: "Matchi Uri no Dorami" (Japanese: マッチ売りのドラミ)	December 11, 2009
329	"Chase the Dorayaki Legend!"; Transliteration: "Dorayaki Densetsu o Oe!" (Japanese: どら焼き伝説を追え！)	December 31, 2009
330	"45 Years Later... My Future Self Came to Visit"; Transliteration: "45-Nen Kisaki...〜Mirai no Boku ga Yattekita 〜" (Japanese: 45年後…～未来のぼくがやって来た～)	December 31, 2009

== 2010 ==
No.	Title	Original release date
331	"The Long, Long, New Years"; Transliteration: "Nagai Nagai Oshōgatsu" (Japanese: 長い長いお正月)	January 8, 2010
332	"Mass Panic! It's Super Baby"; Transliteration: "Dai Panikku! Sūpā Akachan" (Japanese: 大パニック！スーパー赤ちゃん)	January 15, 2010
333	"With the Compliments, I Can Become An Artist"; Transliteration: "Homereba Nobita mo Geiji Yutsu-ka" (Japanese: ほめればのび太も芸じゅつ家)	January 22, 2010
334	"Life Course, Left or Right"; Transliteration: "Migi ka Hidari ka Jinsei Kōsu" (Japanese: 右か左か人生コース)	January 22, 2010
335	"The Wild Man Headband"; Transliteration: "Kazenoko Bando" (Japanese: 風の子バンド)	January 29, 2010
336	"The Wish Realizing Machine Is Too Much!"; Transliteration: "Yarisugi! Nozomi Jitsugenki" (Japanese: やりすぎ！のぞみ実現機)	January 29, 2010
337	"Suneo's Luxuriously Poor Birthday!"; Transliteration: "Ōsutoraria! Suneo no Binbō Bāsudē" (Japanese: 豪華！スネ夫の貧乏バースデー)	February 5, 2010
338	"Don't Stop the Teacher From Slipping!"; Transliteration: "Tsururin! Sensei ga Tomaranai" (Japanese: ツルリン！先生がとまらない)	February 19, 2010
339	"Millionaire Nobita"; Transliteration: "Daifūgō Nobita" (Japanese: 大富豪のび太)	February 19, 2010
340	"Nobita's Mermaid Legend"; Transliteration: "Nobita no Ningyo Densetsu" (Japanese: のび太の人魚伝説)	March 5, 2010
341	"Moving with the Completely-Flat Roller"; Transliteration: "Petanko Rōrā de o Hikkoshi" (Japanese: ペタンコローラーでおひっこし)	March 12, 2010
342	"Nobita Grows Octopuses on His Ears"; Transliteration: "Nobita no Mimi ni Tako ga Dekiru Hanashi" (Japanese: のび太の耳にタコができる話)	March 12, 2010
343	"The Great Battle of the Breaking Neighborhood"; Transliteration: "Chōnai Toppa Daisakusen" (Japanese: 町内突破大作戦)	March 19, 2010
-	"Doraemon: The Record of Nobita's Spaceblazer"	March 19, 2010
344	"Nobita's Survival Trip"; Transliteration: "Nobita no Ensoku Sabaibaru" (Japanese: のび太の遠足サバイバル)	April 23, 2010
345	"The Curse of the Laughing Doll"; Transliteration: "Noroi no Warai Ningyō" (Japanese: 呪いのワラい人形)	April 30, 2010
346	"The Long, Slender Friend"; Transliteration: "Hosoku Nagai Tomodachi" (Japanese: 細く長い友だち)	April 30, 2010
347	"Long Ago, Mom Was Just Like Nobita!?"; Transliteration: "Mukashi no Mama wa Nobita!?" (Japanese: むかしのママはのび太！？)	May 7, 2010
348	"Create Gian's Fear"; Transliteration: "Jaian ni Nigate o Tsukure" (Japanese: ジャイアンに苦手を作れ)	May 14, 2010
349	"Create Dekisugi's Fear, Too"; Transliteration: "Dekisugi ni mo Nigate o Tsukure" (Japanese: 出木杉にも苦手を作れ)	May 14, 2010
350	"Shizuka-chan and the Grandfather Tree"; Transliteration: "Shizuka-chan to Ojī no Ki" (Japanese: しずかちゃんとおじいの木)	May 21, 2010
351	"Abekonbe"; Transliteration: "Abekonbe" (Japanese: アベコンベ)	May 28, 2010
352	"The Nobita that Nobita Never Knew"; Transliteration: "Nobita no Shiranai Nobita" (Japanese: のび太の知らないのび太)	May 28, 2010
353	"Where'd Cinderella Go?"; Transliteration: "Shinderera wa Doko Itta?" (Japanese: シンデレラはどこいった？)	June 4, 2010
354	"Grandpa, In the Midst of a Dream"; Transliteration: "Yume Makura no Ojīsan" (Japanese: 夢まくらのおじいさん)	June 11, 2010
355	"There are 1000 Gians!?"; Transliteration: "Jaian ga Issen Hito! ?" (Japanese: ジャイアが1000人！？)	June 25, 2010
356	"I'm Honekawa Doraemon"; Transliteration: "Boku, Honekawa Doraemon" (Japanese: ぼく、骨川ドラえもん)	July 2, 2010
357	"Going for a Vacuum Cleaner Drive"; Transliteration: "Doraibu wa Zōjiki ni Notte" (Japanese: ドライブは掃除機にのって)	July 2, 2010
358	"I Caught a Sea Monster"; Transliteration: "Umibōzu ga Tsureta!" (Japanese: 海坊主がつれた！)	July 9, 2010
359	"The House Became a Robot"; Transliteration: "Ie ga Robotto ni Natta" (Japanese: 家がロボットになった)	July 9, 2010
360	"The Story of Taking Off Your Body's Skin"; Transliteration: "Karada no Kawa o Hagu Hanashi" (Japanese: からだの皮をはぐ話)	July 16, 2010
361	"Jaiko and Dorami Have Boyfriends!?"; Transliteration: "Jaiko to Dorami ni Koibito" (Japanese: ジャイ子とドラミに恋人！？)	July 16, 2010
362	"Welcome to Ghost Inn!"; Transliteration: "Obake Ryokan e Yōkoso!" (Japanese: オバケ旅館へようこそ！)	July 30, 2010
363	"Nobita's Birthday Adventure Journal"; Transliteration: "Nobita no Tanjōbi Bōken-ki" (Japanese: のび太の誕生日冒険記)	August 6, 2010
364	"Swapping Bodies with Everyone"; Transliteration: "Minna de Karada o Torikaekko" (Japanese: みんなで体をとりかえっこ)	August 13, 2010
365	"Swimming Powder"; Transliteration: "Donburako" (Japanese: ドンブラ粉)	August 13, 2010
366	"The Treasure of Skull Island"; Transliteration: "Dokuro Shima no Hihō" (Japanese: ドクロ島の秘宝)	August 20, 2010
367	"Transform, Transform, and Transform Again"; Transliteration: "Henshin, Henshin, Mata Henshin" (Japanese: 変身、変身、また変身)	August 27, 2010
368	"Little House on the Big Iceberg"; Transliteration: "Dai Hyōzan no Chīsana Ie" (Japanese: 大氷山の小さな家)	August 27, 2010
369	"Battle! Cat-Model Robots vs. Dog-Model Robots"; Transliteration: "Kessen! Neko-gata Robotto VS Inu-gata Robotto" (Japanese: 決戦！ネコ型ロボットvsイヌ型ロボット)	September 3, 2010
370	"Flying Through the Sky on the Word "WOW""; Transliteration: "Wa no Ji de Sora o Iku" (Japanese: ワの字で空を行く)	September 10, 2010
371	"Transform with the Dracula Set!"; Transliteration: "Henshin! Dorakyura Setto" (Japanese: 変身！ドラキュラセット)	September 10, 2010
372	"A Real 3D TV"; Transliteration: "Honmono Surī Dī Terebi" (Japanese: ほんもの3Dテレビ)	September 17, 2010
373	"On That Day, Everything Turned Into Mice!"; Transliteration: "Sono Hi, Subete ga Nezumi ni" (Japanese: その日、すべてがネズミに)	September 17, 2010
374	"The Mystery of Goodie Land"; Transliteration: "Meikyū okashi rando" (Japanese: 迷宮お菓子ランド)	October 15, 2010
375	"The Country of Ichi, the Puppy ~Bonding~"; Transliteration: "Koinu Ichi no Kuni ~Kizuna hen~" (Japanese: 子犬イチの国 〜キズナ編〜)	October 22, 2010
376	"The Country of Ichi, the Puppy ~Hope~"; Transliteration: "Koinu Ichi no Kuni ~Kibou-hen~" (Japanese: 子犬イチの国 〜キボウ編〜)	October 29, 2010
377	"Let's Go to a Hot Spring With Shizuka-chan"; Transliteration: "Shizuka-chan to Onsen e Ikō" (Japanese: しずかちゃんと温泉へ行こう)	November 12, 2010
378	"But Doraemon Wants a Mom"; Transliteration: "Doraemon datte Mama ga Hoshī" (Japanese: ドラえもんだってママがほしい)	November 12, 2010
379	"I'll Be the King of String Finger World"; Transliteration: "Ayatori Sekai no Ōsama ni" (Japanese: あやとり世界の王様に)	November 19, 2010
380	"The Terror of Jaiko's Curry"; Transliteration: "Kyōfu no Jaiko Karē" (Japanese: 恐怖のジャイ子カレー)	December 3, 2010
381	"Procrastinating With the Sooner-or-Later Chestnut"; Transliteration: "Agesage Kuri de Atomawashi" (Japanese: 上げ下げくりであとまわし)	December 3, 2010
382	"Nobita's Big Radish Battle"; Transliteration: "Nobita no Daikon Daisakusen" (Japanese: のび太のだいこん大決戦)	December 10, 2010
383	"Santa Claus, the Thief Who Came on Christmas Eve"; Transliteration: "Seiya no Dorobō Santa Kurōsu" (Japanese: 聖夜のドロボーサンタクロース)	December 17, 2010
-	"Dorami Theater: Rapunzel, the princess in the Tower"; Transliteration: "Dorami Gekijō ~Tō no Naka no Ohimesama~" (Japanese: ドラミ劇場～塔の中のお姫様～)	December 17, 2010

== 2011 ==
No.	Title	Original release date
-	"Doraemon: Nobita's Dinosaur 2006"	January 3, 2011
384	"Flying Through the Sky! The Nobi Family's Kotatsu"; Transliteration: "Soratobu! Nobi-ka no kotatsu" (Japanese: 空飛ぶ！野比家のコタツ)	January 14, 2011
385	"Nobita's Pet is a Paper Dog!?"; Transliteration: "Nobita no petto wa kami no inu! ?" (Japanese: のび太のペットは紙のイヌ！？)	January 21, 2011
386	"Nobita's Town Becomes a Snowy Mountain"; Transliteration: "Nobita no machi ga yukiyama ni" (Japanese: のび太の町が雪山に)	January 28, 2011
387	"Gian's House's Extreme Makeover"; Transliteration: "Jaian no ie o dai kaizō" (Japanese: ジャイアンの家を大改造)	February 4, 2011
388	"Nobita Becomes a Sticker!?"; Transliteration: "Nobita ni naru shīru! ?" (Japanese: のび太になるシール！？)	February 4, 2011
389	"Doraemon's Everywhere"; Transliteration: "Doraemon-darake" (Japanese: ドラえもんだらけ)	February 11, 2011
390	"The Mirror World"; Transliteration: "kagami no naka no sekai" (Japanese: 鏡の中の世界)	February 11, 2011
-	"Doraemon: Nobita's Great Battle of the Mermaid King"	February 11, 2011
391	"Running Away to the Cretaceous Period"; Transliteration: "Haku aki e iede" (Japanese: 白亜紀へ家出)	February 18, 2011
392	"Doraemon, Squared"; Transliteration: "Shikakui Doraemon" (Japanese: 四角いドラえもん)	February 25, 2011
393	"Vote for the Boss of the Brats!"; Transliteration: "gakitaishō ni ichi-pyō o!" (Japanese: ガキ大将に一票を！)	February 25, 2011
394	"Paul the Robot, Forever And Always"; Transliteration: "Robotto boro yo, eien ni" (Japanese: ロボット・ボロよ、永遠に)	March 4, 2011
395	"The Night Before Nobita's Wedding"; Transliteration: "Nobitanokekkonzen'ya" (Japanese: のび太の結婚前夜)	March 18, 2011
396	"Nobita's Confusing School Entrance Ceremony"; Transliteration: "Nobita no hachamecha nyūgakushiki" (Japanese: のび太のハチャメチャ入学式)	March 25, 2011
397	"The Woodcutter's Spring"; Transliteration: "Kikorinoizumi" (Japanese: きこりの泉)	April 8, 2011
398	"The Animal Transformation Biscuits"; Transliteration: "dōbutsuhenshinbisuketto" (Japanese: 動物変身ビスケット)	April 8, 2011
399	"Welcome! To the Nobi Hotel"; Transliteration: "Yōkoso! Nobi hoteru e" (Japanese: ようこそ！野比ホテルへ)	April 29, 2011
400	"I Can Only Speak the Truth"; Transliteration: "Hon'ne shika ienai" (Japanese: ホンネしか言えない)	April 29, 2011
401	"I Don't Like Shizuka-chan Being Like This!"; Transliteration: "Kon'na shizukachan iya!" (Japanese: こんなしずかちゃんイヤ！)	May 6, 2011
402	"The Fishing Pond for Things You Dropped"; Transliteration: "Otoshimono tsuri bori" (Japanese: 落とし物つりぼり)	May 13, 2011
403	"The Understanding and Thankfulness Machine"; Transliteration: "Arigatamiwakariki" (Japanese: ありがたみわかり機)	May 13, 2011
404	"The Troublesome Gulliver"; Transliteration: "Meiwaku garibā" (Japanese: めいわくガリバー)	May 20, 2011
405	"The Rumored Nobita"; Transliteration: "uwasa no Nobita" (Japanese: ウワサののび太)	May 20, 2011
406	"Nobita's Big River Otter Adventure"; Transliteration: "Kawauso Nobita no dai bōken" (Japanese: カワウソのび太の大冒険)	May 27, 2011
407	"The Wishing Star"; Transliteration: "Negai hoshi" (Japanese: ねがい星)	June 3, 2011
408	"The Big Popularity Pheromone Plan"; Transliteration: "motemotēru dai sakusen" (Japanese: モテモテール大作戦)	June 3, 2011
409	"Debut of a New Song! Gian, The Great?"; Transliteration: "Shinkyoku happyō! Jaian ni boeboe?" (Japanese: 新曲発表!ジャイアンにボエボエ？)	June 10, 2011
410	"Shizuka is Acting All Goofy?"; Transliteration: "Shizukachan ga oppekepē?" (Japanese: しずかちゃんがオッペケペー？)	June 17, 2011
411	"The Nobita That Stopped Me"; Transliteration: "Boku o tomeru Nobita" (Japanese: ぼくを止めるのび太)	June 17, 2011
412	"Memories of Grandma"; Transliteration: "O bāchan no omoide" (Japanese: おばあちゃんのおもいで)	June 24, 2011
413	"The Tanabata Sky Came Falling Down"; Transliteration: "Tanabata no sora ga ochite kita" (Japanese: 七夕の空が落ちてきた)	July 1, 2011
414	"The Nobi Family's Giant Tunafish"; Transliteration: "Nobi-ka no kyodai maguro" (Japanese: 野比家の巨大マグロ)	July 8, 2011
415	"I've Got a Spare Fourth Dimensional Pocket"; Transliteration: "yojigenpoketto ni supea ga atta noda" (Japanese: 四次元ポケットにスペアがあったのだ)	July 8, 2011
416	"Riding a Cloud to School"; Transliteration: "Kumo ni notte gakkō e" (Japanese: 雲にのって学校へ)	July 15, 2011
417	"My House is a Night Train"; Transliteration: "yakō ressha wa boku no ie" (Japanese: 夜行列車はぼくの家)	July 15, 2011
418	"Ultra Ring"; Transliteration: "Urutoraringu" (Japanese: ウルトラリング)	July 22, 2011
419	"It's Solved! The Dekisugi Case"; Transliteration: "kaiketsu! Shutsu kisugi jiken" (Japanese: 解決！出木杉事件)	July 22, 2011
420	"Nobita Becomes a Ghost"; Transliteration: "Nobita yūrei ni naru" (Japanese: のび太ユーレイになる)	August 5, 2011
421	"Pilark of the Puddle"; Transliteration: "mizutamari no piraruku" (Japanese: 水たまりのピラルク)	August 5, 2011
422	"The Gian Battery is Infinite"; Transliteration: "Jaian denchi wa bugendai" (Japanese: ジャイアン電池は無限大)	August 22, 2011
423	"The Cute Rock Story"; Transliteration: "kawaī ishikoro no hanashi" (Japanese: かわいい石ころの話)	August 12, 2011
424	"Gian Makes an Appearance on TV!"; Transliteration: "Jaian terebinideru!" (Japanese: ジャイアンテレビにでる！)	August 19, 2011
425	"Story Badges for a Hot Summer"; Transliteration: "Atsui natsu ni hao hanashi bajji" (Japanese: 暑い夏にはおはなしバッジ)	August 19, 2011
426	"That Lie is True"; Transliteration: "Sonousohonto" (Japanese: ソノウソホント)	August 26, 2011
427	"I 'Wanna Give' You My Everything"; Transliteration: "boku no subete o agetai" (Japanese: ぼくのすべてをアゲタイ)	August 26, 2011
428	"Doraemon's One-Day-Only Romance"; Transliteration: "Doraemon tatta tsuitachi no koi" (Japanese: ドラえもんたった一日の恋)	September 2, 2011
429	"Move Fast, Doraemon! The Galactic Grandprix"; Transliteration: "Hashire Doraemon! Ginga guranpuri" (Japanese: 走れドラえもん！銀河グランプリ)	September 9, 2011
430	"I Humbly Accept Your Good Points"; Transliteration: "Anata no yoi tokoro moraimasu" (Japanese: あなたの良い所もらいます)	October 7, 2011
431	"King Nobita is Undefiable"; Transliteration: "Nobita-ō ni wa sakaraenai" (Japanese: のび太王にはさからえない)	October 7, 2011
432	"Run! Bamboo Horse"; Transliteration: "Hashire! Umatake" (Japanese: 走れ！ウマタケ)	October 21, 2011
433	"Moonlight and Bug Voices"; Transliteration: "tsuki no hikari to mushi no koe" (Japanese: 月の光と虫の声)	October 21, 2011
434	"The Magic Lamp without a Genie"; Transliteration: "Ma jin no inai mahōnoranpu" (Japanese: まじんのいない魔法のランプ)	October 28, 2011
435	"Nobita's Ninja Training"; Transliteration: "Nobita no ninja shugyō" (Japanese: のび太の忍者修行)	October 28, 2011
436	"The Just-Like-It-Says-on-the-Tin Seashell Set"; Transliteration: "Sōnarukaisetto" (Japanese: そうなる貝セット)	November 4, 2011
437	"It's the Best! The Worst Possible Service"; Transliteration: "saikō! Saiakuna omotenashi" (Japanese: 最高！最悪なおもてなし)	November 4, 2011
438	"The Super Mobile Bathtub 1010"; Transliteration: "Sūpā idō furo 1010" (Japanese: スーパー移動風呂1010)	November 11, 2011
439	"Nobita Becomes Company President"; Transliteration: "Nobita shachō ni naru" (Japanese: のび太社長になる)	November 11, 2011
440	"The Mechanizing Machine"; Transliteration: "Kikaikaki" (Japanese: 機械化機)	November 18, 2011
441	"Stuff Only for You Gas"; Transliteration: "anata dake no mono gasu" (Japanese: あなただけのものガス)	November 18, 2011
442	"I'm Nobiko"; Transliteration: "Boku nobi-ko-chan" (Japanese: ボクのび子ちゃん)	November 25, 2011
443	"The Mecha Maker"; Transliteration: "meka mēkā" (Japanese: メカ・メーカー)	November 25, 2011
444	"The Rich Kid Mambo"; Transliteration: "O botcha manbo" (Japanese: おぼっちゃマンボ)	December 2, 2011
445	"The Lying Mirror"; Transliteration: "uso-tsuki kagami" (Japanese: うそつきかがみ)	December 2, 2011
446	"Giant Suneo Appears!"; Transliteration: "Kyodai suneotto ara waru!" (Japanese: 巨大スネ夫あらわる！)	December 9, 2011
447	"The King of Napping Championship"; Transliteration: "Hiru ne Ō senshuken" (Japanese: ひるね王選手権)	December 9, 2011
448	"The Anywhere Cannon"; Transliteration: "Dokodemotaihō" (Japanese: どこでも大ほう)	December 16, 2011
449	"Gravity Paint"; Transliteration: "jūryokupenki" (Japanese: 重力ペンキ)	December 16, 2011

== 2012 ==
No.	Title	Original release date
450	"Go Home, You Unwanted Guest!"; Transliteration: "Iyana okyaku o kaeshi chae" (Japanese: いやなお客を帰しちゃえ)	January 6, 2012
451	"Memorization Bread for Tests"; Transliteration: "tesutoniankipan" (Japanese: テストにアンキパン)	January 6, 2012
452	"The Around the World Quiz"; Transliteration: "Kuizu wa chikyū o meguru" (Japanese: クイズは地球をめぐる)	January 13, 2012
453	"Green Pepper Fields in the Attic"; Transliteration: "yaneura no pīman hata" (Japanese: 屋根裏のピーマン畑)	January 13, 2012
454	"The Good Mood Warmth Sticker!"; Transliteration: "Goki gen pokapokashīru" (Japanese: ごきげんポカポカシール)	January 20, 2012
455	"The Mom vs. Rich Mother Battle"; Transliteration: "mamamamabatoru zama su" (Japanese: ママママバトルざます)	January 20, 2012
456	"The Ultra Mixer"; Transliteration: "Urutoramikisā" (Japanese: ウルトラミキサー)	January 27, 2012
457	"All-Out Assault! The Sneeze Busters"; Transliteration: "totsugeki! Hakushonbasutāzu" (Japanese: 突撃！ハクションバスターズ)	January 27, 2012
458	"The "Out with the Demons" Beans"; Transliteration: "Onihasoto bīnzu" (Japanese: 鬼は外ビーンズ)	February 3, 2012
459	"Goodbye, Shizuka"; Transliteration: "shizukachan sayōnara" (Japanese: しずかちゃんさようなら)	February 3, 2012
460	"Gian Stew"; Transliteration: "Jaianshichū" (Japanese: ジャイアンシチュー)	February 10, 2012
461	"Grand Opening of the Animal Training Shop!"; Transliteration: "kaiten! Dōbutsu-kun ren-y" (Japanese: 開店！動物くんれん屋)	February 10, 2012
462	"The Warm Snowball Fight"; Transliteration: "Atta ka 〜 i yukigassen" (Japanese: あったか〜い雪合戦)	February 17, 2012
463	"Suneo Works Part-Time at Gouda's Goods"; Transliteration: "suneotto ga gōden shōten de arubaito" (Japanese: スネ夫が剛田商店でアルバイト)	February 17, 2012
464	"The Making of a Television Channel"; Transliteration: "Terebikyoku o hajimeta yo" (Japanese: テレビ局をはじめたよ)	February 24, 2012
465	"Freeze-Framing Him"; Transliteration: "aitsu o katame chae" (Japanese: あいつを固めちゃえ)	February 24, 2012
466	"Nobita Meets the Masked Queen"; Transliteration: "Nobita ga deatta kamen no joō" (Japanese: のび太が出会った仮面の女王)	March 2, 2012
-	"Doraemon: Nobita and the Island of Miracles—Animal Adventure"	March 3, 2012
467	"I'll Use the Nurse-to-Death Stick on You"; Transliteration: "Anata ni tsukushinbō" (Japanese: あなたにつくしん坊)	March 9, 2012
468	"Delay Candy"; Transliteration: "osodaame" (Japanese: おそだアメ)	March 9, 2012
-	"Doraemon: Nobita and the New Steel Troops—Winged Angels"	March 16, 2012
469	"Let's Live to Laugh"; Transliteration: "Wara tte kurasou" (Japanese: わらってくらそう)	March 23, 2012
470	"Nobita's Son Ran Away From Home"; Transliteration: "Nobita no musuko ga iede shita" (Japanese: のび太の息子が家出した)	March 23, 2012
471	"Let's Take a Bath in a Delicious Hot Spring!"; Transliteration: "Oishī onsen ni nyūrō!" (Japanese: おいしい温泉に入ろう！)	March 30, 2012
472	"The Make-Believe Treasure Hunter Set"; Transliteration: "Takara sagashigokkosetto" (Japanese: 宝さがしごっこセット)	March 30, 2012
473	"Doraemon's 100 Year Time Capsule"; Transliteration: "Doraemon no 100-nen taimukapuseru" (Japanese: ドラえもんの100年タイムカプセル)	April 27, 2012
474	"A Golden Week Sheltered From People"; Transliteration: "Hito yo ke gōruden'u~īku" (Japanese: 人よけゴールデンウィーク)	May 4, 2012
475	"The Apartment Tree"; Transliteration: "apāto no ki" (Japanese: アパートの木)	May 4, 2012
476	"The Fake Alien"; Transliteration: "Nise uchūbito" (Japanese: ニセ宇宙人)	May 11, 2012
477	"The Absconding Leaf"; Transliteration: "doronpa" (Japanese: ドロン葉)	May 11, 2012
478	"Let's Watch the Solar Eclipse"; Transliteration: "Nisshoku o miyou" (Japanese: 日食を見よう)	May 18, 2012
479	"Jaiko, the Comic Book Artist"; Transliteration: "manga-ka jai-ko sensei" (Japanese: まんが家ジャイ子先生)	May 18, 2012
480	"This Road, That Road, and the Easy Road"; Transliteration: "Anomichikonomichi rakuna michi" (Japanese: あの道この道楽な道)	May 25, 2012
481	"Shizuka-chan in My Pocket"; Transliteration: "poketto no naka no shizukachan" (Japanese: ポケットの中のしずかちゃん)	May 25, 2012
482	"Barging Into Jaiko's Comic Books"; Transliteration: "Jai-ko no manga ni o jama shima" (Japanese: ジャイ子の漫画にお邪魔しま)	June 1, 2012
483	"The Weather Box"; Transliteration: "otenkibokkusu" (Japanese: お天気ボックス)	June 1, 2012
484	"I'll Become a Singer By Eating Candy"; Transliteration: "Kyandī namete kashu ni narou" (Japanese: キャンディーなめて歌手になろう)	June 15, 2012
485	"The Revertion Light"; Transliteration: "modoriraito" (Japanese: もどりライト)	June 15, 2012
486	"The Chance Maker"; Transliteration: "Chansumēkā" (Japanese: チャンスメーカー)	June 22, 2012
487	"Let's Walk Our Way to Happiness!"; Transliteration: "shiawase wa aruiteikō!" (Japanese: しあわせは歩いていこう！)	June 22, 2012
488	Transliteration: "Sokkuri-yō kan" (Japanese: そっクリようかん)	June 29, 2012
489	"The Lost-Item Delivery Machine"; Transliteration: "wasuremonookuritodokeki" (Japanese: 忘れ物おくりとどけ機)	June 29, 2012
490	"A Buggy Hero Arrives!!"; Transliteration: "Sanjō! Mushimushihīrō! !" (Japanese: 参上！ムシムシヒーロー！！)	July 6, 2012
491	"The One Inch Boy"; Transliteration: "Issu n bōshi" (Japanese: いっすんぼうし)	July 6, 2012
492	"Entry to Nobita's Room is Forbidden"; Transliteration: "Nobita no heya wa shin'nyū kinshi" (Japanese: のび太の部屋は進入禁止)	July 13, 2012
493	"What a Relief! Gian Insurance"; Transliteration: "anshin! Jaian hoken" (Japanese: あんしん！ジャイアン保険)	July 13, 2012
494	"War! Gian vs The Monster Army"; Transliteration: "Kessen! Jaian vs obake gundan" (Japanese: 決戦！ジャイアンvsオバケ軍団)	July 27, 2012
495	"World Rock-ord"; Transliteration: "sekai-ki rokku" (Japanese: 世界記ロック)	July 27, 2012
496	Transliteration: "Shutsugeki! Sensuikan Nobita-gō" (Japanese: 出撃！潜水艦のび太号)	August 10, 2012
497	"Searching for a Fun Job"; Transliteration: "tanoshī oshigoto sagashi" (Japanese: 楽しいお仕事さがし)	August 10, 2012
498	"Can't Stop the Ghost Life"; Transliteration: "Yūrei kurashi wa yame rarenai" (Japanese: ユーレイ暮らしはやめられない)	August 17, 2012
499	"How to Get a Reply to a Letter You Haven't Sent"; Transliteration: "dasanai tegami no henji o morau hōhō" (Japanese: 出さない手紙の返事をもらう方法)	August 17, 2012
500	"Go To Her Quick, Flowing Noodles!"; Transliteration: "Hashire! Nagashisōmen" (Japanese: 走れ！流しそうめん)	August 24, 2012
501	"The ESPer with a 10-Minute Delay"; Transliteration: "10-bu okure no esupā" (Japanese: 10分おくれのエスパー)	August 24, 2012
502	"The Incident Bomb"; Transliteration: "Jiken bakudan" (Japanese: ジケン爆弾)	August 31, 2012
503	"The Big Adventure Gamebook"; Transliteration: "dai bōken gēmubukku" (Japanese: 大冒険ゲームブック)	August 31, 2012
504	"Thank God for the Prison Break"; Transliteration: "Arigatodesu kara no dai dassō" (Japanese: アリガトデスからの大脱走)	September 7, 2012
505	"Flying Fish"; Transliteration: "Sora to busa ka na" (Japanese: 空とぶさかな)	September 14, 2012
506	"Getting Favors with the Favoritism Fir"; Transliteration: "hī ki de hīki" (Japanese: ひい木でひいき)	September 14, 2012
507	"Werewolf Cream"; Transliteration: "O okami otoko kurīmu" (Japanese: おおかみ男クリーム)	October 19, 2012
508	"Time Switch for Humans"; Transliteration: "ningen-yō taimusuitchi" (Japanese: 人間用タイムスイッチ)	October 19, 2012
509	"Nobita Wins First Prize with a Cucumber?"; Transliteration: "Nobita ga kyūri de ichitōshō?" (Japanese: のび太がキュウリで一等賞？)	October 26, 2012
510	"The Continuation Spray"; Transliteration: "Tsudzuki supurē" (Japanese: つづきスプレー)	October 26, 2012
511	"Gian & Suneo, A Miraculous Duet!"; Transliteration: "Kiseki no de~yuetto! Jai& sune" (Japanese: 奇跡のデュエット！ジャイ & スネ)	November 2, 2012
512	"The Fearsome Happiness Cards"; Transliteration: "shiawase toranpu no kyōfu" (Japanese: しあわせトランプの恐怖)	November 2, 2012
513	"The Actor Clapperboard"; Transliteration: "Netsuen kachinko! !" (Japanese: 熱演カチンコ！！)	November 9, 2012
514	"The Sloth Suit"; Transliteration: "Namakemonosūtsu" (Japanese: ナマケモノスーツ)	November 9, 2012
515	"The Courtesy Candy"; Transliteration: "Shitsuke kyandī" (Japanese: しつけキャンディー)	November 16, 2012
516	"The Hamelin Pipe"; Transliteration: "hameruncharumera" (Japanese: ハメルンチャルメラ)	November 16, 2012
517	"Nobita, His Dad, and the Alcohol River"; Transliteration: "Papa to Nobita to sake no oyogu kawa" (Japanese: パパとのび太と酒の泳ぐ川)	November 23, 2012
518	"The Revenge Missiles Come Flying"; Transliteration: "shi kaeshi misairu ga tonde kita" (Japanese: しかえしミサイルが飛んできた)	November 23, 2012
519	"Shoes to Dance According to the Type of Music"; Transliteration: "Odora nya sonsonshūzu" (Japanese: 踊らにゃソンソンシューズ)	November 30, 2012
520	"The Doraemon the Raccoon Loved"; Transliteration: "Doraemon ni koi shita tanuki" (Japanese: ドラえもんに恋したタヌキ)	November 30, 2012
521	"The Horror of Gian's Pizza"; Transliteration: "Kyōfu no jaianpiza" (Japanese: 恐怖のジャイアンピザ)	December 7, 2012
522	"The Nobeatles are Born!"; Transliteration: "kessei! Nobi ̄ toruzu" (Japanese: 結成！のびーとるず)	December 7, 2012
524	"Lottery 300 Million Yen Jackpot!"; Transliteration: "Takarakuji 3 oku-en ōatari!" (Japanese: 宝くじ3億円大当たり！)	December 31, 2012
525	"The Unlucky Point Card"; Transliteration: "Anrakkīpointokādo" (Japanese: アンラッキーポイントカード)	December 31, 2012
526	"Dorami and the Story Badges"; Transliteration: "dorami to o hanashi bajji" (Japanese: ドラミとおはなしバッジ)	December 31, 2012
527	"I Found a Tsuchinoko!"; Transliteration: "tsuchinoko mitsuketa!" (Japanese: ツチノコ見つけた！)	December 31, 2012

== 2013 ==
No.	Title	Original release date
527	"The Human Piggy Bank"; Transliteration: "Ningen chokin-bako" (Japanese: 人間貯金箱)	January 11, 2013
528	"The Birth of Detective Nobita!"; Transliteration: "Tanjō! Mei tantei Nobita" (Japanese: 誕生！名探偵のび太)	January 11, 2013
529	"I Want to Eat Crab!"; Transliteration: "Kani tabetai!" (Japanese: カニ食べたい！)	January 18, 2013
530	"Shopping Across the Ages"; Transliteration: "Jidai o koete o kaimono" (Japanese: 時代を超えてお買い物)	January 18, 2013
531	"Ultra Ehoumaki"; Transliteration: "Urutora ehō-maki" (Japanese: ウルトラ恵方巻き)	January 25, 2013
532	"The Snow's Hot, Hot, Hot!"; Transliteration: "yuki de atchitchi" (Japanese: 雪でアッチッチ)	January 25, 2013
533	"Suneo's In Love"; Transliteration: "Suneotto ga hitomebore" (Japanese: スネ夫がひとめぼれ)	February 1, 2013
534	"Shizuka's Open-Air Space Bath"; Transliteration: "shizuka no uchū ro ten furo" (Japanese: しずかの宇宙ろてん風呂)	February 1, 2013
535	"Phantom Thief Nobita Calling On!"; Transliteration: "Kaitō Nobita sanjō!" (Japanese: 怪盗のび太参上！)	February 15, 2013
536	"Taking to the Skies with the Bird Cap"; Transliteration: "Bādokyappu de ōzora e" (Japanese: バードキャップで大空へ)	February 15, 2013
537	"Mom and Dad's Big Battle at Home"; Transliteration: "Papa mama o uchi de dai batoru" (Japanese: パパママおうちで大バトル)	February 22, 2013
538	"A Sure-Fire Win with the Palm-Reading Set?"; Transliteration: "kanarazu ataru? Tesō setto" (Japanese: かならず当たる？手相セット)	February 22, 2013
539	"The Absolute Strongest! The Knock-Down Hitman Z"; Transliteration: "Saikyō! Korobashi ya Z" (Japanese: 最強！ころばし屋Z)	March 1, 2013
-	"Doraemon: Nobita's New Great Adventure into the Underworld"	March 15, 2013
540	"The Explosion Pepper"; Transliteration: "Baku hatsu koshō" (Japanese: ばくはつコショウ)	April 12, 2013
541	"We're Gonna Go Flower Watching, No Matter What"; Transliteration: "naniganandemo o hanami o" (Japanese: 何が何でもお花見を)	April 12, 2013
542	"Striving to Go For a Holiday in Hawaii"; Transliteration: "Yari kuri shite Hawai ryokō" (Japanese: やりクリしてハワイ旅行)	April 26, 2013
543	"Shizuka-chan's Angel Raiment"; Transliteration: "shizukachan no wa-goro mo" (Japanese: しずかちゃんのはごろも)	April 26, 2013
544	"Taking a Nap in the Sky"; Transliteration: "Hiru ne wa tengoku de" (Japanese: ひるねは天国で)	May 3, 2013
545	"The Dictator Switch"; Transliteration: "dokusaisuitchi" (Japanese: どくさいスイッチ)	May 3, 2013
546	"Instant Mom"; Transliteration: "Insutanto mama" (Japanese: インスタントママ)	May 10, 2013
547	"Gian: Locked On!"; Transliteration: "nerawareta jaian" (Japanese: 狙われたジャイアン)	May 10, 2013
548	"Escape from the Horrifying Honekawa Mansion"; Transliteration: "Dasshutsu! Kyōfu no hone kawa hausu" (Japanese: 脱出！恐怖の骨川ハウス)	May 17, 2013
549	"The Understanding Helmet"; Transliteration: "satoriherumetto" (Japanese: さとりヘルメット)	May 17, 2013
550	"House 'Copter"; Transliteration: "Iekoputā" (Japanese: イエコプター)	May 24, 2013
551	"Shizuka-chan's Worst Birthday Ever"; Transliteration: "shizukachan no saiakuna tanjōbi" (Japanese: しずかちゃんの最悪な誕生日)	May 24, 2013
552	"Proximity to Cinnabar Stick"; Transliteration: "Shu ni majiware bō" (Japanese: 朱にまじわれ棒)	May 31, 2013
553	"Gian's a Panda"; Transliteration: "jaian ga panda" (Japanese: ジャイアンがパンダ)	May 31, 2013
554	"The Souvenir Cloth"; Transliteration: "Omiyagefuroshiki" (Japanese: おみやげフロシキ)	June 7, 2013
555	"He's the Strongest! Black Belt Nobita"; Transliteration: "saikyō! Kuro obi Nobita" (Japanese: 最強！黒おびのび太)	June 7, 2013
556	"Gian's Retirement Concert"; Transliteration: "Jaian no intai konsāto" (Japanese: ジャイアンの引退コンサート)	June 14, 2013
557	"The Dream Director's Chair"; Transliteration: "yumekantokuisu" (Japanese: ユメかんとくいす)	June 14, 2013
558	"The Opposite World Mirror"; Transliteration: "Abekobe sekai mirā" (Japanese: あべこべ世界ミラー)	June 21, 2013
559	"Nobita's Secret Tunnel"; Transliteration: "Nobita no himitsu ton" (Japanese: のび太の秘密トン)	June 21, 2013
560	"Moving with the Moving Map"; Transliteration: "Hikkoshichizu de o hikkoshi" (Japanese: ひっこし地図でおひっこし)	July 5, 2013
561	"Advertising in Mirrors"; Transliteration: "Kagami de komāsharu" (Japanese: かがみでコマーシャル)	July 5, 2013
562	"The Anything Popsicle Stick"; Transliteration: "Nan demo aisu bō" (Japanese: なんでもアイス棒)	July 12, 2013
563	"Determination Concrete"; Transliteration: "kesshin konkurīto" (Japanese: 決心コンクリート)	July 12, 2013
564	"Farewell to My Vacuum Cleaner"; Transliteration: "Sayonara boku no sōji-ki" (Japanese: さよならボクのそうじ機)	July 26, 2013
565	"Grand Voyage on a Midsummer's Evening"; Transliteration: "manatsu no yoru no dai kōkai" (Japanese: 真夏の夜の大航海)	July 26, 2013
566	"Favorite Drink"; Transliteration: "daisukindorinku" (Japanese: ダイスキンドリンク)	July 26, 2013
567	"Deep Sea Cycling"; Transliteration: "Shinkai saikuringu" (Japanese: 深海サイクリング)	August 9, 2013
568	"Nobita's Candid Camera"; Transliteration: "Nobita no dokkiribideo" (Japanese: のび太のドッキリビデオ)	August 9, 2013
569	"Let's Grow Some Fireworks!"; Transliteration: "Hanabi o sodateyou!" (Japanese: 花火を育てよう！)	August 16, 2013
570	"The Partitioning Hammer"; Transliteration: "Bunshin hanmā" (Japanese: 分身ハンマー)	August 16, 2013
571	"The Summer Vacation I Lived with Monsters"; Transliteration: "Obake to kurashita natsuyasumi" (Japanese: オバケと暮らした夏休み)	August 23, 2013
572	"The Hardening Light"; Transliteration: "kachinkachinraito" (Japanese: カチンカチンライト)	August 23, 2013
573	"Nobita's Big Summer Festival Plan!"; Transliteration: "Nobita no natsu matsuri dai sakusen!" (Japanese: のび太の夏祭り大作戦！)	August 30, 2013
574	"I Can't Study in the Sahara Desert"; Transliteration: "Saharasabaku de benkyō wa deki na" (Japanese: サハラ砂漠で勉強はできな)	August 30, 2013
575	"How to Use Nobita's Energy"; Transliteration: "Nobita enerugī no tsukaikata" (Japanese: のび太エネルギーの使い方)	September 6, 2013
576	"Floating Through the Sky with Nose Balloons"; Transliteration: "Hana barūn de ōzora ni" (Japanese: はなバルーンで大空に)	September 6, 2013
577	"The Giant Dora-Raccoon at Midnight"; Transliteration: "Mayonaka no kyodai dora tanuki" (Japanese: 真夜中の巨大ドラたぬき)	September 13, 2013
578	"The Human Locomotive"; Transliteration: "Nin gen kikan-sha" (Japanese: にんげん機関車)	October 18, 2013
579	"Mushroom Picking with a Mini Garden"; Transliteration: "hakoniwa de matsutake gari" (Japanese: 箱庭で松たけがり)	October 18, 2013
580	"What Kinda Day is Halloween?"; Transliteration: "Harō~in tte nan'nohi?" (Japanese: ハロウィンって何の日？)	October 25, 2013
581	"The Sampling Spoon"; Transliteration: "Ajimi supūn" (Japanese: 味見スプーン)	October 25, 2013
582	"Doing Anything I Please with the Magic Hand"; Transliteration: "Majikkuhando de yaritaihōdai" (Japanese: マジックハンドでやりたい放題)	November 1, 2013
583	"The Head of the Gorgon"; Transliteration: "gorugon'nokubi" (Japanese: ゴルゴンの首)	November 1, 2013
584	"A Roasted Sweet Potato's Feelings"; Transliteration: "Yakīmo no kimochi" (Japanese: ヤキイモの気持ち)	November 8, 2013
585	"Twinkle, Twinkle Little Comet"; Transliteration: "suisei ga gingiragin" (Japanese: すい星がギンギラギン)	November 8, 2013
586	"Nobita vs. Musashi: The Battle Shortly Before Ganryujima"; Transliteration: "Nobita vs Musashi Ganryūjima chotto mae no tatakai" (Japanese: のび太vs武蔵 巌流島ちょっと前の戦い)	November 15, 2013
587	"Doodling on Doraemon"; Transliteration: "Doraemon ni rakugaki" (Japanese: ドラえもんに落書き)	December 6, 2013
588	"Getting Fired Up! Dorami's Crash Course in Figure Skating"; Transliteration: "moeyo! Dorami no sukēto tokkun" (Japanese: 燃えよ！ドラミのスケート特訓)	December 6, 2013
589	"The Time Machine is Lost!!"; Transliteration: "taimu mashin ga nakunatta! !" (Japanese: タイムマシンがなくなった！！)	December 6, 2013
590	"The Fur Coat Ring"; Transliteration: "Kegawaringu" (Japanese: ケガワリング)	December 13, 2013
591	"The Great, Twinkling Christmas Plan"; Transliteration: "kirakira kurisumasu dai sakusen" (Japanese: きらきらクリスマス大作戦)	December 13, 2013
592	"The Resolution Door"; Transliteration: "Eikōnotobira" (Japanese: エイコーノトビラ)	December 30, 2013
593	"Flattery Jaws"; Transliteration: "odate jōzu" (Japanese: おだてジョーズ)	December 30, 2013
594	"Romance in the Snowy Mountain"; Transliteration: "yukiyama no romansu" (Japanese: 雪山のロマンス)	December 30, 2013

== 2014 ==
No.	Title	Original release date
595	"Good House, Bad House"; Transliteration: "Yoi ie warui ie" (Japanese: よい家わるい家)	January 17, 2014
596	"Phobia of ◯△□"; Transliteration: "◯△□ kyōfushō" (Japanese: ◯△□ 恐怖症)	January 17, 2014
597	"The Global Evacuation Plan"; Transliteration: "Chikyū dasshutsu keikaku" (Japanese: 地球脱出計画)	January 31, 2014
598	"The Word-Banning Marker"; Transliteration: "kotoba kin shi mākā" (Japanese: ことばきんしマーカー)	January 31, 2014
599	"Animal Transformation and Repayment Medicine"; Transliteration: "Dōbutsuhenshin'ongaeshigusuri" (Japanese: 動物変身恩返しグスリ)	February 7, 2014
600	"The Snowman Came to Town"; Transliteration: "yukidaruma ga machi ni yattekita" (Japanese: 雪だるまが町にやってきた)	February 7, 2014
601	"Help Yourself to a Chocolate Nobita"; Transliteration: "Choko Nobita o meshiagare" (Japanese: チョコのび太をめしあがれ)	February 14, 2014
602	"Recital on the Night of the Blue Moon"; Transliteration: "aoi tsukiyo no risaitaru" (Japanese: 青い月夜のリサイタル)	February 14, 2014
603	"Revolving Sushi of People I Wanna See"; Transliteration: "Aitai hito kaitensushi" (Japanese: 会いたいヒト回転寿司)	February 28, 2014
604	"Taking It Easy with the Copy Brain"; Transliteration: "kopī zunō de rakushiyō" (Japanese: コピー頭脳でラクしよう)	February 28, 2014
-	"Doraemon: Nobita's Secret Gadget Museum"	March 7, 2014
605	"The Good Luck/Bad Luck Duo"; Transliteration: "Fukubinkonbi" (Japanese: ふくびんコンビ)	March 14, 2014
606	"Walk, Walk, All the Way to the Moon"; Transliteration: "aruke aruke tsuki made mo" (Japanese: 歩け歩け月までも)	March 14, 2014
607	"The Horse Bamboo Farm"; Transliteration: "Umatake bokujō" (Japanese: ウマタケ牧場)	April 11, 2014
608	"The Overnight Cramming Pickling Barrel for Tests"; Transliteration: "tesuto ni ichiyadzuke daru" (Japanese: テストに一夜漬けダル)	April 11, 2014
609	"The Dolphin of the Vacant Lot"; Transliteration: "Akichi no iruka" (Japanese: 空き地のイルカ)	April 18, 2014
610	"Erasing "Nuisances" with the Time Pistol"; Transliteration: "taimupisutoru de" jama-mono" wa kese" (Japanese: タイムピストルで"じゃま物"は消せ)	April 18, 2014
611	"I'll Be the King of the Stone Age"; Transliteration: "Sekki jidai no ōsama ni" (Japanese: 石器時代の王さまに)	April 25, 2014
612	"Catch Those Carp Streamers!"; Transliteration: "koinobori o tsukamaero!" (Japanese: 鯉のぼりをつかまえろ！)	April 25, 2014
613	"Let's Make an Anywhere Door!"; Transliteration: "Dokodemodoa o tsukurou!" (Japanese: どこでもドアを作ろう！)	May 2, 2014
614	"Oh, Crane, Please Return the Favor!"; Transliteration: "Tsuru yo, on o kaeshite!" (Japanese: ツルよ、恩をかえして！)	May 2, 2014
615	"Nobita Railways"; Transliteration: "Nobita tetsudō" (Japanese: のび太鉄道)	May 16, 2014
616	"Changing a Handbag to a Hippo with the Object Conversion Gun?!"; Transliteration: "buttaihenkanjū de kaban o kaba ni! ?" (Japanese: 物体変換銃でカバンをカバに！？)	May 16, 2014
617	"W-What?! Nobita Got a 100?!"; Transliteration: "Na, nanto! ! Nobita ga 100-ten totta! !" (Japanese: な、なんと！！ のび太が100点とった！！)	May 23, 2014
618	"Treasure of Chinkara Peak"; Transliteration: "Chin kara-tōge no takaramono" (Japanese: 珍加羅峠の宝物)	May 23, 2014
619	"Nobita's 100 Point Test - A Major Incident After 25 Years"; Transliteration: "Nobita no 100-ten 25-nen-go no daijigen" (Japanese: のび太の100点25年後の大事件)	May 30, 2014
620	"The Deluxe Light"; Transliteration: "derakkusuraito" (Japanese: デラックスライト)	May 30, 2014
621	"Nobita's Fried Shrimp"; Transliteration: "Nobita no ebifurai" (Japanese: のび太のエビフライ)	June 6, 2014
622	"The "Help Me!" Lifeboat"; Transliteration: "tasukete! Tasukebune" (Japanese: たすけて！助け船)	June 6, 2014
623	"Takeshi's Bum-Ba-Dum Birthday!"; Transliteration: "Takeshi no zundoko tanjōbi" (Japanese: たけしのズンドコ誕生日)	June 13, 2014
624	"Dad's a Mama's Boy, Too"; Transliteration: "papamoamaenbo" (Japanese: パパもあまえんぼ)	June 13, 2014
625	"Nobita Eleven"; Transliteration: "Nobita irebun" (Japanese: のび太イレブン)	June 20, 2014
626	"The Stuff-for-Stuff Switcher"; Transliteration: "Butsubutsu kōkanki" (Japanese: ぶつぶつ交換機)	June 20, 2014
627	"Doraemon's Castle in the Back Hills"; Transliteration: "Urayama no Doraemon shiro" (Japanese: 裏山のドラえもん城)	June 27, 2014
628	"The "Truth Banner" is Always Correct"; Transliteration: "“shinjitsunohatajirushi” wa tsuneni tadashī" (Japanese: 「真実の旗印」はつねに正しい)	June 27, 2014
629	"This Fish Transformed into a Boat!"; Transliteration: "Sakana ga bōto ni dai henshin" (Japanese: さかながボートに大変身)	July 11, 2014
630	"The Indiscriminate Fad-Causing Virus"; Transliteration: "ryūkō-sei nekoshakushiuirusu" (Japanese: 流行性ネコシャクシウイルス)	July 11, 2014
631	"The Ghost Story Lamp"; Transliteration: "Kaidanranpu" (Japanese: 怪談ランプ)	August 1, 2014
632	"The Anything Airport"; Transliteration: "nandemokūkō" (Japanese: なんでも空港)	August 1, 2014
633	"Eight Days in the Palace of the Dragon King"; Transliteration: "Ryūgūjō no hachi-kakan" (Japanese: 竜宮城の八日間)	August 1, 2014
634	"The Stone Cap"; Transliteration: "Ishikoro bōshi" (Japanese: 石ころぼうし)	August 8, 2014
635	"Nobita's Bride"; Transliteration: "Nobita no o yome-san" (Japanese: のび太のおよめさん)	August 8, 2014
636	"Getting Through the Summer with a Mini House"; Transliteration: "Mini hausu de norikiru natsu" (Japanese: ミニハウスでのりきる夏)	August 29, 2014
637	"A Swim Ring That Makes You Happy"; Transliteration: "ukiuki suru Ukiwa" (Japanese: うきうきするウキワ)	August 29, 2014
638	"The Brief, Yet Epic Battle 100 Miles Underground"; Transliteration: "Chitei 100-mairu chotto no dai sakusen" (Japanese: 地底100マイルちょっとの大作戦)	September 5, 2014
639	"Shizuka-chan Becomes a Kappa?!"; Transliteration: "Shizukachan ga kappa ni! ?" (Japanese: しずかちゃんがカッパに!?)	September 12, 2014
640	"The Guidance Angel"; Transliteration: "Michibikienzeru" (Japanese: ミチビキエンゼル)	September 12, 2014
641	"Welcome to Nobita Airlines"; Transliteration: "Nobita kōkū e yōkoso" (Japanese: のび太航空へようこそ)	September 19, 2014
642	"Playing God"; Transliteration: "kamisama-gokko" (Japanese: 神さまごっこ)	September 19, 2014
643	"The Amazing 22nd Century Campsite"; Transliteration: "22 Seiki no sutekina kyanpu" (Japanese: 22世紀のすてきなキャンプ)	October 17, 2014
644	"Portable National Diet"; Transliteration: "pōtaburu kokkai" (Japanese: ポータブル国会)	October 17, 2014
645	"Anger Popcorn"; Transliteration: "Ikari no poppukōn" (Japanese: 怒りのポップコーン)	October 24, 2014
646	"Raccoon Maker"; Transliteration: "tanuki" (Japanese: タヌ機)	October 24, 2014
647	"The Rampaging Halloween Pumpkin"; Transliteration: "Harō~in no bōsō kabocha" (Japanese: ハロウィンの暴走カボチャ)	October 31, 2014
648	"My Ancestor, The Braggart"; Transliteration: "hora fuki gosenzo" (Japanese: ホラふき御先祖)	October 31, 2014
649	"Flying Comic Books"; Transliteration: "Sora tobu manga hon" (Japanese: 空とぶマンガ本)	November 7, 2014
650	"I'll Make Him Wear the Wet Clothes of False Accusations!"; Transliteration: "nure ginu o kiseyou!" (Japanese: ぬれぎぬを着せよう!)	November 7, 2014
651	"Muscular Body Clays"; Transliteration: "Mukimuki karada nendo" (Japanese: ムキムキ体ねんど)	November 14, 2014
652	"Finish Them Off with a Storm!"; Transliteration: "arashi de yattsukeyou!" (Japanese: 嵐でやっつけよう!)	November 14, 2014
653	"Fallen Leaves and Jaiko"; Transliteration: "Ochiba to jai-ko" (Japanese: 落ち葉とジャイ子)	November 21, 2014
654	"Nobita Becomes Shizuka-chan"; Transliteration: "shizuka ni natta Nobita" (Japanese: しずかになったのび太)	November 21, 2014
655	"Clone Kid Goku"; Transliteration: "Kurōnrikiddo Gokū" (Japanese: クローンリキッド悟空)	November 28, 2014
656	"A World Where You Don't Need Money"; Transliteration: "okanenoiranaisekai" (Japanese: お金のいらない世界)	November 28, 2014
657	"The Day Dorami Was Born"; Transliteration: "Dorami no umaretahi" (Japanese: ドラミの生まれた日)	December 5, 2014
658	"Recycling with Worker Ants"; Transliteration: "yarikuri ari de risaikuru" (Japanese: やりくりアリでリサイクル)	December 5, 2014
659	"Put on Some Flattery Lipstick"; Transliteration: "Osejikuchibeni" (Japanese: おせじ口べに)	December 12, 2014
660	"Headmaster Sign"; Transliteration: "iemotokanban" (Japanese: 家元かんばん)	December 12, 2014
661	"Sharing Gum"; Transliteration: "Osusowakegamu" (Japanese: おすそわけガム)	December 30, 2014
662	"A Space Fighter Attacks Nobita"; Transliteration: "uchū senkan Nobita o osou" (Japanese: 宇宙戦艦のび太を襲う)	December 30, 2014
663	"Remember! The Excitement of That Day"; Transliteration: "omoidase! Ano Ni~Tsu no kandō" (Japanese: 思い出せ！あの日の感動)	December 30, 2014

== Doraemon Mini Theater ==
Doraemon Mini Theater consists of short segments that aired in between segments of early episodes of the series.

EP#	English Title	Japanese Title	Manga source
2	Doraemon Mini Theater: The Farewell Handkerchief	ドラえもんミニシアター：さよならハンカチ	
3	Doraemon Mini Theater: The Never-Fall Rope	ドラえもんミニシアター：おちないつな	Pikkapika Comics Volume 1
5	Doraemon Mini Theater: The Anything Rope	ドラえもんミニシアター：なんでもロープ	
6	Doraemon Mini Theater: Let's Turn Flat and Play	ドラえもんミニシアター：ペタンコになって遊ぼう	
7	Doraemon Mini Theater: Riding a Ball	ドラえもんミニシアター：ボールに乗って	
8	Doraemon Mini Theater: Let's Grow Some Fireworks	ドラえもんミニシアター [????????????]	
9	Doraemon Mini Theater: The Magic Zipper	ドラえもんミニシアター：マジックチャック	
10	Doraemon Mini Theater: The Robot Pencil	ドラえもんミニシアター：ロボットえんぴつ	
11	Doraemon Mini Theater: Juice Set	ドラえもんミニシアター：シューズセット	
13	Doraemon Mini Theater:	ドラえもんミニシアター [????????????]	
15	Doraemon Mini Theater: The Anywhere Tap	ドラえもんミニシアター：まほうのじゃぐち	
