= The Falcon Pipiristi =

Komi folktale

The Falcon Pipiristi (Russian: Сокол Пипиристи, romanized: Sokol Pipiristi) is a folktale from the Komi people, first published in 1938 in the Russian language. In it, the heroine asks her father to bring an item that belongs to a falcon named Falcon Pipiristi, which she uses to summon him to her bedroom, but her sisters place hooks on the window to hurt him, causing him to fly away. The heroine then goes on a long journey to regain Pipiristi, finding him under the power of a witch, with whom she trades expensive gifts to spend a night in Pipiristi's room. Similar tales have been collected by folklorists from Komi sources.

The tale is classified in the international Aarne-Thompson-Uther Index as tale type ATU 432, "The Prince as Bird": a heroine is secretly visited by a prince in bird form, her family plots to hurt him, causing him to fly away, and the heroine goes after him.

== Source ==
According to Глеб Алексеев (Gleb Alekseev) and А. A. Попов (A. A. Popov), the tale was provided by an informant named P. G. Doronim, in 1934.

== Summary ==
In this tale, a man is ready to go to the market, and asks his daughters what presents he can bring them: the elder asks for some fabric for a summer dress, the middle one for a silken handkerchief, and the youngest for the net ("сеть", in the original) of Falcon Pipiristi. The man finds the articles for his elder daughters, but cannot find the net. The second time, the man goes to the market again and asks which gifts he can bring to his daughters, and they repeat their previous requests. Once again, the man finds the summer dress and the handkerchief, and still no sign of the net, to the cadette's great sadness. The third time, the man goes a third time to the market, and his daughters ask for the same things again. This time however, the man finds Falcon Pipiristi's net, an expensive and beautiful object. He brings the net to his youngest daughter, who takes the net with her and goes to her room.

Soon enough, Falcon Pipirist himself flies in through the girl's window, his body and feathers of a golden colour. They spend the night together. However, the girl's sisters learn of the clandestine meetings and place some fishing hooks on their cadette's window. The next time Pipiristi flies in, the hook injures his feathers and body. Feeling betrayed, the Falcon tells the girl go find him beyond "thrice-nine" lands, "thrice-nine" rivers, and "thrice-nine" green sands, then flies away. The girl cries for his departure, and decides to go after him. She takes a perfumed soap, a beautiful comb and a silken staff with her, and begins a journey through the distant lands. She reaches the beach and finds a swan flying overhead, to which she asks to carry her across the sea. Next, she reaches the green sands, where she finds a camel that she asks to help her ferry across the desert. Finally, the girl reaches a village, where she learns Pipiristi is living with a witch's daughter in a hut. She is advised to hire herself to the witch as a new maidservant.

One day, the girl is combing her hair with her comb, which the witch sees and wishes to have for herself. The girl trades the comb for a night in Pipiristi's chambers, and a deal is made, but the witch gives the human falcon a soporific wine. At night, the girl sings a song to a sleeping Pipiristi about how she crossed distances to reach him, but he does not nudge. The next morning, Pipiristi comments that he had a strange dream about his former lover, which the witch dismisses. For the next two nights, the girl trades the perfumed soap and the silken staff for two other nights with Pipirist: on the second night, the witch drugs Pipiristi again and the girl cannot wake him up.

For the third night, the human falcon avoids drinking the wine, and only pretends to be asleep; the girl, his true wife, enters his room and cries over him to wake up. Pipiristi opens his eyes and spends the night with the girl until the morning. The next morning, the witch knocks on Pipiristi door, but the couple pretend to he asleep. In a fit of fury, the witch gathers the elderly, gives them wine and asks them which marriage is strong, the first or the second, and the elderly answer that it is the first one. She dismisses them, summons the middle-aged people, gives them wine and asks them which crown is stronger, the first or the second, to which they answer the first one. Still not obtaining the answer she wants, she gathers the young, who also answer that the first crown is stronger. Thus, Pipiristi ties the witch to a horse, lets the animal loose and the witch's body bursts in pieces. Pipiristi then lives with his first wife.

== Analysis ==
=== Tale type ===
In their commentaries to the Komi tale, Глеб Алексеев (Gleb Alekseev) and А. A. Попов (A. A. Popov) stated that "it was difficult" to find a parallel to the Komi "Pipiristi Falcon" tales among the Russians. However, Russian scholar Nikolai P. Andreev criticized this position and noted that the Komi tale had indeed a Russian parallel: "Финист ясный сокол" ("Finist Bright Falcon"). In the same article, Andreev, who developed the first East Slavic Folktale Classification in 1929, classified the tale, numbered 44 in the Komi publication, as East Slavic tale type 432, "Финист ясный сокол".

In the Russian tale type SUS 432, "Финист ясный сокол" ("Finist Bright Falcon"), the prince comes to the heroine's room in bird shape; her jealous relatives (stepmother or sisters) place blades in the window to hurt the bird prince, and he flies away. The heroine then goes after him to cure him. The East Slavic tale type corresponds, in the international Aarne-Thompson-Uther Index, to type ATU 432, "The Prince as Bird".

=== Motifs ===
According to the Syrjänisches Wörterbuch ("Zyrian Dictionary"), by linguist Dávid Rafael Fokos-Fuchs, the falcon-prince's name is alternatively registered as pipiristi, pipiriski, and pipilisti. Fokos-Fuchs also mentioned that, in the Vychegda dialect of Zyrian, a pipiristi se̯ke̯l appears in a fairy tale as a shining garment or jewel, while in a tale sourced from Syktyvkar it is a se̯ke̯l 'falcon', and the name of the heroine's lover who married a second spouse in a second narration from Syktyvkar. Fokos-Fuchs interpreted Pipirist Sekel's name as "Flaming Falcon" or "Fire Falcon".

== Variants ==
Overall, at least five variants of type SUS 432 are reported from Komi sources.

=== Falcon Pipiristi 1 ===
Komi scholarship published two Komi tales translated to Russian with the title "Сокол Пипиристи" ("Falcon Pipiristi"). The first tale was collected from a source named A. A. Цембер, in 1912. In this tale, a man has a wife and three daughters, and asks his daughters which presents he can bring them from the market: the elder asks for an English sarafan, the middle one for a blue sarafan, and the youngest for Falcon Pipiristi. The man goes to the market and finds the elders' gifts, for he cannot find this falcon. The next time when he goes to the market, the man is asked to bring the elder daughter a "garus" sarafan, the middle daughter a gray sarafan, and the same falcon to the cadette. The man brings the sarafans, but cannot find the falcon. Thus, the youngest daughter takes some cookies with her and goes to meet a wise old woman and asks her where she herself can find Pipiristi. The old woman advises her to go to a certain green meadow and catch Pipiristi, then throw the cookies to distract her pursuers. It happens thus, the girl brings the Falcon Pipiristi with, which she wears and goes to church in splendid clothes, amazing the attendees. During the mass, she leaves church and goes back home, where the hides the clothes behind the oven, then goes to welcome her family, who has come back from church. The family mention the woman at the church, whom the girl feigns ignorance about. The next day, the girl goes again to church with the Pipiristi clothes, and again leaves it in the middle of the sermon. One of her sisters chases after her and sees the strange woman entering their house. The third day, the girl prepares to go to church in the Pipirist clothes, and finds the clothes have disappeared from behind the stove. She then goes to meet the same wise old woman, who warns her that she caught the falcon the first time, and may not have the same luck the second time. Still, the girl goes to the same meadow with some cookies, captures Pipiristi and rushes back, throwing some food behind herself to deter whoever it is that is chasing after her. However, she runs out of food, and her pursuers retrieve the bird, leaving her alone. The girl loses Pipiristi and lives in sadness. However, the same tale was collected by linguist Dávid Fokos during fieldwork in 1911, with the Komi title pipiristi sekel, from informant Andrej Andrejevies Czember, who heard the tale in Ust-Sysolsk.

=== The Falcon Pipilysty ===
Finnish linguist Yrjö Wichmann collected during the period 1901-1902, in Kortkeros, a tale from the Syryenen (Komi people) with the title pipili̯sti̯ sḙkḙl, which he translated to German as Der falke Pipilysty ("The Falcon Pipilysty"). In this tale, a rich merchant asks his three daughters what they want as gifts. The elder two ask for shoes and a headscarf, while the youngest asks for the Falcon Pipilysty. The merchant does not find the bird in the first two journeys, but on the third be brings home the Falcon Pipilysty. While her sisters go to church, the bird becomes a human youth and he gives her beautiful clothes to go to church. One day, the girl burns Falcon Pipilysty's birdskin, and he disappears beyond the mountains. She has to go after him, and brings with her a spool of golden thread, yarns of silk and a golden frame. She reaches a meadow where a hut is located, and finds her husband there, living in the hut with a joma. The girl uses the three objects to bribe the joma for three nights with her husband. On the first two nights, she tries to wake him up by recounting her arduous journey so far, but he does not flinch. On the third night, the husband awakes and escapes with the girl.

=== Princess Martha (Wichmann) ===
Wichmann collected in Usťsysoľsk another Komi tale titled marpida tsarevna, which he translated to German with the title Prinzess Martha ("Princess Martha"). In this tale, a couple have a daughter named Princess Martha. One day, the girl asks her mother for new clothes, but her tells her mockingly to stay on the stove and pluck the hazel grouse there. Martha cries. Some time later, after her family goes to church, Martha goes down to the basement and finds the Falcon Pipilys down there. The falcon dresses her in a nice yellow dress for her to attend church; she walks over rivers and fields and enters church, then returns home before mass ends. Her mother comes home and comments to her daughter the beautiful girl that was at church, people asking if she was God or a man. The next day, Martha asks her mother for some floorboard matting, and her mother makes the same mocking remark. Again, Martha goes to the basement to meet Pipilys, who dresses her in pearls to attend church. Martha goes to church in the second outfit, then returns home. Her mother comes back home and comments about the girl at church. Martha reveals she was the girl at church, and her clothes have been given by Pipilys. On saying this, Pipilys leaves another outtife on the stairs and flies away. Martha goes after him and passes by the hut of a joma in search for him. The first joma does not know anything, so Martha continues journeying. She passes by the huts of two other jomas, and the third joma says Pipilys passes through there, but flew over the sea, so the third joma gives Martha three pairs of shoes and three eggs. The joma advises her to put on the shoes after she crosses a fiery meadow, the third pair after she crosses a meadow of burning coals; she will then reach a seashore, where a raven can ferry her across the sea. Martha follows the joma's instructions and reaches the seashore. She spots the raven and offers the dress in exchange for ferrying her across the sea. It happens thus and Martha, on the other side of the sea, walks a bit more and reaches yet another hut, also belonging to an old Joma. She asks there is Pipilys is nearby, and the man himself jumps from the stove to confront Martha. Martha asks him why he fled, and Pipilys questions her the reason for revealing who provided her the dresses. Martha then bids him go with her, but the old Joma asks them to stay. She offers them a bitter drink ("branntwein", in Wichmann's translation), Martha and Pipilys drink, and the tale ends.

=== Marpida the Princess (Plesovsky) ===
Komi folklorist Fëdor Plesovsky collected a Komi tale with the title "Марпида-царевна" ("Marpida, the Princess"). In this tale, an old man finds a girl in the woods who says she is Marpida, bride to Falcon Pipilis, left for dead by her stepmother. The old man takes the girl in and adopts her, but the old man's wife also mistreats her. One day, Marpida asks her foster mother for a sundress, but the woman mockingly tells her to sit on the stove and, with the grouse, weave a sundress. Later, Pipilis flies to her side as a falcon, turns into a man, and wishes to take her to his kingdom, but she declines. At any rate, he promises to fulfill her requests, as long as she never tells the old woman about him. Time passes, and the old woman goes to church. Marpida summons Pipilis for a dress; he comes, gives her a dress and takes her to church. Her foster mother returns home and tells Marpida about the stranger at church with the fine clothes. The next time, Marpida goes with a sundress embroidered with beads, then returns home, and tells her foster mother she was the stranger at church, revealing about the bird Pipilis. Her foster mother decides to catch the bird and have the dresses for herself, but, the next day, Pipilis gets word of this, leaves a scarf to Marpida, and flies away. Marpida learns of this and decides to search for him. She passes by the small hut of a Yoma-baba, who did not see him, then to another Yoma-baba, who directs her to a third hut under a pine tree. The girl reaches the third hut, where another Yoma-baba lives, who does know where Pipilis went: beyond the blue sea. Thus, she gives Marpida three eggs (the first of copper, the second of silver, and the third of gold), and three pairs of boots ('köti'), for her to traverse a meadow of fire, then a meadow of hot coals, until she reaches the seashore. Marpida rolls the copper egg on the ground and follows it, traversing the fiery meadow and the hot coals with the boots, until she reaches the seashore. She summons a raven to carry her across the sea, then pays it with the silver egg. Finally, she rolls the golden egg on the ground and follows it, until she finds Pipilis in a distant hut. They meet again, and Pipilis says her stepmother died, so he can be taken back to her castle, but Marpida declines, choosing to stay with Pipilis in the bird kingdom.

=== Pipiristťi Falcon ===
Hungarian Finno-Ugricist Károly Rédei collected a dialectal Komi tale from Vychegda with the title pipirisťi sokol ("Pipiristťi falcon"). In this tale, a couple lives with their three daughters. When their mother is ready to go to the market, the elder sisters ask for dresses, while the youngest for the tivk-tavk of pipirisťi. Their mother brings them the presents. Curious about their cadette's gift, the elder two spy on her: pipirisťi falcon flies in through the cellar window. The sisters place pins on the window and, the next time pipirisťi falcon arrives, his body is prickled by the pins. Feeling betrayed, he tells the girl to search for him in a place beyond three times nine lands, three times nine waters, and three times nine seas. The girl cries for her missing falcon, and goes after him. She reaches the house of a witch, who tells the girl pipirisťi falcon has married a witch's young daughter, who comes to visit her from time to time. The girl then takes out a golden comb to comb her hair and uses it to bribe the witch's daughter for a night with pipirisťi. She tries to talk to him in tears, but he is fast asleep due to have been given too much vodka to drink. The next time, the girl takes out a spool of thread which she trades for a second night, and lastly, on the third day, a golden broom. Pipirisťi notices he has been having dreams about his former wife for the past two nights, and is being given enough vodka to pass out, so he avoids drinking any more of what the witch's daughter gives him. On the third night, Pipirisťi pretends to fall asleep and the girl goes to talk to him. He wakes up and embraces her, but the girl fears for the witch's daughter's fury. In order to solve their problem, Pipirisťi ties his second wife to a colt and lets it loose, quartering the witch's daughter into limbs that spread everywhere. At the end of the tale, the witch herself goes to pay a visit to her son-in-law, but does not know her daughter is dead and picks up the arms, legs and eyes off the road that belong to her daughter. After she arrives, Pipirisťi also ties her to a colt to destroy the witch.

=== Pipiriski Falcon ===
In a dialectal Komi tale titled "ПИПИРИСКИ-СӦҚЭЛ", translated to Russian with the title "Пипириски-Сокол" ("Pipiriski Falcon"), a king and queen have three daughters. One day, a merchant named Pipiriski Falcon comes to sell his goods, which the monarchs buy for his three daughters. The youngest princess, named Marfida, however, says she only needs a dress made of silk "muslin". Some time later, the youngest princess puts on her mother's old dress and stays home, while her family goes to church. Howevert, as soo as they leave, the girl meets Pipiriski Falcon, for they knew each other, puts on a silk muslin dress and goes to church. She amazes the attendees, but flees back home as soon as the church bells begint to ring in the vespers. Marfida rushes back home, takes off the splendid dress and stays put for her family's return. The sisters comment about the newcomer at church. The next day, the same thing happens. The elder sisters begin to suspect the newcomer may have something to do with Marfida. The next time family goes to church, the elder princesses hide under the stairs and spy on their sister Marfida going to meet Pipiriski and gaining the dress. Marfida goes to church and notices her sisters' absence, then goes back home. The elder princesses report the finding to the king, who banishes Marfida to the banya. Still, the princess keeps meeting Pipiriski. One day, he declares that they shall be married on a certain day.

== See also ==
- The Blue Bird
- The Canary Prince
- The Three Sisters
- The Green Knight
- Prince Sobur
- The Fan of Patience
- The Greenish Bird
