= The Green One in Glass =

Sudanese folktale

The Green One in Glass (Akhdar Azaz fi Gazaz; German: Achdar Azaz Im Glass; English: "Achdar Azaz in the Glass") is a Sudanese folktale. In it, the heroine asks her father to bring an item that belongs to a prince of supernatural origin, which she uses to summon him to her bedroom, but her sisters place broken glass to hurt him, causing him to fly away. The heroine then goes on a long journey to find her supernatural lover, and cures him. Similar tales have been collected by folklorists from oral tradition in Sudan.

It is classified in the Aarne-Thompson-Uther Index as type ATU 432, "The Prince as Bird": despite lacking the prince in bird form, the narrative adheres to the type's description.

== Source ==
According to Andreas Kronenberg and Samia Al Azharia Jahn, the tale was collected by 'Abdallah aṭ-Taijib from the Berber area. Sudanese author Abdullah El Tayib later translated the tale and sourced it from Northern Sudan.

== Summary ==
In this tale, Fatima is a beautiful girl that lives with her father and stepfamily. Whenever her father goes on trips, her stepsisters always asks for gifts, while she does not and wishes for his safe return. One day, her stepsisters, suspecting their father dotes on Fatima, talk to her about asking him to bring "Achdar Azaz in the Glass", which she does not know anything about. Still, the next time her father goes on a journey, the girl asks her father to bring Achdar Azaz in the Glass ("The Green One in Glass"). The man goes on a journey and cannot find Achdar Azaz, until he meets an old woman by a tree and tells her he is looking for this item. The old woman explains that Achdar Azaz is an Emir, son of seven man-eating mothers named Silah (ghouls); if he wants to meet him, he has to avoid them. Fatima's father goes to meet Achdar Azaz and tells him about going to meet his beautiful daughter Fatima, which he cannot do, but gives the man a package and summons a magic horse named Dervish to take the man home. It happens thus and the man teleports home. He gives a servant the package, with orders to be delivered to Fatima. The servant, curious, opens the package and finds a mirror which reflects Achdar Azaz from the other side. The Emir summons Fatima's father again and asks him about the person in the mirror, which the man says is a servant, not his daughter. Achdar Azaz goes with the man to meet Fatima and marvels with her beauty. The pair spend time together and he gives her a golden necklace before leaving.

One day, Fatima's stepsister, who always makes her bed, finds the necklace and shows it to her mother, and the women steal the golden presents whenever she makes the bed. Achdar Azaz tells Fatima about the gifts he leaves and asks her to make her bed herself, thus she keeps his gifts. Her stepfamily begins to plan to ruin her happiness and suggests she asks the prince how he can be hurt. Achdar Azaz explains that his seven mothers are Silah, but he is not supernatural, and they can all be hurt by shards of glass in their bed. The next time Achdar Azaz lies on the bed, his body is badly hurt by the glass and, believing Fatima did this to hurt him, vows to kill her and returns to his mothers. Meanwhile, Fatima dons male garments and flees from home, while also looking for her lover around the world. At one time, she stops to rest by a tree and overhears the conversation between two birds (sparrows, in El-Tayib's translation) which talk about Achdar Azaz's injuries and the way to cure him: the livers of both birds. Fatima stones the birds to death and takes their livers, then keeps walking until she meets the same old woman her father met. The old woman warns her about the seven man-eating Silah mothers, and their son's situation: it was prophesied that Achdar Azaz was to be hurt by glass, and only the livers of the magical birds of the djinn, Abu Najir and Abu Najira (Abinayir and Abinayara, in El-Tayib's translation) can cure him, but these birds are only released from their cages once every hundred years. Fatima, disguised as a fakir, says she has the cure, then goes to meet the seven Silah, who want the fakir to cure their son, unless he is devoured. Fatima applies the lotion she produced from the birds' livers on Achdar Azaz's body and heals his injuries. In return, she makes the Silahs promise not to devour any more people, and asks for Achdar Azaz's amulet and sword as payment, and makes him promise not to hurt the person who shouts "in the name of the Fakir that cured him".

Fatima then teleports back home and places his amulet and sword on the wall. Achdar Azaz appears to kill her, but sees his belongings on the wall, and asks if the fakir was there. Fatima then shouts to be spared "in the name of the fakir that cured him", and still Achdar Azaz does not realize anything. Fatima reveals the whole story, and the Emir summons his horse to turn his step-relatives-in-law to dust. Fatima's father appears and accepts the fate of his wife and stepdaughter, but is happy for his own daughter.

== Analysis ==
=== Tale type ===
The tale is classified in the international Aarne-Thompson-Uther Index as type ATU 432, "The Prince as Bird": the heroine asks her father to bring a strangely-named object that leads her to the enchanted prince, whom she meets in secret; her sisters find out about the clandestine meetings and place blades or glass to hurt the prince, causing him to disappear; the heroine dons a disguise and goes after him; she overhears the conversation between two birds about the cure, which she uses on the prince.

== Variants ==
According to researcher Emmanuel Plantade and scholar Hasan M. El-Shamy, tale type ATU 432 is also attested in tales from North Africa, in Egypt, Sudan, Algeria and Morocco.

=== Green-Beans ===
In a Sudanese tale collected by Ahmed Al-Shahi and F. C. T. Moore with the title Green-Beans, from El-Barsa, a man is married to two wives, the first named Hadariya. He has one daughter by the first wife, named Nayya ('beautiful'), and three daughters by the second. After his first wife dies, Nayya's sister goad her into asking her father for "Green-Beans", the name of the son of seven mothers and seven fathers, and guarded by ants, slaves and lions. Not wanting to disappoint Nayya, and advised by an old woman, the man passes through Green-Beans's defenses and meets the youth. The man explains the situation to Green-Beans, who presents him with three suitcases, the last one with a firka (a striped red thawb). The man gets the third suitcase with the firka with a letter inside, and gives it to his daughter. Nayya reads the letter, which states that Green-Beans would rather have a female slave. The girl then asks the same old woman to be sold as a slave in Green-Beans's home country, which she does. After Nayya is bought by Green-Beans as a slave, she writes him a letter and flees back home. Later, everything is cleared up, and Nayya marries Green-Beans, but her jealous half-sisters, envying her happiness, convince her to ask their brother-in-law how the men in their country can be killed. Despite his reservations, he still answers her question: they have first to kill a seven-headed serpent, grind its flesh and winnow it in a mat. Nayya's half-sisters follow Green-Beans's instructions and place the resulting powder on his mat; the youth becomes sick and has to be taken back home. Meanwhile, Nayya begins a quest of her own and meets an old man that she kills with a pin on his head. She takes his old man's skin and wears it, then stops by a tree, where she overhears two birds talking about the cure for Green-Beans's ailment: their livers and wings. Nayya kills the birds and pounds their organs. In the old man's disguise, she goes to Green-Beans's castle and cures him, demanding in payment his sword and a whip. Nayya returns home and places his objects on a wall, so that, when Green-Beans appears, he sees them and realizes his wife cured him. As the tale continues, Nayya goes with her half-sisters to the desert, and the latter take out the former's eyes and abandon her there, until she is found by a beggar. With Nayya's sewing skills, she weaves enough carpets for the beggar to buy her eyes back. At the end of the tale, Green-Beans visits the beggar, finds his wife, and after learning of his sisters-in-law's misdeeds, kills them.

=== Hassan the physician ===
In another Sudanese tale, Hassan the physician, a merchant has three daughters. One day, he has to go on a journey, and asks what presents he can bring them: the elder asks for a mirror that can see into the whole world; the middle one for a pestle and mortar whose clanging is heard from East to West, but the youngest does not know what to ask for. That same night, in her dream, an old woman appears to her and tells her to request "him of the curly hair, from the land of happenings rare". After journeying, the merchant finds the mirror and the pestle and mortar, but not the strange request. When he tries to leave on boat, a storm rages out, blocking his path. The sailors know discover the merchant is responsible for this, and drop him on an island. The merchant survives and is greeted by the islanders, who, after being told of his daughter's request, explain their prince is "him of the curly hair". The merchant meets the prince and explains the story to him, and the prince, in return, agrees to meet his daughter, but she has to prepare him a fountain with orange-flower water and wait for the night. The merchant goes home and tells his youngest daughter to do as the prince asked. The girl does and the prince comes to her by the fountain. They spend time together. One night, however, the elder sisters drop powdered glass in the fountain for his next return; he appears by the fountain, gets hurt in the glass, and rushes back home. When the prince does not appear in the following nights, the girl decides to journey in search for him, and stops to rest by a fig tree. She then overhears two doves talking about a cure for the prince: take their hearts and livers, roast and smash them into a paste. The girl kills the doves, prepares the remedy and travels to the prince's kingdom to cure him. Once she reaches the kingdom, she passes herself off as a male "Hassan, the physician", and heals him. After he is cured, the prince has a meal of asseda bi-asal with "Hassan", confiding in him about his lover whom he wishes to punish for trying to kill him. The girl returns home and discovers her elder sisters injured the prince, then waits by the fountain. After the prince appears to her, she explains the whole story to him.

== See also ==
- The Blue Bird
- The Three Sisters
- Prince Sobur
- The Fan of Patience
