= The Enchanted Snake =

Italian fairy tale

The Enchanted Snake or The Snake (Neapolitan: Lo serpe) is an Italian fairy tale written by author Giambattista Basile in the Pentamerone, as the fifth story of the second day. The tale is related to the international cycle of the Animal as Bridegroom or The Search for the Lost Husband, wherein a human maiden marries a prince cursed to be an animal, loses him and has to search for him.

It is Aarne-Thompson type 425A, "The (Animal) Monster as Bridegroom". Others of this type include The Black Bull of Norroway, The Brown Bear of Norway, The Daughter of the Skies, The Enchanted Pig, The Tale of the Hoodie, Master Semolina, The Sprig of Rosemary, East of the Sun and West of the Moon, and White-Bear-King-Valemon. The second part of the tale, wherein the heroine finds the cure for her lover's ailment and cures him, ties it to tale type ATU 432, "The Prince as Bird".

== Translations ==
The tale has been variously translated as The Enchanted Snake, by author Andrew Lang for The Green Fairy Book, as The Serpent Prince, by illustrator Edmund Dulac, also as The Serpent Prince for a 1849 publication, as Grannonia and the Fox, and by Nancy Canepa as The Serpent.

The story was also republished as Der verzauberte Königssohn, translated as The Prince Who Was Betwitched, as part of the Brothers Grimm collection. In this version, the heroine is called Grauhilda.

== Synopsis ==
A poor woman named Sapatella longed for a child. One day, she saw a little snake in the forest and remarked that even snakes have offspring; the little snake offered to be her child. The woman and her husband, called Cola Mattheo, raised the snake. When it grew up, it wanted to marry, and not to another snake but to the king's daughter. The father went to ask, and the king said that the snake should have her if he could turn all the fruit in the orchard into gold. The snake told his father to gather up all the pits he could find and sow them in the orchard; when they sprang up, all the fruits were gold.

The king then demanded that the walls and paths of his palace be turned to precious stones; the snake had his father gather up broken crockery and throw it at the walls and paths, which transformed them, making them glitter with the many coloured gems.

The king then demanded that the castle be turned to gold; the snake had his father rub the walls with a herb, which transformed them.

The king told his daughter, Grannonia, he had tried to put off this suitor but failed. Grannonia said that she would obey him. The snake came in a car of gold, drawn by elephants; everyone else ran off in fright, but Grannonia stood her ground. The snake took her into a room, where he shed his skin and became a handsome young man. The king, fearing that his daughter was being eaten, looked through the keyhole, and seeing this, grabbed the skin and burned it. The youth exclaimed that the king was a fool, turned into a dove, and flew off.

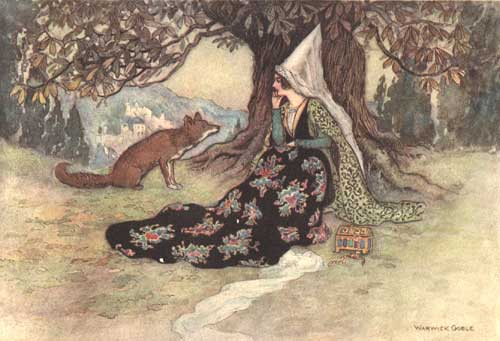
Princess Grannonia meets the helpful fox. Illustration from Stories from the Pentamerone (1911, Macmillan).

Grannonia set out in search of him. She met a fox and traveled with him. In the morning as the princess remarked on the wondrous sounds of the birdsongs, the fox told her the birdsong would be even better if she knew what the birds were saying: that a prince had been cursed to take a snake's form for seven years, that near the end of the time, he had fallen in love with and married a princess, but that his snake skin had been burned, and he had struck his head while he fled, and was now in the care of doctors. The fox then told her that the blood of the birds would cure him, and he caught them for her. Then he told her that his blood was also needed; she persuaded him to go with her and killed him.

She went to her husband's father and promised to cure the prince if he would marry her; the king agreed and she cured him. The prince refused because he had already pledged himself to another woman. The princess, pleased, revealed that she was that woman and they married.

== Analysis ==
=== Tale type ===
The tale is classified in the international Aarne-Thompson-Uther Index as types ATU 425A, "The Animal (Monster) as Bridegroom", ATU 432, "The Prince as Bird", and ATU 433, "The Prince as Serpent". The second revision of the index, made in 1961 by scholar Stith Thompson, referred to the tale as "Pentamerone II, No. 5" and listed it under the general type AaTh 433, "The Prince as Serpent". French scholars Paul Delarue and Marie-Louise Thèneze recognize the tale as a combination of types: AT 433A (subtype of type ATU 433) and ATU 432. Renato Aprile, editor of the Italian Catalogue of Tales of Magic, classifies the tale under type 432.

=== Motifs ===
The urging of her father to marry the beast because he had promised her represents a factor clearly present in arranged marriages. This tale has been interpreted as symbolically representing an arranged marriage; the bride's revulsion to marrying a stranger being symbolized by his bestial form.

The episode of the heroine overhearing the animals that talk about how to cure the ailed prince occurs in tale type ATU 432, "The Prince as Bird".

==== The animal husband ====
According to Letterio di Francia, in many Italian variants the prince is either transformed into a serpent or is an enchanted pig. In turn, according to Greek folklorist Georgios A. Megas's quantitative analysis, among the many forms of the enchanted husband in Italian variants, he appears as a serpent in 11 tales and as a pig in 10 texts.

== See also ==
- The Blue Bird
- The Canary Prince
- The Green Knight
- The Snake Prince
- The Three Sisters
- Prince Sobur
