= The Fan of Patience =

Pakistani fairy tale

The Fan of Patience (Urdu: Sabr ka pankha) is a Pakistani fairy tale from Punjab, published by Pakistani author Shafi Aqeel and translated into English by writer Ahmad Bashir.

It tells the story of a princess who summons into her room a prince named Sobur (Arabic: "Patience"), or variations thereof, by the use of a magical fan. The story contains similarities to the European (French) fairy tale The Blue Bird - both tales classified, according to the international Aarne-Thompson-Uther Index, as tale type ATU 432, "The Prince as Bird".

== Summary ==
A king has six daughters and no son. When his wife, the queen, announces she is pregnant, the king declares he will kill the baby if it is another daughter. As labour approaches, the queen is anxious, and the king orders the midwife to kill the child as soon as she is born. When the time comes, the midwife cannot kill her, and admires the beautiful child, who laughs and flowers fall from her lips. The queen is astonished at the princess's ability and bribes the midwife to lie to the king, so the princess can be raised in secrecy. As the princess grows up, the queen learns that her daughter can produce bricks of silver and gold with every step she takes, and keeps them stored.

One day, when a famine strikes the kingdom and the royal treasury is wholly depleted, the queen brings some of the bricks to her husband to keep the kingdom afloat. The king demands an explanation, and the queen makes him promise to let her live. The king agrees and they bring in his seventh daughter, bricks of gold and silver appearing with every step and flowers falling from her lips. The king makes peace with the queen and the princess, forgiving his previous order, and enjoys his youngest's company, since she saved the kingdom. However, the six elder sisters begin to envy her, so the king builds her a separate palace. One day, he has to go on a journey, and asks his daughters what he can bring them when he returns. After hearing his elder daughters' wishes, he goes to ask his seventh daughter in her palace, and her maid goes to ask her on the king's behalf. As the princess is saying her prayers, she asks her maid to have "patience", which she misconstrues as a material object named "patience".

When he returns from his journey, he brings his seventh daughter a box he says it is "patience". The girl does not understand the meaning of the gift and leaves it alone in a corner. Some time later, on a hot day, the girl decides to open the box to use the lid as a fan, and finds a beautiful fan inside. She waves it and a handsome prince appears before her. She swoons at the sight, but the prince wakes her up and explains the fan can summon him and send him back. The princess spends her days with the prince, and rumours of their meetings reach her elder sisters' ears, who become even more jealous of her. Thus, they feign friendship and decide to learn about the mysterious prince, and even prepare a bed for him, where they place glass. The princess, believing their words, summons the prince. Just as he lies on the bed, the glass hurts his body and he bleeds all over, so the princess waves the fan to send him back to his country.

Days pass, and the prince does not return, even as the princess waves the fan. She then decides to search for him in his home country, wears masculine clothes and ventures into jungles until she can find him. On one occasion, she stops to rest by a tree and overhears the conversation between a mynah bird and a parrot about the prince and how to heal his wounds: take droppings from both birds, make them it a powder and apply to his wounds. She produces the remedy and takes it with her to the prince's country in the West, where she introduces herself as a physician who has come to dress the prince's wounds.

== Analysis ==
=== Tale type ===
The tale is classified in the international Aarne-Thompson-Uther Index as type 432, "The Prince as Bird", albeit in a form that exists in South Asia. In these variants, the heroine's father brings her a fan, which she uses to summon the magical prince whose name translates to 'Wait' or the like.

=== Motifs ===
The tales contain motif J1805.2.1, "Daughter says 'Sobur' ('Wait'); Father thinks it is a thing, finds Prince Sobur". The motif appears in tale type ATU 432, "The Prince as Bird".

The tales also contain motif D1425.3., "Magic fan summons prince for heroine".

In some tales, the heroine passes by a King Lear-type judgement (Motif H592), indexed as its own tale type in the catalogue for Indic tales: AT 923B, "The Princess Who Was Responsible for Her Own Fortune".

== Variants ==
=== Prince Sabr ===
Sindhologist Nabi Bakhsh Baloch published a Sindhi tale collected from a source in Hyderabad, Pakistan, with the Sindhi title: "صبر شهزادو" ("Sabr Shahzada"), translated to English as Prince Sabr. In this tale, a king has three beautiful daughters, but the third and youngest the most beautiful and intelligent of them all. The king likes to ask his daughters how much they love him, and they reply with sweet metaphors. One day, however, the youngest compares her love for him as salt to a meal. Enraged, the king thinks the third princess offended him and orders some attendants to abandon her in the wilderness. The princess complies with his orders, but utters he will regret his decision. She goes to the forest and meets with a beggar man. They live together. One night, she has a dream of someone pointing to a spot in the forest where she is to dig. She relates her dream to her friend, the beggar, who suggests this is a good omen, so they look for the spot to dig up. They do so and find a chest with diamonds and precious gems. The princess suggests the beggar take some of the gems to the marketplace to hire some carpenters to build them a house, and they should keep some of the gems to themselves. The carpenters build them a fine palace, and they live comfortably. The princess and the beggar take the rest of the chests from the hole, also filled with gems and jewels, save for a seventh box that contains a beautifully ornate fan with gold and pearl. The princess takes the fan for herself and, one day, waves it and a prince appears to her. The princess is surprised at his presence, but the man introduces himself as a prince from Fairy-land who the fan summoned to her. The princess spends time with the fairy prince, and waves the fan to both summon and send him back. One day, the princess bids the beggar man invites her father and sisters for a meal at her palace, and asks him not to reveal anything about her, for she will wear a disguise. It happens thus, and the king and the six princesses attend the meal, where they are served a tasteless meal without salt. The king finally understands what his cadette meant, and the princess reveals herself. Father and daughter reconcile. As for the elder princesses, they feel insulted by the deception, and decide to investigate how she obtained so much money. One night, they spy on the princess summoning Prince Sabr, and decide to hurt him by placing broken glass on a bed, since fairy people have "delicate skin" that bleeds easily. Soon enough, the elder princesses pretend to be tired and convince Sabr to rest a while. The prince lies down in bed, and the glass hurts his skin. Badly injured, he begs the princess, his lover, to come find him, then vanishes. Time passes, the princess mourns for her lover's disappearance, and decides to search for him. She stops to rest by a tree, and overhears two birds talking about how the leaves from that same tree can cure the prince. The princess plucks some leaves and, six months later, reaches her lover's kingdom. She meets some girls fetching water for Prince Sabr, and introduces herself as a doctor that can cure Sabr. She uses the remedy on him, and reveals herself to him. They reconcile and live happily.

=== The Patient Princess ===
In a tale from Pakistan with the title The Patient Princess, a king thinks he holds the destinies of his family and subjects in his hands. One day, he summons his daughters to ask them about who is responsible for their fates, hoping the girls reinforce his beliefs. The six elders agree with him, while the youngest, named Princess Sabira, declares that every one is responsible for their own kismat. Infuriated, the king orders his Chief Kotwal to banish her to a hut in the forest. Some time later, the king has to go on a journey, and sends a messenger to his youngest's hut to ask what presents he can bring her. Inside the hut, Sabira is busy with her prayers, and tells the messenger "Sabar" ('patience'). The messenger reports back to the king that his daughter uttered the word "Sabar", which they think is the name of the object she wants to be procured. The king goes abroad and meets a person named Prince Sabar, who gives him a chest with a fan inside. The king brings back the present and gives his daughter. Sabira opens the chest, takes the fan and washes it, waving it to dry. Suddenly, a man appears in her bedchambers, summoned by the fan. He introduces himself as prince Sabar. Sabira waves the fan left and right, and the youth disappears and reappears, confirming his story. They fall in love with each other, and Sabar promises to build Sabira a sumptuous palace. Some time later, Sabar makes good on his promise and her palace is built. However, the king and his daughters notice its construction where Sabira lived, and refuses to approach it, but his daughters insist to be allowed to visit their sister. Reluctantly, the king agrees, and the six princesses visit Sabira's new palace, marvelling at its splendour. They also meet Prince Sabar. After they leave, Sabar confides in Sabira that he does not trust his sisters-in-law, but Sabira chooses to believe in them. As it turns out, Sabar's worries are confirmed, for the six princesses begin to feel jealousy toward Sabira and conspire to kill Sabar, so that his palace may disappear with him. The next time they visit Sabira, they place a mixture of glass and poison under Sabar's bedsheet. On the same day, he returns from the hunt and goes to sleep a bit, when the trap springs and his body is hurt by the glass shards. Sabira returns from her evening prayers and finds Sabar injured all over. In response, he says her sisters did this to him, and bids she waves the fan to send him back to his kingdom. After some time, she waves the fan in hopes of him appearing again, to no avail. Thus, she decides to look for his kingdom, and travels far and wide to search for him. Without luck, she stops before a stream and rests under a tree, when she begins to overhear a pair of birds talking about prince Sabar's illness: the hen-bird says the birds' droppings can be collected and made into a thin paste to heal him, and the male bird says the bark from the tree can be used to carve sandals to allow one to cross the dangerous stream. After the birds fly away, Sabira follows their instructions, prepares the remedy for Sabar and the sandals, and crosses the river until she reaches a city. Once there, she dons a turban and introduces herself as a Hakim with the cure for the prince. Sabira, as the Hakim, is brought to the prince's presence and applies the paste on him, mixed with water. Prince Sabar is healed, and the Hakim asks in return for his ring, his handkerchief and a sash. Princess Sabira returns home and waves the fan to summon her beloved. Sabar appears, now fully restored, and complains that he did warn her about her sisters, but is fortunate enough to have been cured by the Hakim. The princess then asks where is the ring and his sash, which he says he forget somewhere. Sabira produces the objects and puts on the Hakim disguise, proving she was the one that cured him. Sabar takes his lover to his father and they celebrate an official wedding.

=== Patience ===
In a tale collected from a Pakistani American source, published as Patience, a king has seven daughters. One day, he has to go on a journey, and asks the princesses what they want as gifts. After inquiring his six elder daughters, he goes to ask his youngest, the girl is busy making her morning prayers and asks her father for "patience". The king misunderstands the words as being her request and departs on his journey. After he arrives at the foreign land and resolves his business, he goes looking for presents for his daughters, but cannot find the "patience" for his youngest daughter. He asks around, but does not have any luck, until he finds a little store in a corner of the bazaar. An old shopkeeper appears to the king, claiming to have the "patience", and shows him a tin cylinder with a paper fan inside. Despite some reservations, the king is convinced to take the cylinder to his daughter. He goes back home and gives the cylinder to the seventh princess. The princess explains she meant for her father to have "patience", for she was busy at the time, but accepts the gift regardless. She takes the paper fan out of the cylinder, and the object jumps out of her hand, turning into a human male. The man explains he is the prince of Iran, turned into a fan by a jealous witch, and now the princess broke his curse. The princess and the prince agree to a marriage.

== See also ==
- The Blue Bird (fairy tale)
- The Canary Prince
- The Three Sisters (fairy tale)
- The Green Knight (fairy tale)
- The Feather of Finist the Falcon
- Prince Sobur
