= Yonec =

Narrative lay by Marie de France

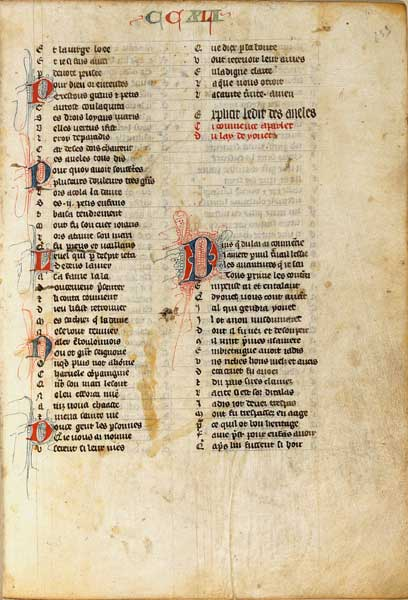
An image of the Yonec text

"Yonec" is one of the Lais of Marie de France, written in the twelfth century by the French poet known only as Marie de France. Yonec is a Breton lai, a type of narrative poem. The poem is written in the Anglo-Norman dialect of Old French in rhyming couplets of eight syllables each. This lai tells the story of a woman who seeks to escape a loveless marriage, and of the child born from the love that she found elsewhere.

== Plot summary ==
The lord of Caerwent, a rich old man, marries a beautiful young woman. He fears that she will be unfaithful to him, so he imprisons her in a tower and assigns his aged sister to watch over her. As the years go by, she laments her situation and stops taking care of herself, making her beauty fade away. One day, she cries out to God, wishing that she could experience a romantic adventure as she has heard in fairy tales. Suddenly, a dark bird resembling a goshawk appears at her window. The bird transforms into a handsome knight named Muldumarec. Muldumarec declares his love for her and reveals that, while he has loved her from afar, he could only approach her once she had called for him. The woman refuses his advances unless he can prove that he was not sent by the devil to lead her astray. Muldumarec says that he is a Christian, and as proof of such, he assumes the woman's shape and receives the Eucharist.

When the rich lord is away, the knight arrives by the window, in the same way he first appeared. The woman glows with her newfound love. The other people of the household become suspicious of her renewed beauty and put her under discreet surveillance. When the jealous husband learns of the shapechanging knight, he surrounds the window with iron spikes. The next time the knight arrives, he is mortally wounded. He tells the woman that their unborn child, whom she is to name "Yonec", will grow up to avenge their deaths. The knight flies away, and the woman hurls herself from the window and follows a trail of blood to a city made of silver. After passing through a succession of rooms, she eventually finds the knight on his deathbed. He gives her a magic ring that will make her husband forget about her infidelity. He also gives her his sword. As the woman flees the city, she hears the bells tolling for her lover's death.

As prophesied, the lady gives birth to a child, and names him "Yonec". When the child is grown, the husband, the lady, and Yonec travel to an abbey, where they see a beautiful tomb. They ask the abbot about the tomb, who explains that this is the tomb of Muldumarec. At this time, Yonec's mother tells him of his true parentage, and gives him his father's sword. She collapses and dies. Yonec kills his stepfather with the sword, thus avenging his real parents. He buries his mother alongside his father, and Yonec becomes the new lord of Caerwent.

== Analysis ==
=== Motifs ===
The motif of a lover visiting in the form of a bird draws upon a common folklore motif, as in Child ballad 270, The Earl of Mar's Daughter. It also features in the Italian fairy tale The Canary Prince.

Yonec has been compared to the lai of Tydorel because both include noblewoman who is visited and impregnated by a supernatural fairy-knight who then names the child.

=== Interpretations ===
The folklorist Alexander Haggerty Krappe (1894-1947) discusses the Yonec lai in his book Balor With the Evil Eye: Studies in Celtic and French Literature (1927). Krappe believes it comes from a very ancient myth, perhaps, he suggests, going back to fertility rites at the time of the introduction of agriculture, of a woman (the earth) shut away by an old man (the old year), impregnated by another man, whose child (the new year), then kills the old man. Other versions of this myth: Gilgamesh, Osiris, Balder, Danaë, Balor in Ireland, the "May Count" in Sweden, and "it has even penetrated to Uganda, where it is told of a local chief."

Krappe concludes, "The lay of Yonec is but a Christian and courtly version of the Irish myth of Balor in the form in which it was still current in Ireland at the time of the Norman conquest. But it was adapted to the civilisation of Mediaeval France and England and at the same time contaminated with the Märchen of the Jealous Stepmother."

== See also ==
- Anglo-Norman literature
- Medieval literature
- Medieval French literature
- The Bird Lover

== Bibliography ==
- Marie de France (1901). "Yonec". Marie de France: seven of her lays done into English. Translated by Edith Rickert. D. Nutt. pp. 65–84.
- Eugene Mason, ed. (1924). "XIII. The Lai of Yonec". French Mediaeval Romances. London and Toronto: J. M. Dent. pp. 125–136.
- Marie de France (1964). "Yonec". In Norma Lorre Goodrich (ed.). The Ways of Love: Eleven Romances from Medieval France. London: George Allen and Unwin Ltd. pp. 87–97.
- Marie de France (2013). "VII. Yonec". The Lays of Marie de France. Translated by David R. Slavitt. Athabasca University Press. pp. 77–88. ISBN 9781927356364.

Adaptations

- Reeves, James; Marie de France (1977). "The Shadow of the Hawk". The shadow of the hawk, and other stories by Marie de France. New York: Seabury Press. pp. 1–48.
