= The Earl of Mar's Daughter =

Traditional song

"The Earl of Mar's Daughter" (Roud 3879, Child 270) is an English-language folk song.

== Synopsis ==
The Earl of Mar's daughter saw a lovely bird, and promised it a golden cage if it would come to her. It did, and that night transformed into a prince in her bedroom. His mother had transformed him to that form. They lived together; she bore seven sons, but the prince carried them safe to his mother. A wooer came for the daughter, and she said she did not want to marry but to live with her bird. Her father swore to wring its neck, and the prince fled. He got his mother to transform many of his men, his sons, and himself to larger birds, and they attacked the wedding party and bore away the bride.

== Variants ==
Joseph Jacobs included a prose rendering of it, as Earl Mar's Daughter, in his English Fairy Tales. The ballad contains many fairy tale elements.

The lover visiting in the form of a bird is a common motif in folklore called The Bird Lover.

== Uses ==
In his The Merry Adventures of Robin Hood, Howard Pyle has Alan-a-Dale sing a variant of this song, May Ellen's Wedding.

== See also ==
- "The Brown Bear of Norway"
