= Prince Sobur =

Indian fairy tale

"The Story of Prince Sobur" is an Indian fairy tale. It tells the story of a princess who summons into her room a prince named Sobur (Arabic: صَبْر, romanized: ṣabr, lit. 'Patience'), or variations thereof, by the use of a magical fan. Spurred by envy, the princess's sisters hurt the prince with glass shards, causing him heavy injuries; the princess then goes after him to cure him.

The story contains similarities to the European (French) fairy tale The Blue Bird, and variants have been collected from South Asia (India and Pakistan) and in Eastern Africa.

== Summary ==
In a version of the story collected from by Lal Behari Dey from Bengal with the title The Story of Prince Sobur, the story begins with a question of the father, a merchant, to his seven daughters: "By whose fortune do they get their living?" The youngest answers that her living is by her own fortune. Her father expels her from home and she has to live in the jungle. After a while, the seventh daughter becomes rich and shares her wealth with her father. The merchant has to travel abroad, but his ship does not move. He then remembers he forgot to ask his seventh daughter what to bring her. He does and she says: "Sobur" ("wait"). He takes it to mean a thing named Sobur, and goes on his journey. In the foreign country, whose prince is called Sobur, the prince gives the merchant a box with a magical fan and a looking glass, telling him the box contains the "Sobur". The merchant returns and gives his daughter the box. She opens it a few days later and fans herself with the fan. By doing so, Prince Sobur teleports into her room. They fall in love and agree to marry. On the wedding day, her sisters prepare the nuptial bed with glass powder from broken bottles. When Sobur lies down in bed, he is gravelly injured and is rushed back to his native country. His wife decides to return with him, by donning the disguise of a Sannyasi. On her wanderings, she rests by a tree where a pair of birds, Bihangama and Bihangami, have their nest. She protects their nest by killing a snake and they, in gratitude, reveal how she can cure her prince. The birds agree to take her there faster than by going on foot. At the end of the tale, she cures Prince Sobur and he forgives his sisters-in-law.

== Variants ==
=== India ===
According to scholar A. K. Ramanujan, tale type ATU 432, "The Prince as Bird", is reported in "over 8 Indian variants", including Bengali, Hindi and Kannada. Kannada scholarship states the tale is "very popular" ("ಸಾಕಷ್ಟು ಪ್ರಚಲಿತವಾಗಿದ್ದು", in the original) in Karnataka, but follows a local development of the international tale type ATU 432, "The Prince as Bird". Scholar L.R. Heggade suggested that the story must have spread by Muslims.

==== The Fan Prince ====
Author Maive Stokes collected an Indian tale with the title The Fan Prince. In this tale, a king questions his seven daughters: Who gives them food? The six elders answer that it is him; the youngest that it is God. The seventh daughter is expelled from home and has to fend for herself in the jungle. After an adventure, they reconcile. One day, he has to travel abroad and asks his daughters what presents they want: the six elders for silk dresses and jewels, and the youngest simply said "Sabr" ("wait"). Her father takes notice of the strange declaration, but promises to look for this "Sabr". He buys the material wishes for his daughters in the foreign country, but still hasn't found "Sabr". Curiously, the men at the bazar say their king's son is called Sabr. The first king visits Prince Sabr, explains the story and receives from the prince a box that is to be given to the seventh princess. The king returns home and gives the box to his daughter. After a month she opens it: inside a fan, which she uses and suddenly Prince Sabr himself appears before her. They agree to marry each other, and her father consents. On their wedding day, the princess's six other sisters, angry at their sister's luck, prepare the bed for the prince with glass powder to hurt him. It so happens and Sabr is badly hurt. He urges his wife to use the fan the wrong way to teleport him back to his kingdom, where he may improve his condition. She dreams he is still in pain and decides to do something about it: she disguises as a male yogi and goes to another jungle, where she hears the a parrot and a "mainá" conversing about the cure to the prince. The princess, as yogi, gives the cure to her husband and reveals she was the yogi.

==== Prince Sabar ====
In a variant collected in Western India by Putlibaï Wadia, Prince Sabar, the tale begins with the father, a Sultan, asking their seven daughters what they want him to bring from his journey. The youngest answers "Sabar" ("patience"). The father asks around for the thing named Sabar, and an old woman tells him about a stone named "Sabar stone" which is in her yard since before she was born. He buys the stone from the woman and gives to his daughter. The daughter cries about it at first, but resigns herself and polishes the stone every day. She notices that the stone is wearing away and inside a fan is hidden. She waves the fan and a prince named Sabar appears to her. One day, Sabar warns the princess against a possible ploy by the sisters. She pays no heed to it, and the sisters prepare his bed with glass powder. He is hurt by the glass and begs the princess to use the fan to teleport him back to his parents. The tale was translated into French by Loys Bruyere, and retold by Indian scholar A. K. Ramanujan, who sourced it from Gujarat.

==== The Power of Fate ====
In a tale from Simla titled The Power of Fate, a Rajah asks his six adult daughters about their fates, and the sixth answers her fate is in no one's hands. The rajah expels her from home and orders some dooly-bearers to take her to the jungle and leave her there. The princess's dooly is tied to a large oak tree, and she begins to pray to Mahadeo. The deity listens to her prayers and sends an emissary to give her food and water. After a few days, Mahadeo, impressed with her piety, decides to reward her: the princess notices a hole in the ground, digs up and finds a silver and gold stones. She then meets a woodsman and pays him to build her a new house for her. With the remaining treasure, she hires servants to build a new palace. Later, father and daughter reconcile and the rajah has to travel somewhere, but first asks his daughters what presents he can give them. The sixth daughter asks for a little box that he may find in his travels. This box is kept by a bunniah and hides a fan that contains the soul of a prince. The rajah buys the box and gives his daughter, who opens it and finds a fan inside. She waves the fan and the prince appears to her. They spend hours together. One day, she foolishly reveals the secret to her sisters, who conspire to hurt the prince: they put glass powder on a couch. The next time the prince comes to the princess's room, he lays on the couch to rest, and the bits of glass hurt him. He returns to his kingdom, and the princess decides to dress as a fakir to go on a pilgrimage. One day, she rests by a tree and hears an eagle and a parrot conversing about the prince's situation and a way to cure him: mix the refuse of an eagle's nest with water and apply to the wounds. She follows the birds' instructions, cures the prince and reveals herself as his princess. The tale was also translated into Russian by Russian orientalist Sergey Oldenburg with the title "Чему быть, то и будет" ("What will be, will be").

==== Kupti and Imani ====
Andrew Lang published in his Olive Fairy Book a tale furnished by Major Campbell, originally collected from Punjab. In this tale, titled Kupti and Imani, a king has two daughters, Kupti and Imani, and asks them about leaving their futures in his hands. Kupti agrees to her father' s sentiment, but Imani argues that she will make her own fortune. The king takes his daughter to be a crippled fakir's companion, and leaves her there. The fakir and the exiled princess fall into a routine: she takes care of the fakir and weaves clothes for him to sell in the market. With the money, she hires builders to build a beautiful house for them. The king finally concedes that his daughter Imani was right after all. One day, he has to go on a journey to the country of Dûr, but asks his daughters what they want. The king's messenger goes to asks Imani, but, since she is busy tending other matters, she says: "Patience". The messenger relays the information to her father, the king. In Dûr, the king asks about the "patience", but finds none. The news reach the ears of the king of Dûr, named Subbar Khan ("Subbar" meaning "patience"). Subbar Khan gives the king a casket that can only be open by Imani. The king takes the casket to his daughter and she opens it: inside, a fan. She waves the fan three times and king Subbar Khan appears before her. He explains that the fan is magical and can both summon him if waved, and send him back by folding it and tapping three times. Subbar Khan continues to visit Imani and the fakir, and Kupti, her sister, becomes interested in knowing more of him. On the occasion of a visit to Imani, Kupti sprinkles on his bed powdered and splintered glass laced with poison. Subbar Khan is badly hurt by the glass and poison and returns to his kingdom by the magic fan. Imani and the fakir notice his long absence, and she decides to go to Dûr to see him. On her way, she stops by a tree and hears two monkeys talking about the cure: berries from that very same tree. Imani takes he berries and goes to Dûr just in time to heal the prince.

==== The Princess who got the gift of patience ====
In another tale, collected in Mirzapur from an old Muhammadan cookwoman with the title The Princess who got the gift of patience, a king with seven daughters asks them who they have confidence in. The six elders answer: in him. The youngest: in herself. The king banishes the youngest to the jungle. She finds a house in the jungle and lives there. One day, the king has to travel to another country and asks his daughters what they want as gifts. A servant goes to the youngest's house in the jungle to asks her the same question. The princess is bathing and tells the servant to have patience (sabar), for she is occupied. The servant relays the message to her father. Thus, the king asks around the marketplace in the foreign country for this "patience". An old woman says she has something wrapped in an dirty rag that she sells to the king. He brings it home to his daughter and gifts her. She is disappointed in the present, but years later she unwraps the dirty rag and finds a fan inside. She waves the fan and a prince appears before her. They fall in love. One day, her sisters pay her a surprise visit and, seeing the prince, conspire to hurt him. They take their glass bangles, grind them into powder and sprinkle it over the prince bed. The prince is badly injured and begs the princess to wave the fan to return him to his home. The princess dress up as a man and goes to the prince's palace. One night, she listens to the conversation between a parrot and a mainá on the events that transpired.

==== Sabar Karo ====
In a tale collected by Sunity Devi, Maharani of Coochbehar, with the title Sabar Karo, a king summons his three daughters to asks them a question. The elders answer that they love their father and are awarded with portions of the kingdom. However, the youngest answers truthfully, as her mother taught her: she may love her father now, but once she marries she will love her husband more. The king feels insulted and banishes her to the jungle. She has to fend for herself: though she was abandoned in the forest with a palki of food, she shares her food with the animals and the peacocks give her their feathers. She has an idea to make fans of the feathers and sell them. With the money, she hires workers to build her a palace. Some time later, her father, the king, unknowingly visits her kingdom and asks a servant if he can see her. The princess tells the maiden "Sabar karo" ("just wait"). Not knowing what it means, the servant leaves the palace, goes to another city and asks around for "Sabar karo". A shopkeeper sells her a golden box and she brings it back to her mistress. The princess opens the box and sees jewels, a looking-glass and at last a peacock feather fan. She uses the fan and a man appears before her. He introduces himself as a Maharajah. They set a date for their marriage and her family visits her. Her father, the king, and her mother, the Maharani, tell her that her elder sisters neglect them. Meanwhile, the two sister wander around the palace and, spurred by jealousy, try to ruin her happiness. On the nuptial night, the Maharajah lies on the bed and suddenly falls ill. He disappears. She uses the fan for months and he does not return, so she decides to seek him. She dresses in a plain sari and goes on a journey. One day, she stops by a tree and kills a snake that threatened a nest of little birds. The birds give her a herb she can use to cure the prince.

==== Aapkarmi ke Baapkarmi ====
Author Parita Mukta summarized another Indian tale titled Aapkarmi ke Baapkarmi. In this tale, a king summons his daughters and asks them a question: are they aapkarmi or baapkarmi, that is, if their fortunes are determined by their father, or by themselves? One of the princesses, his beloved daughter (ladli) answers 'aapkarmi', and is expelled from the palace. The princess begins to live just outside her father's domains. One day, the king has to go on a journey, and sends an emissary to his daughter's, Aapkarmi, new house to ask her what she may want. Aapkarmi, the girl, is busy to greet the emissary and replies from a distance: 'Saboor' ('patience'). The emissary thinks it is an object and informs the king, who travels abroad and finds the Saboor: an old woman gives him a stone with the same name. Princess Aapkarmi receives the stone, which cracks open to reveal a fan that summons a prince named Saboor. Aapkarmi and Saboor live in relative happiness, until the prince is poisoned by her jealous sisters and has to return home. Princess Aapkarmi disguises as a vaid and goes after him. On her quest, she finds him a remedy: excrement from a talking bird, mixed with her tears. After healing prince Saboor, they marry.

==== Her Fate's Rewards ====
In an Indian tale in the Magahi language collected by Ramprasad Singh with the title "अप्पन किस्मत के कमाई" ("Her Fate's Rewards"), a king gathers his seven daughters and asks them from where they derive their fortunes: the elders six answer they rely on their father, while the youngest says she relies on herself. For this, the king banishes her to the forest with a maid, but the queen ties a red thread to her daughter's wrist. In the forest, princess and maid ask a man atop a tree to throw down some fruits for the duo. The princess then sends the maid to sell the fruit in the city for a needle, thread and some flowers. With this, the princess begins to embroider and sell her handiwork in the market. One day, she hires some works to build her a house, but they cannot place the foundations. The princess goes to check and finds golden bricks, which she sells with the maid's help. In time, she accrues much wealth to hire a royal mason to build her a palace in the forest. Some time later, the king goes on a pilgrimage and asks his six daughters what gifts he can bring them; he also asks his cadette, who requests a "Harun Fan" ("हारुनी पंखा", in the original). The king buys gifts for his elder six, but cannot find the fan. The king is directed to the local monarch, who delivers the fan to the king. The king returns home with the Harun Fan and gifts his daughter through her maid. On one hot day, the princess asks her maid to find her a fan, and she brings her the Harun Fan. The princess waves herself with the fan and suddenly king Harun Rasheed appears to her, asking why she brought him there by the use of the fan. The princess turns the fan and confirms his story. Gradually, they fall in love. Later, the six princesses learn of their cadette's luck and begin to envy her. During a visit, they ask her to summon Harun, which she does reluctantly, and the princesses prepare a bed for him with powdered glass. He lies on the bed, the glass hurts him and he asks the princess to send him back with the fan. While Harun Rasheed agonizes in his kingdom, the princess tries to summon him back, to no avail. One day, she takes her maid with her in search of Harun, and stops to rest under a tree. She then listens to the conversation between two swans about Harun's injuries and the cure: for him to bathe in a certain river. The princess takes some water from the river, dresses as a beggar and reaches Harun's kingdom. She cures the prince and asks for payment a handkerchief, his ring, and a pandan. She returns home and summons Harun with a fan. With sword in hand, he accuses the princess of trying to kill him, but she says she cured him and shows him the ring, the handkerchief and the pandan. They reconcile, and she invites her father to her wedding with Harun. After the ceremony, the princess questions her father about her luck, and the king falls silent.

==== The Badshah and His Youngest Daughter ====
In a tale published by author Nalin Verma and collected from Bihar with the title The Badshah and His Youngest Daughter, a Badshah summons his seven daughters to ask them whom they credit for their fortune and happiness. The elder six answer that their fortune is due to their father's fortune, while the youngest, princess Yashmin, replies that her fortune lies in her own hands. Enraged, the Badshah banishes his cadette with an adjoining maidservant to fend for herself in the forest. As a parting gift, Yashmin's mother hides a precious stone in her daughter's hair. In the forest, both girls build a makeshift house with palm leaves and bathe in the river. Yashmin, who excels at weaving and sewing handkerchiefs and pillow covers, gives her mother's stone to her maidservant so it can be sold for money to buy materials for her craft. After earning much money, the princess hires some workers to build her a mud house. However, when the workers dig up the foundations, princess Yashmin finds a gold brick, which she sells in the market for more money. With the new funds, she hires carpenters to build a mansion larger than her father's. Some time later, her father, the Badshah, has to go on a pilgrimage and asks his six daughters which gifts he can bring them, then asks Yashmin's maidservant about her gift. The princess relays the message to her maidservant that she wants a haruni pankha, a type of fan, for her to fan herself in the hot weather of the forest. The Badshah finds the gifts for his six elder daughters, save for the haruni pankha. The monarch then learns the local king, Harun Rashid, has the fan. King Harun Rashid hesitates to part with the fan, but agrees to give it to the Badshah, who returns home and delivers the haruni pankha to Yashmin's maidservant, who places it inside the princess's palace through a window. Some time later, Yashmin finds the haruni pankha and waves it to fan herself, and suddenly king Harun Rashid appears in her quarters. In time, princess Yashmin beckons the king with the magical fan and both fall in love. At last, Harun Rashid and princess Yashmin marry, and Yashmin retorts to her father to whom she should attribute her luck, in reference to the Badshah's previous question.

==== Four Daughters ====
In a Kannada tale collected in North Karnataka with the title "ನಾಲ್ಕುಮಂದಿ ಹೆಣ್ಣುಮಕ್ಕಳು" ("Four Daughters"), a king has four daughters, three of them he finds suitors for them to marry save for the youngest, who he moves out to another house. One day, the king has to go the market at Kalaburagi ("ಕಲಬುರ್ಗಿ", in the original), and asks what presents he can bring them. The elder three ask for a gombi, a cradle and sweets for the elder three, and the youngest simply says "Sabaru" ('patience'). The king buys presents for his elder three, but cannot find this "Sabaru" the youngest asked for, until he finds a man working on a wooden cradle ("ತೊಟ್ಟಿಲು", in the original) that the man says is Sabaru's cradle. The king brings back the gifts and delivers the cradle to the youngest princess, who places it in water and suddenly a youth appears to her. They spend time together and fall in love. One day, the elder princesses decide to visit their cadette, and see her with fine dishes. They return four days later and ask their sister to fetch something for them to eat, and, while she is in the kitchen, they spread some khusāḷimuḷḷu ("ಖುಸಾಳಿಮುಳ್ಳು", in the original) over the mattress and cover it, eat a meal and leave. Later, the princess summons the youth by placing the cradle in water, the youth comes and lies on the mattress. He cries in pain and begs the princess to send him back. The princess notices the khusāḷimuḷḷu on the mattress and has a realization. As for the youth, he feels his body is on fire due to the thorns on his body. Back to the princess, she dons a beggar disguise and goes in search of him. She stops to rest by a tree and overhears the conversation between a male and female eagles ("Garuda", in the original): if the princess fetches their excrements ("ಹೇಲು", in the original), boil them and apply to the youth's skin, he will be cured. The princess grabs some of the droppings into a bag and goes to the youth's house. She announces she has a cure for him, boils the droppings and cures him, then asks for a shawl and a ring as payment. She then returns home and summons her lover, who appears with sword in hand. The princess shows him the shawl and the ring and reveals she was the one that cured him from the injuries her sisters caused.

==== Wonderful Youth ====
In a South Indian tale from Gowda Kannada with the title "ಅದ್ಭುತ ಬಾಲಕ: ಸೌದೆಕೊಳ್ಳಿಯೊಳಗೆ ಅದ್ಭುತ ಬಾಲಕ ನಿರುವುದು, ಅವನು ಅನೇಕ ಸಾಧನೆಗಳನ್ನು ಮಾಡುವುದು" ("Wonderful Youth"), a king has three daughters, the elder two already married. He gives his cadette a bundle of wood, from which emerges a prince with magical powers. The prince tells the princess he is the son of a king of another country, and can be summoned with a golden fan and dismissed with a silver fan. The prince, named Kollikumara ("ಕೊಳ್ಳಿಕುಮಾರ", in the original), creates a palace for both with a magical stone. The elder sisters learn of this and plot to ruin their marriage: they pay her a visit and offer to prepare the water for their brother-in-law's bathtime, by placing some iron dust in the water, which is poisonous to Kollikumara. The prince is badly injured and goes back to his kingdom, leaving his lover alone. The princess cannot summon him with either fan, and decides to search for him. She dons a male disguise and wanders the world, until she stops to rest under an Ashvattha tree, where two parrots are perched. The birds talk to each other about Kollikumara's injuries and his cure: the bark of the ashvattha tree and their droppings, to be made into a paste to be applied onto the prince's wounds. The princess overhears their conversation, fetches the bark and the droppings, goes to Kollikumara's kingdom and cures him. She takes off the male doctor's disguise and reveals herself to him.

==== Soppina Guḑḑakka ====
In a Karnataka tale titled "ಸೊಪ್ಪಿನ ಗುಡ್ಡಕ್ಕ" or "ಸೊಪ್ಪಿನಗುಡ್ಡಕ್ಕ" ("Soppina Guḍḍakka"), the king asks his daughters whose fortune allows them to be fed: the elder princesses answer "her father's", and the cadette "her husband's". The king expels his daughter for this. Later, he has to go to the market, and asks which presents he can bring them. He sends an emissary to ask at his daughter's new house, but she is busy in the bath and asks the emissary to wait. The emissary tells the king she said "Wait", which the king misconstrues as an object. The king finds a prince with supernatural powers that gives him a box. The king delivers the box to the princess, which has a fan inside. One day, the princess fans herself and summons the supernatural prince. They fall in love and live together. The elder princesses learn of this, nurture envy towards their cadette, and pay her a visit. During the visit, the princesses spread thorns ("ಮುಳ್ಳು", in the original) on the bed to hurt their brother-in-law; he lies on the bed, is badly injured, and has to be called back via the fan. He vanishes and does not return, so the princess dons a yogi disguise and goes after him. On the road, she overhears a pair of birds talking about the prince's cure, which she fashions and goes to his kingdom to cure him. She removes the yogi disguise and they reunite.

=== Asia ===
Variants of the tale are reported by professor Lee Haring to exist in Bengal and Afghanistan.

==== South Asia ====
In a tale from the Indes collected by author Philippe Soupault and Ré Soupault and translated to French with the title Sabour, the Maharajah of Manipur has three beautiful and intelligent daughters. One day, he asks each of them where they place their trust: in their father or in themselves. The elder two answer that they depend on their father, while the youngest, named Sudha, answers she depends only on herself. For this, the Maharajah feels insulted and banishes his cadette to the forest, where she can rely on herself, while he marries his elder two to noble princes. Sudha builds a hut for herself in the forest, and her mother worries for her youngest daughter, but she cannot visit her. Some time later, the Maharajah decides to visit his neighbour, the Maharajah of Jaldwip, and asks his daughter what presents he can bring them. His wife reminds him to also ask Sudha, and they send a messenger. The messenger goes to talk to Sudha and she shouts for him to wait ("Sabour"). The messenger thinks Sudha has asked for a thing named Sabour, and reports to the Maharajah. The Maharajah goes to Jaldwip and finds gifts for his elder two, but cannot find Sabour. The monarch of Jaldwip understands what this Sabour means and gives the other a fan of peacock feathers. The Maharajah of Manipur returns home and gives Sudha the peacock fan, which she places on a corner of her hut. Later, during a hot summer, Sudha remembers about the fan and goes to use it: she waves it and suddenly a prince appears before her. He introduces himself as Saboursinh, the prince of Jaldwip, who Sudha can summon with the wave of a fan in one direction and dismiss him by waving it in another direction. Sudha and Sabour spend days together and fall in love, and Sabour transforms the humble hut in a sumptuous palace, furnished with gardens and servants. Sudha's elder sisters learn of their cadette's new luxurious accommodations and decide to pay her a visit, knowing about their brother-in-law and the magical fan. Soon, the princesses are taken by envy and devise a plan to get rid of the prince: they lie to him that a newly-wedded husband is to be anointed in their kingdom, and they smear a poisoned ointment on his skin. Sabour falls deathly ill and vanishes, while Sudha waves the fan to beckon him, but he does not return to her, so she decides to journey to Jaldwip to investigate. On the road, she ventures into a dense forest and stops to rest under a tree. Suddenly, she overhears the conversation between two eagles about prince Saboursinh, his infirmity, and the only cure: to touch the eagles' feathers on his body. Sudha fetches feathers from the pair of eagles and reaches Jaldwip, where she dons a male disguise and introduces herself as a doctor and cures prince Saboursinh with the feathers. For saving the prince, Sudha asks for a portrait of the prince and a veil as payment, then makes her way back to her house. Months later, she gives birth to a son, and summons Saboursinh with the fan. They reunite and live happily.

=== Africa ===
In a tale sourced from the Swahili and titled Saburi Nisali, a Sultan has seven daughters. One day, each of the six elder daughters goes to the shamba to make love to the overseer and returns home. After they return home, the mirrors they own become blackened. The youngest daughter goes to the shamba, is not seduced by the overseer, returns home and her mirror is still clean. One day, their father, the sultan, visits his daughters and they trick their father with the youngest's clean mirror. When the sultan sees a blackened mirror, he thinks it belongs to his youngest daughter, and banishes her to a hut near their house. Some time later, the Sultan has to travel to Zanzibar, and wishes to bring presents to his seven daughters. The sultan sends a servant to ask his seventh daughter what present she might want. The daughter, being interrupted, shouts at the servant "Saburi Nisali" ("Wait while I say my prayers"). The servant tells the sultan about "Saburi Nisali" and he decides to bring it to his daughter. In Zanzibar, the sultan asks everyone about the "Saburi Nisali", until he enters a merchant's house and Saburi himself appears to him. The sultan suspects something amiss with his daughter's request, but Saburi assures it is not the case. At any rate, Saburi - himself a jinn - gives the sultan a wooden box and riches and a golden fan inside. The sultan returns home and gives his daughter the wooden box. The youngest daughter takes the fan and fans herself, and Saburi appears. He summons his Jinns to build them a house and asks the sultan for her hand in marriage. The Sultan answers that his seventh daughter is not a virgin, but Saburi reveals the trickery of the mirrors. The Sultan punishes his six elder daughters and consents with Saburi's proposal. Furious at the discovery, the six sisters convince their youngest to ask about Saburi's only way to die: not bullet, nor fire, nor water, but broken glass. The sisters spread powdered glass on the couple's bed, Saburi lies in it and is badly hurt. He vanishes back to his kingdom with his Jinns, leaving his human wife. The princess disguises herself as a man and journeys to find Saburi. One time, she stops by a tree, where two birds talk about the cure for Saburi's ailment: leaves from that very tree. According to E. C. Baker, the tale was collected in Portuguese Nyasaland, from a Yao source, around 1917, whose father emigrated to the island of Ibo. Baker considered that the tale, along others that he collected, were "a fair sample of the tales current amongst Swahilis".

==== Southeast Africa ====
Professor Lee Haring noted that the Indian story of Prince Sabour also appears in Mayotte and Mauritius.

===== Mauritius =====
According to Sookdeo Bissoondoyal, at least three Mauritian variants have been registered from Indian immigrants.

In a variant collected by Charles Baissac, Zistoire Sabour or Histoire de Sabour ("The Story of Sabour"), before he leaves on a business trip, a rich merchant asks his three daughters what they want as a returning gift. The oldest wants a diamond necklace, the second a blue velvet dress, and the youngest says "Sabour" ("patience"). The servant relays the message to the merchant and he departs. The merchant asks about "Sabour", and an old woman says it is the name of the prince. Prince Sabour questions about the merchant's interest in him, and the merchant shows him the daughter's picture. Prince Sabour falls in love with her picture, and asks the merchant to give her a fan. Back home, the merchant gives her a box with the fan. When she waves the fan, the prince appears before her and proposes to her. Jealous of her happiness, the two sisters grind glass into powder and sprinkle it on Sabour's bed in their sister's chambers. Sabour and the third daughter marry, but their happiness is short-lived as the prince lies on the bed and the glass injures him. His wife uses the fan to send him home for safety. Seven months pass, and she reads on the paper that prince Sabour is terribly ill. The girl dresses up as a man, with a false beard and travels to his realm. On the way, she stops by a tree and overhears the conversations between two birds on how to cure prince Sabour: fetch their droppings ("fiente", in the French translation) and smear them on Sabour's skin. The next morning, the princess grabs some of the birds' excrement and journeys to Sabour's kingdom, where she introduces herself as a male doctor come to cure the prince. The king offers the doctor anything if he can heal the prince, and she, as the doctor, says the prince must agree to her terms. The princess, as the male doctor, presses the paste against Sabour's skin, and he is healed, then demands the prince marries his daughter. Sabour denies the request, for he is already married. The princess takes off the male disguise and reveals herself to Sabour. Baissac remarked that this tale came from India. The tale was republished as The Magic Fan of Sabour. Professor Haring remarks that the Mauritian tale indicates a process of creolization of the immigrant Indian population to the island nation. In the same vein, Baissac noted that the tale was one of their folktales, for they have found three versions from different sources.

In a Mauritian tale published by author Pahlad Ramsuran with the title Sabur ki katha ("Tale of Sabur"), a merchant has three daughters and asks what gifts he can bring them: the elder two ask for dresses and jewels, but the third asks for Sabur. In his travels, the merchant finds his elder two's gifts, but cannot locate the "Sabur". An old woman tells him the name refers to a prince of a neighbouring country, where the merchant travels to. He meets prince Sabur, who gives him a fan ("pankha", in the original), and advises him to give to his daughter, who is to use the fan when no one is looking. The merchant returns and gifts the maiden the "Sabur", which she uses alone in her room. Researcher Ashutosh Kumar interprets the "Sabur" of the tale as an object called "Sabura", a type of wooden instrument used for pleasure.

===== Mayotte =====
In a variant from Mayotte collected by Claude Allibert from teller Mahamudu Abiamri, Swaburi n' Swali, a king has six daughters, the youngest named Fatima. He gives his daughters a mirror as proof of their obedience to him: if they disobey him, their mirrors will appears as clouded. One day, the five elders decide to go to the chigoma (a celebration), while Fatima is asleep at the palace. When the elders return, they swap Fatima's mirror for another one and try to pass off her mirror as their own. When their father checks on them, Fatima takes the exchanged mirror to her father, who breaks it into her face and expels her from home. Now homeless, Fatima finds shelter with an old woman who lives in a rock. Some time later, when her father wants to travel and bring presents to his daughters, his ship will not depart. A mwalimu (diviner) advises the king to ask Fatima what she wants as a gift. When his messenger asks her, she says "Swaburi n'swali" ("Wait, I'm going to pray first"). The messenger relays the message to the king, who asks around for this "Swaburi n'swali". He discovers that "Swaburi n'swali" is the name of another king's son. He meets the youth, who gives him a tree trunk to present Fatima with it. Fatima gets the tree trunk and, some time later, her elderly companion asks her to cut it open: inside, she finds pieces of gold, a fan and a letter from Prince Swaburi n'swali, telling her to use the fan to summon him to her presence. The prince appears to her, learns of her father's mistreatment of her, marries her and they live happily.

== Analysis ==
=== Tale type ===
Folktale collectors and scholars have noted the similarities between the Indian tales and European tales about a bird prince. Mary Stokes recognized the motif of the glass powder on the bed as parallel to the shards on the window of the French tale by d'Aulnoy. Folklorists Johannes Bolte and Jiří Polívka grouped the Indian variants with other European tales that were classified by Antti Aarne as type 432, Der Königssohn als Vogel ("Prince as Bird").

Stith Thompson and Warren Roberts classified the Indian tales as type 432, "The Prince as Bird", in their Types of Indic Oral Tales. The Indian tales differ from the international variants in that the heroine's father brings her a fan, which she uses to summon the magical prince.

=== Role of the heroine ===
The female character of the Indian tale "The Princess who Got the Gift of Patience" can be considered a strong female character, with an active role in the story. In the same vein, Marilyn Jurich described the heroine of Prince Sabar as a trickster: she defies her father's system of values and beliefs, and offers him an honest opinion, despite being punished for it. She builds her own fortune and makes her own fate, just as she told her father. As the tale continues, she marries and heals her husband from an illness her sisters caused.

=== Motifs ===
These Indian tales contain the motif J1805.2.1, "Daughter says 'Sobur' ('Wait'); Father thinks it is a thing, finds Prince Sobur". The motif appears in tale type ATU 432, "The Prince as Bird", of the Aarne-Thompson-Uther Index.

In some tales, the heroine passes by a King Lear-type judgement (Motif H592), indexed as its own tale type in the Indian Tale Catalogue, AT 923B, "The Princess Who Was Responsible for Her Own Fortune".

==== The prince's appearance ====
The tales also contain the motif D1425.3., "Magic fan summons prince for heroine". According to scholar L. R. Heggade, in Konkani stories, the fan appears in a stone box, while in Kannada texts, the fan and the prince come from the wood.

== See also ==
- The Fan of Patience (Pakistani fairy tale)
- The Blue Bird (fairy tale)
- The Canary Prince
- The Three Sisters (fairy tale)
- The Green Knight (fairy tale)
- The Feather of Finist the Falcon
