= The Three Sisters (fairy tale) =

Italian literary fairy tale

"The Three Sisters" or Green Meadow (Italian: Verde Prato) is an Italian literary fairy tale written by Giambattista Basile in his 1634 work, the Pentamerone. It tells the story of a maiden having secret encounters with a prince with the use of magic, him almost losing his life and her having to search for a cure for him.

It is classified in the Aarne-Thompson-Uther Index as type ATU 432, "The Prince as Bird": despite lacking the prince in bird form, the narrative adheres to the type's description. Another Italian variant is The Canary Prince.

== Synopsis ==
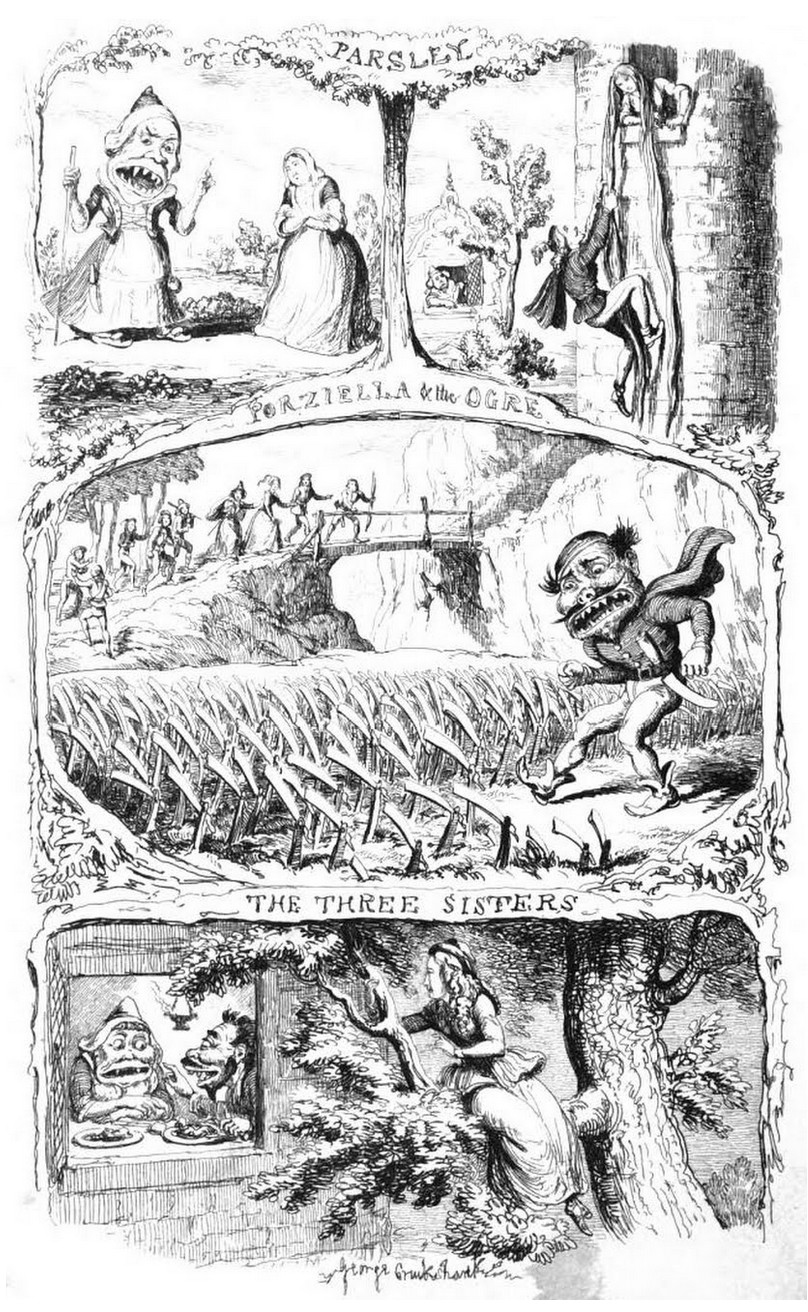
Bottom-wise: Nella spies the ogre couple talking about the cure for the prince. Illustration by George Cruikshank for The Story of Stories (1850).

A woman has three daughters; the two older are very unlucky but the youngest, Nella, is very fortunate. A prince marries her and hides her from his wicked mother, visiting her in secret. If she throws a powder in a fire, he can come to her on a crystal road. Her sisters discover this and break the road, and the prince is injured when he is coming to her.

He is dying. His father proclaims that whoever can cure him will marry him, if female, or have half the kingdom, if male.

Nella hears of this and sets out. Hiding in a tree, she overhears an ogre tell his wife about the illness, and how only the fat from their bodies can cure the prince. She climbs down and presents herself at their door as a beggar. The ogre, greedy for her flesh, persuades his wife to let her stay. When they sleep, Nella kills them and takes their fat. She brings it to the king and cures the prince. He says he cannot marry her because he is married already; Nella asks if he wants to be married to the person responsible, and the prince blames her sisters. Nella reveals herself as his wife. Her sisters are thrown in an oven.

== Analysis ==
=== Tale type ===
The tale is classified in the international Aarne-Thompson-Uther Index as type ATU 432, "The Prince as Bird": the heroine asks her father to bring a strangely-named object that leads her to the enchanted prince, whom she meets in secret; her sisters find out about the clandestine meetings and place blades or glass to hurt the prince, causing him to disappear; the heroine dons a disguise and goes after him; she overhears the conversation between two birds about the cure, which she uses on the prince.

Scholars Jack Zipes and D. L. Ashliman list the tale as a literary predecessor of the tale type.

Philologist Gianfranco D'Aronco classified the tale as Italian type 432, The Bird Lover. Also, according to D'Aronco, all the Italian variants he listed (among which, Verde Prato) showed the tale type's "essential structure": the bird lover, the lover wounded and the lover healed.

== Variants ==
=== Italy ===
Author Rachel Harriette Busk collected a tale from Rome with the title Il Vaso di Persa or The Pot of Marjoram: a rich merchant has three daughters. One day, he is ready to go to the market and asks his daughters what they want when he returns. The elder asks for shawls woven with golden threads, the middle one for coverlets of bird plumage, and the youngest asks for a simple pot of marjoram. The merchant travels abroad and finds his elders' gifts, but cannot find the flower pot. During his journey home, a strange-looking man accosts the merchant and offers him the flower pot, for a hefty price of three hundred thousand scudi. The merchant buys it. When he returns home, he gives his daughters the presents, and the youngest takes the flower pot to her room, shutting herself for quite some time. The elder sisters learn of the cost of the present to their cadette, and, spurred by jealousy, decide to destroy the pot. They convince their father to have their sister join him for walk, so she can leave the room. It happens thus and, while the girl is away, the sisters take the pot of marjoram and throw it out of the window, the pot shattering in pieces. When the girl returns, she discovers her sisters' deed and decides to leave home. She wanders off until she meets a "fairy" (Busk's translation for the original "fata"), who gives her male clothing and provisions for the road. She continues her travels and finds herself in a dense forest, and climbs a tree to rest. Some time later, a couple of bears stop by the same tree and begins to talk. The girl overhears their conversation (thanks to the fairy's powers): the bears discuss how the king of Persia fell out of the window of a high tower, broke his bones and has glass shards embedded on him, and how the only cure is fat from their bodies, that is to be melted with honey and wax, and to remove the glass he needs to be bathed in warm water. The girl kills the bears and takes their fat, melts them with honey and wax (also given by the fairy) and goes to Persia to cure the king. She cures the king by following the bears' instructions and spends some time in the king's palace. The king takes her as his queen.

=== Asia ===
In an Iraqi folktale, collected by E. S. Drower with the title The Crystal Ship, a merchant has to travel and asks his daughters what presents he can buy them. The youngest, as per her mother's suggestion, asks for "clusters-of-pearl". Travelling abroad, the merchant finds out that "clusters-of-pearl" is the name of "the son of the Sultan of the Jānn". He meets the prince, who gives the merchant a box with three hairs, to be given to his third daughter. The merchant returns home and gives the box to his youngest daughter, and builds a room to allow her encounters with the prince. She uses the three hairs to summon the prince and over the threshold, a lake appears, on it a ship of crystal with the prince. The prince advises her that, if anything should happen to him, for her to seek him out in iron shoes and with an iron staff. One day, the girl's sisters goad her into taking a bath with them and, while she is distracted, the eldest sister goes to her room. She finds the box and rubs the three hairs: the prince comes on the crystal ship and she, scared by the sight, screams. The ship breaks apart into splinters and some of them injure the prince. The ship and the lake disappear. Later on the same night, the girl tries to summon the prince by rubbing the hairs, but he does not appear and she suspects something afoul. She follows his instructions, and begins a quest wearing iron shoes and walking with an iron staff. She stops by a tree and overhear two doves (cucūkhtiain) talking about the prince's illness and the only cure for him: the doves' own blood and feathers, and some of the leaves of the very tree they are perched on. The girl kills the doves and prepares the cure, then goes to the city of Jânns to cure the prince.

==== Turkey ====
In the Turkish tale Yeşil İnci (The Green Pearl), originally collected by Naki Tezel and translated by German folklorist Otto Spies with the title Die Grüne Perle, a merchant prepares to go on a business trip, and asks his three daughters what he can bring them. The eldest daughter asks for a diamond earring; the middle one for a diamond pin, and the youngest for "Green Pearl", cursing her father not to return until he finds it. The merchant goes on his trip and finds his elder daughters' requests, but cannot finds the youngest's. When he embarks on his ship, it cannot move, and the merchant goes back to the market to ask again for "Green Pearl". A Jewish man answers that "Green Pearl" is the name of the son of the padishah of Yemen. The merchant goes to Green Pearl's court and explains the situation to him. The prince answers he cannot accompany the merchant back to his homeland, but gives him three boxes. One day, the third daughter takes the boxes to an empty square and opens the first two: from the first a palace appears, and from the second 40 servants that guide the girl to the palace. The next day, she opens the third box; a crystal bridge appears to her, with a rider coming to her. It is Green Pearl. The servants welcome him to the palace and he spends time with the girl. At one time, he warns her never to close the box while he is on the crystal bridge, lest he dies. Some time later, the girl's sisters decide to visit her. While the girl is taking a bath, one of her sisters enters her room and sees the three boxes, one closed and two opened. She opens the closed one and closes the open ones. The girl exits the bath and discovers that someone touched the boxes. She tries to summon Green Pearl again, but only the bridge appears, with no one on it. She lets the boxes open and finds a tree at the end of a trail, where two birds are talking. They converse about how to cure prince Green Pearl: the fat from the neck (oil from the hair, in Margery Kent's translation) of a Dew that sits under the tree. The girl overhears their conversation, kills the Dew and goes to Green Pearl's kingdom as a Jewish seller. Once there, she announces she has a cure for the prince, which she uses on him, and asks for her payment his ring and prayer beads. After curing him, she goes back to the square and opens the boxes to summon him. Green Pearl appears on a horse, sword in hand and poised to strike her, but she shows him the ring and the prayer beads, and he understands she was the one that cured him.

==== Iran ====
In an Iranian tale titled The "Pink Pearl" Prince, a merchant lives in Persia with his three daughters, Razia, Fawzia and Nazneen. One day, he has to go to Mecca on pilgrimage, and his daughters ask him to bring presents: Razia asks for diamond earrings, Fawzia for a diamond hairpin and Nazneen for a pink pearl, and curses her father not to return until he brings it. The merchant goes to Mecca and finds the earrings and the hairpin, but, having no luck in getting it, decides to embark on the ship with the other pilgrims. The ship does not move, and the other pilgrims notice it. The merchant disembarks and goes to look for the "pink pearl", who he learns is the name of the local king's son. Prince Pink Pearl tells the merchant he cannot go with him back to Persia, but gives him three boxes. The merchant returns home and gives the presents to his elder daughters, shows the boxes to Nazneen, and expels her from home for the troubles her request caused him. Nazneen takes the boxes with her and goes to an empty lot. She opens the first box and a palace appears to her. Next, she opens the second box and maidservants appear to welcome her to the palace. Nazneen spends some time in the palace, and decides to open the third box: a bridge appears before her with a prince on it. Prince Pink Pearl comes to her and explains she cannot close the third box while he is on the bridge, lest he dies. Pink Pearl and Nazneen fall in love with each other. Meanwhile, Razia and Fawzia decide to seek their sister. After they walk for a day, they reach a palace (their sister's) and are welcomed inside. Razia and Fawzia go to take a bath after their long journey, and Fawzia enters Nazneen's quarters. She peers into the third box and, seeing nothing, closes it. Razia and Fawzia return home with gifts. Nazneen goes to wait for the prince, but he never returns. Sensing something wrong, she goes back to her room and sees the closed box. Nazneen rushes out of her palace and wander off, until she stops to rest under a tree. Two birds perch on the tree and talk about the cure for the prince: the oil of the hair of the demon that sits near the tree. Nazneen kills the demon and, disguising herself as a doctor, goes to Pink Pearl's kingdom and cures him. She asks for the royal ring as her payment, and goes back to her palace. She opens the third box and Pink Pearl appears again. He sees the ring on her finger, and realizes she was the one that cured him.

=== Africa ===
According to researcher Emmanuel Plantade and scholar Hasan M. El-Shamy, tale type ATU 432 is also attested in tales from North Africa, in Egypt, Sudan, Algeria and Morocco.

==== Hausa people ====
In a variant from the Hausa people, the heroine, Lahidi, is mistreated by her father and lives in a separate hut. When her father asks her what he can bring her from the market, she answers "Ba-Komi" ("nothing"). Her father takes it to mean a thing named "Ba-Komi". He meets a man named "Ba-Komi" and when he goes home, tells his daughter that Ba-Komi shall meet her on a certain day. Ba-Komi comes and "alights on the roof" of her hut. Lahidi and Ba-Komi fall in love through repeated encounters. Lahidi's half-sister, suspecting something, puts thorns on the roof and, when Ba-Komi comes again, lands on the thorns and hurts himself. Lahidi discovers the ploy, shaves her head and disguises herself as a man to look for a cure for Ba-Komi, the King's Son. One day, deep in the forest, she stops by a Kainya tree and listens to the conversation of the Jipillima birds; one of them says their droppings can cure the king. Lahidi takes the droppings, brings them to Ba-Komi and heals him. The king's son pays the stranger with a ring, and visits Lahidi to kill her. Lahidi, now as herself, shows him the ring and they recognize each other.

In a tale collected from a Hausa teller in Zinder, Niger, with the title The Girl Who Saved The King’s Son, a girl goes to live with her father, her stepmother and her half-sisters. Her stepfamily shares everything among themselves, and give nothing to her. Her father goes to marketplaces to trade, and is always asked to bring presents by his family, and the girl asks nothing. One day, however, she has some coins with her which she gives to her father and asks him to bring her a bean cake. The man goes to the market and finds presents for his family, but not the cake for his daughter. Some courtiers take the man with him to the local prince's presence, who just happens to be called Bean Cake, and it is forbidden to call his name. The prince asks the man the reason for procuring "bean cake", and the man explains about his daughter's request. The prince then gives the man some bean cakes and says he will visit his daughter on Friday, so she is to prepare for his arrival. It happens thus: the man gives his daughter the food and tells her about the visiting prince; she readies her house and prince Bean Cake comes and "sits on the roof of her house". They spend time together, and, when he is ready to leave, he spits gold for her, and goes away. The next Friday, the girl's stepmother places some thorns on the girl's roof to hurt the prince when he comes a second time. The prince comes again and hurts himself in the thorns, enters the girl's house and can only spit blood instead of gold, then goes back to his kingdom. He cannot be healed of his injuries and does not return a third time to the girl's house. The next day, the girl shaves her head, takes a small bowl and drinking gourd with her and travels to the prince's kingdom to cure him. On the way there, she stops to rest by a tree, and overhears two birds talking about the injured prince and the way to cure him: mix the birds' excrement with water and give the drink to the prince. The girl takes the excrement, goes to the prince's kingdom and passes herself as a beggar who has come to cure the prince. She creates the remedy and heal the prince, then asks for his ring as payment, then returns to her house. The prince goes to the girl's house intent on killing her, but she shows him the ring as proof of her deed. They marry.

In a Hausa tale translated by missionary Adam Mischlich into German as Der Königssohn Nasamu ("Prince Nasamu"), the heroine asks for her father to buy "Nasamu" for her. Her father discovers "Nasamu" is the name of a prince, who meets the man and says he will visit his daughter by Friday by alighting on their roof. Nasamu visits his beloved at night, and leaves by morning, spitting some gold from his mouth in an empty pot. This goes on for some time, until the heroine's stepmother discovers the hidden coins and buys some needles to be placed on the roof. The next time Nasamu flies in, he is hurt badly by the needles, and hurries back to his home. As for the heroine, sensing her lover's disappearance, she leaves home in male's garments and carrying a calabash, and stops to rest by a tree. Suddenly, she begins to hear the conversation between many man-eating birds about Nasamu's injuries and the way to cure them: their excrement mixed with some water. The heroine fetches the birds' excrement, dowses it in water, and goes to Nasamu's kingdom to cure him. Posing as a doctor, she applies the cure on his body and asks for his ring as payment. She then returns home and waits for Nasamu. The prince flies in again, intent on killing his lover, thinking she betrayed him, but she shows him the ring. They reconcile, and Nasamu marries his saviour.

==== Morocco ====
In a Moroccan variant collected by Jilali El Koudia with the title The Sultan's Daughter, a sultan has three daughters, the youngest he loves best and grants all her wishes. The elder two become jealous of their father's attention, so the princess asks for her own palace to be built where she could live alone. The son of a neighbouring sultan learns of this and becomes interested in this princess. They contact each other, but the princess will only allow presential meetings with her by providing her with a hundred of anything she asks for, as well as by digging a tunnel beneath her palace to allow further meetings. They meet in secret, but rumours of their rendezvous reach the ears of her sisters, who plot against her: pretending their days of jealousy are over, the elder two pay a visit to their cadette and invite her for the hammam, a public bath house. While the princess is distracted there, one of her sisters rush to her palace to check on the secret tunnel. Suddenly, the sultan's son begins to traverse the tunnel - made entirely of glass -, and the princess's sister throws a stone at him. Part of the glass tunnel breaks and a shard injures him in the eye. The prince retreats back to his kingdom. The princess returns to her palace to wait for the prince, but, since he does not show up, she suspects something afoul, so she goes to check on the glass tunnel, and finds blood there. The princess realizes her sisters' doing, leaves the palace and meets a beggar woman. They trade clothes and she begins her quest for the prince. She stops to rest by a tree, and overhears the conversations between two pigeons: the ashes of their feathers can cure the prince. After the birds fall asleep, the princess catches and plucks their feathers to prepare the prince's cure. She then goes to the prince's kingdom to give him the remedy.

Muhammad El Fasi and Émile Dermenghem collected a Berber tale from Fez with the French title Perle dans sa branche ou la jeune fille intelligente et le roi des ogres (Berber: Ej-Jaouhar feghçanouh; English: "Pearl on a Branch, or The Smart Girl and the King of Ogres"). At the start of the tale, a man is ready to go on hajj asks his seven daughters what presents he can bring back from the journey: the six elders ask for caftan, a ring and other apparel, while the youngest, at her aunt's suggestion, requests Ej Jaouhar Feghçanouh ("Pearl on a Branch"). The man bids them goodbye, and leaves the girls at home. As the tale continues, the heroine, the youngest sister, with her sisters' help, humiliates a band of robbers and sells them to the local sultan. In the second part, their father finds the presents his daughters asked of him, save for "Pearls on a Branch". After finding a sheikh in the desert, he meets seven ghouls who give him two caskets with instructions to his youngest daughter. The man then returns from pilgrimage and delivers the gifts to his daughters. The youngest takes the box to the now empty robbers' den, opens up the first and burns its contents in a fire: several Black slavewomen appear and prepare the place for their master. After she returns from the hammam and puts on new robes, she opens up the second box and a small Black slave appears and explains she has married the king of ghouls, and that she is not to leave their manor. At night, the Black slave gives her a soporific drink and she falls asleep, allowing her fiancé, Pearl on a Branch, to come to their house via a glass entrance (tuyau). Some days later, a pair of doves perch on their window, and the male slave interprets their chirping as that her family is missing their youngest daughter. After some precautions, the girl returns home with gifts for her family. The next day, the sisters are ready to go to the female hammam, when one of them pretends to have forgotten her comb, and goes to the robbers' abandoned den in search of any clue to the mysterious lover. She then sees a large glass pipe, which she deduces is the way her sister's lover comes through, picks up a stone and smashes it. That same night, Pearl on the Branch appears via the pipe and is hurt by the glass shards. Thinking his human lover betrayed him, he orders his Black slave to kill her in the desert and bring back her bloodie shirt. Despite his master's orders, the Black slave feels sorry for his mistress, when a rooster jumps onto the slave's blade in place of the girl. The Black slave believes the rooster was a divine sign and considers the grisly order fulfilled, and leaves her mistress naked in the desert. The girl wanders through the desert until she finds a shepherd and fashions a cap out of a sheep's stomach, and puts on some rustic clothes, then goes on her journey. After some time, she stops to rest under a fig tree, where she hears the conversation between two doves about the Sultan of the ghouls and his injuries, and the cure: the doves' blood and wing feathers, mixed with the fig tree leaves. The girl kills the doves and prepares the remedy, then travels to the country of the ghouls to cure her lover. Once she arrives, she passes herself off as a hakim doctor, and spreads the remedy on the body of the Sultan of the ghouls. After he is fully healed, his Black slave enters his room and recognizes the doctor as his master's wife. The girl takes off her disguise, everyone is forgiven, and she lives happily with her lover. In his notes, Dermenghem remarked that the story was a combination of two narratives: the first part about a heroine that defeats the bandits (which also exists as an independent tale in the Fasis corpus as The smart girl and the forty thieves) and the second part that belongs to the cycle of Eros and Psyche.

== See also ==
- Cinderella
- Diamonds and Toads
- The Blue Bird
- The Canary Prince
- The Enchanted Snake
- The Feather of Finist the Falcon
- The Green Knight
- Prince Sobur
- The Green One in Glass
