= The Bird Lover =

International cycle of stories about a bird prince

The Bird Lover, also known as The Prince as Bird, is a type of narrative structure in folklore, no. 432 in the Aarne–Thompson classification system. In the typical version of the story, a woman acquires a bird lover—a nobleman in the shape of a bird—who is wounded by means of a trap set by the woman's husband, such as a set of sharp points set up outside the woman's window. She follows the wounded bird's trail, cures him, and then marries him.

In French scholarship, this type is often referred to as "l'oiseau bleu" or "the blue bird", so named for a story by Madame d'Aulnoy.

== Origins ==
Folklorist Jack Haney traced the origins of the tale type to France and Germany in the Middle Ages.

An example of the motif is found in one of Marie de France's Lais, "Yonec", though the lai develops somewhat differently: instead of a happy ending, the lai ends in tragedy. A "sophisticated rationalization" of the type is found in Chrétien de Troyes's Lancelot, the Knight of the Cart, where Lancelot appears at Guinevere's heavily barred window and cuts his fingers bending the bars back.

Swedish scholar Waldemar Liungmann also pointed Yonec as a predecessor to the tale type. However, he also noted that in tales of "later tradition", especially from India and Persia, the lover comes to the heroine in the shape of a bird, and in that regard cited the tale of "King Parrot", from a 15th century Turkish version of The Seven Wise Masters.

== Overview ==
Some variants may begin akin to type ATU 425C, "Beauty and the Beast": the third daughter asks her father for a present, a memento that belongs to the Bird Prince that she will use to contact him. In other tales, the heroine is trapped in a high tower, which is only accessible by the prince in his bird form. Whatever its beginning, the heroine's lover is eventually hurt in his bird form by blades, pieces of glass or thorns left by the heroine's sisters. The Bird Prince vanishes back to his kingdom and the heroine goes after him intending to heal his wounds.

A line of scholarship (e.g., Jan-Öjvind Swahn, Aurelio Macedonio Espinosa Sr., Georgios A. Megas) recognizes the independence of the narrative, but argues that it could fit as a subtype of the more general tale type ATU 425, "The Search for the Lost Husband", due to their proximity, e.g., in its motifs and in the heroine's quest for her lost supernatural husband.

=== Motifs ===
According to Samia Al Azharia Jahn, "in all Arabic variants", the Bird Prince is put in mortal danger by the use of glass.

In turn, according to Georgios A. Megas, the "characteristic motifs" of this type include the heroine overhearing the conversation between two creatures (animals, like birds and foxes) or two ogres about the prince's cure, the heroine killing the creatures (since their body parts are used in the cure), and the heroine asking the prince for a belonging as reward (a ring or towel).

According to Renato Aprile, the "most widespread" form of the tale type, which appears in variants from Denmark, Italy, Spain and the Balkans, involves the prince's animal transformation from bird to human form in his secret meetings with the heroine. Another tradition of the tale type lacks the avian transformation, appearing in texts from India to Turkey and in some Italian tales from Lazio and Sicily.

==== The gifts for the heroine ====
In an article in Enzyklopädie des Märchens, folklorist Christine Goldberg noted the many objects the heroine asks her father in variants of the tale type: a feather, a plant or branch, but also a mirror, a violin, or a book. In Indian variants, the heroine utters "Sobur" ('Wait'), which her father mistakes for an object. In the same vein, Samia Al Azharia Jahn stated that, in Arabic language variants, the heroine asks her father for a strangely named object, which also happens to be the name of the Bird Prince.

== Distribution ==
Haney stated the tale type enjoyed "worldwide distribution". In an article in Enzyklopädie des Märchens, folklorist Christine Goldberg noted that the tale type spreads from India to the Middle East, to Mediterranean countries, and in the American continent (North, Central and South) and in Africa.

According to professors Stith Thompson, Pino Saavedra, Anna Angelopoulou and Aigle Broskou, the tale type is "especially popular" in Mediterranean countries, being found in Iberian Peninsula and in Greece. In the same vein, professors Christian Abry and Marie-Gracieuse Martin-Gistucci stated that the tale type was "frequent" (fréquent) in the folklore of Italy, France and Corsica.

The ATU 432 folktype is also present in the folklore of Latin America, for instance, in Chile (The Parrot Prince). Further variants are found in Canada and New Mexico.

In the Typen türkischer Volksmärchen ("Turkish Folktale Catalogue"), by Wolfram Eberhard and Pertev Naili Boratav, both scholars identified a cycle of stories they classified as TTV 102, "Die Traube I" ("The Grape - Version I"), with 31 variants registered. These tales are comparable to the international tale type ATU 432, "The Prince as Bird".

German folklorists Otto Spies and Manfred Hesse stated that the tale type was "widespread" in the Arab-speaking regions, although with different motifs.

== List of tales ==
- The Blue Bird
- The Canary Prince
- The Three Sisters
- The Green Knight
- The Feather of Finist the Falcon
- Prince Sobur
- The Fan of Patience
- The Greenish Bird
- The Falcon Pipiristi
- The Green One in Glass

== See also ==
- The Crow (fairy tale)
- The White Bird and His Wife
- The Girl Langa Langchung and the Rooster

== Bibliography ==
- Thompson, Stith. The Folktale. University of California Press. 1977. pp. 102–103 and 181. ISBN 0-520-03537-2
