= The Green Knight (fairy tale) =

Danish fairy tale

The Green Knight (Danish: Den grønne Ridder) is a Danish fairy tale, collected by Svend Grundtvig (1824-1883) in Danish Fairy Tales (18??) and by Evald Tang Kristensen (1843-1929) in Eventyr fra Jylland (1881). Andrew Lang included a translation of Kristensen's version in The Olive Fairy Book (1907).

This tale combines Aarne-Thompson type 510A with type 425N, the bird husband, and type 432, the prince as bird. Others of the first type include Cinderella, The Sharp Grey Sheep, The Golden Slipper, The Story of Tam and Cam, Rushen Coatie, Fair, Brown and Trembling, and Katie Woodencloak; of the second two, The Feather of Finist the Falcon, The Blue Bird, and The Greenish Bird.

== Synopsis ==
A dying queen asked her husband to do whatever their daughter asked of him, and the king promised. The widow of a count and her daughter did everything to make themselves the princess's favorites (in some variants persuading the princess to have them stay at the castle), and then the widow told her that they could not stay unless the king married her. The princess implored the king to do it, and when his objections could not convince her, he remembered his promise to the late queen and married the woman.

As soon as she was her stepmother, the woman began to maltreat the princess. The king, seeing this, sent the princess to a summer palace, or had one built for her. He went there one day to bid her farewell because he was going on a long journey, to a great tournament. She told him to convey her greetings to the Green Knight. At the tournament, he met no Green Knight, but on the way home, he came through a forest where he found a swineherd, and on asking whose pigs they were, was told they were the Green Knight's. He went on and found the marvellous castle where the Green Knight, a handsome young man, lived. He gave him his daughter's greetings. The Green Knight had never heard of her—in some variants, he says she must have been thinking of the green of the graveyard—but makes the king welcome and gives him a gift: either a green book or a casket with his portrait.

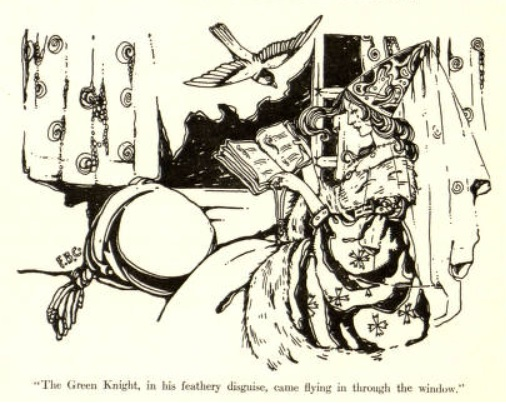
The Green Bird, in avian form, arrives to greet his beloved princess. Illustration for Princess Sorrowful and the Green Knight from a 1909 book.

The king returned home. In the variants with the book, the princess had not known why she had spoken of the Green Knight, and when she went through the pages of the book, he flew in as a bird and courted her; in the variants with the casket, she recognizes him as the man she dreamed of, and he comes to court her. In all variants, he visits her secretly, to avoid her stepmother, but her stepmother learns of it. In the bird variants, she puts a poisoned pair of scissors in the window; in the others, she puts a poisoned nail in the oar he used to row out. In all, he was injured visiting the princess and stopped.

The princess, not knowing why, is told by a bird, or overhears two birds talking, of his illness, and that a snake with nine young snakes in her father's stables could cure him. She got the snakes, went to the Green Knight's castle, and got a job in the kitchen. There, she persuaded them to let her cook the soup for him. For three days, she fed him a soup made from three of the young snakes, and he recovered.

In some variants, he went to the kitchen and recognized her; in others, she asked to marry him, and he refused because he had already promised to marry, and she cleaned herself up so that he recognized her. In all, they marry.

== Analysis ==
=== Tale type ===
The tale is classified in the international Aarne-Thompson-Uther Index as type ATU 432, "The Prince as Bird". Den gronne ridder is the name given to tale type ATU 432 in Ørnulf Hodne's The Types of the Norwegian Folktale.

=== Motifs ===
In an article in Enzyklopädie des Märchens, folklorist Christine Goldberg noted the many objects the heroine asks her father in variants of the tale type. However, in Danish and Norwegian variants, the heroine asks her father to greet the "Green Knight". Also, according to Swedish scholar Waldemar Liungmann, in "Northern" variants of tale type ATU 432, the bird lover is referred to as a "Green Knight".

== See also ==
- The Canary Prince
- The Enchanted Snake
- The Three Sisters
- The Falcon Pipiristi
