= The Canary Prince =

Italian fairy tale

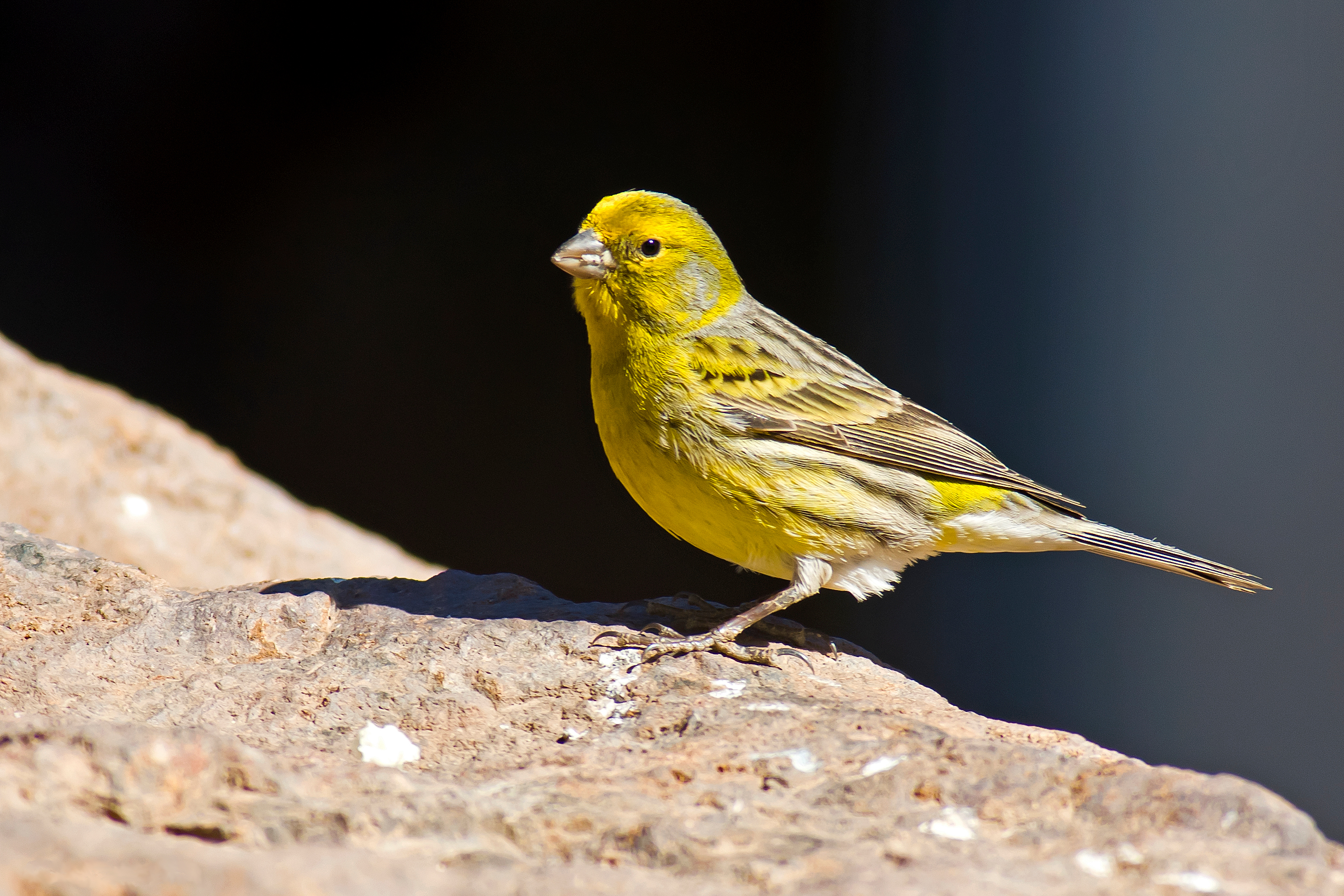
A male Atlantic Canary

The Canary Prince (Italian: Il Principe canarino) is an Italian fairy tale, the 18th tale in Italian Folktales by Italo Calvino. He took the tale from Turin, making various stylistic changes; he noted it developed a medieval motif, but such tales as Marie de France's Yonec produced a rather different effect, being tales of adultery. A variant on Rapunzel, Aarne–Thompson type 310, The Maiden in the Tower, it includes many motifs that differentiate it from that tale. Other fairy tales of this type include Anthousa, Xanthousa, Chrisomalousa, Petrosinella, Prunella, and Rapunzel.

== Synopsis ==
A jealous stepmother persuades her husband, the king, to lock his daughter in a castle in the forest. One day, a king's son goes by, hunting, and is astounded to see the abandoned castle in use. He sees the daughter, but they are unable to communicate except by gesture. A witch, to help them, tricks the ladies-in-waiting into giving the princess a book. When she ruffles the pages forward, her lover turns into a canary; when she ruffles them back, he is restored to his human form.

After some time, the queen arrives and sees a young man by the window, and puts pins on the window sill so that if the daughter leaned on it to flirt, she would be stabbed. These pins stab the prince in his canary form, and even when the princess restores him, the prince lies on the ground, bleeding, and his companions must bear him back to his father. The princess escapes by cutting up her sheets for a rope, and overhears witches talking of things; one describes how to heal the prince. She does so, and asks for his coat-of-arms, his standard, and his vest as her reward.

He goes hunting, and she turns him into a canary. When he flies to her room and she turns him back, he reproaches her for his injury. She produces her reward to prove that she saved him, and tells him that it was her stepmother's doing. They marry, and the daughter reveals to her father how wicked her imprisonment had been.

== Analysis ==
=== Tale type ===
In a review of Calvino's work, folklorist Walter Anderson classified the tale, according to the international Aarne-Thompson-Uther Index, as type AaTh 432, "The Prince as Bird".

=== Motifs ===
The episode of the heroine overhearing the animals that talk about how to cure the ailed prince occurs in tale type ATU 432, "The Prince as Bird".

== See also ==
- The Blue Bird
- The Enchanted Snake
- The Feather of Finist the Falcon
- The Frog Prince
- The Green Knight
- The Three Sisters
- The Enchanted Canary
