= Svetlana Orlova (actress) =

Soviet and Russian actress

- Born: 8 April 1956 (age 70); Kaliningrad, Russian SFSR, Soviet Union
- Years active: 1968–present

Svetlana Fyodorovna Orlova (Russian: Светлана Фёдоровна Орлова; born 8 April 1956) is a Soviet and Russian film actress. She has appeared in over forty roles and was dubbed the "first beauty of Soviet cinema fairy tales" for her roles in films such as Granddaughter of Ice, The Princess on a Pea, and Finist, the brave Falcon.

Born in Kaliningrad, Orlova's family moved to Alma-Ata in the Kazakh Soviet Socialist Republic when she was five years old. She excelled at ballet dancing at the local house of culture, and was invited to study at the Bolshoi Theatre's choreographic school at the age of nine. While walking in Moscow on a day off, was approached to appear Boris Buneev's Little Farm on the Steppe. She continued her studies with the Bolshoi, combining it with appearances in films, with her breakthrough role occurring when she was cast in Finist, the brave Falcon. She met her future husband while working on this project, and having achieved fame in cinema, she became a fulltime actress. She went on to appear in over forty roles in Soviet cinema during the 1970s and 1980s, before the early death of her husband in 1987. She has since become a fitness teacher, teaches choreography at a private school, and makes occasional appearances on television, and in roles in the New Year's performances on Sparrow Hills.

== Early life and career ==
Orlova was born in Kaliningrad on 8 April 1956. Her parents moved to the Kazakh Soviet Socialist Republic when Svetlana was five, and she grew up in a low-income family in Alma-Ata, where her maternal grandfather was a city prosecutor. Her mother, Valentina, was a factory worker, while her father, Fyodor, served time in prison for theft. The family life was violent. Orlova performed at a dance club at the local house of culture, where her talent was noticed during a visit by the commission of the Bolshoi Theatre's choreographic school. Orlova, then nine years old, was invited to study at the school in Moscow. She learnt ballet with the Bolshoi, and while walking in Moscow on a day off, was approached to appear in a film. This was Boris Buneev's Little Farm on the Steppe.

== Breakthrough roles ==
Orlova combined her studies at the Bolshoi, from which she graduated in 1974, with appearances in several other roles, before being cast in Finist, the brave Falcon. Written, cast, and originally to have been directed by Alexander Rou, his death before filming began led to it being taken over by Gennady Vasilyev. Cast in the leading female role as Alyonushki, Orlova worked with many established Soviet actors, including Georgy Vitsin, Mikhail Kononov, Mikhail Pugovkin and Lyudmila Khityaeva, and with Boris Grachevsky, a future film director, screenwriter, and actor. Orlova met her future husband, Yuri, while working on the film. Yuri, a doctor, was working with the film crew on The Taste of Halva, being filmed in the film studio beside Orlova's.

== Established fame ==
Yuri arranged a place for his wife in the dance ensemble "Variety Patterns" between 1975 and 1976, later becoming her film agent after she gave up her dance career for acting. During this time Orlova was asked to model for Vneshtorg, with her picture in fashion magazines and used to advertise Soviet goods internationally. Initially working under contract from 1976 until 1979, she joined the Gorky Film Studio in 1979.

Orlova appeared in over forty roles during the 1970 and 1980s. After starring in films such as Granddaughter of Ice, The Princess on a Pea, and Finist, the brave Falcon, Orlova was dubbed the "first beauty of Soviet cinema fairy tales". Her husband worked at a hospital and taught at the medical institute. He died suddenly of heart failure in 1987, at the age of 35, and two months before the birth of the couple's first child, a son named Filip. Orlova now found herself a single mother, supporting her son and her late husband's elderly parents. She appeared in fewer films during the last Soviet years, and after the dissolution of the Soviet Union in 1991, with 1988's Tree Sticks! being one example.

== Later career ==
She trained as an aerobics coach to support her filmwork, opening a class for sports aerobics in Moscow. She has not remarried. She makes occasional appearances on television, including a documentary film about Georgy Millyar, and a program to mark the fortieth anniversary of the release of Finist, the brave Falcon. She continues to teach choreography at a private school, and appears in roles in the New Year's performances on Sparrow Hills.

== Filmography ==
- 1970 - Little Farm on the Steppe - Marinka
- 1971 - Yesterday, Today and Always - Anyuta
- 1974 - Birds over the City - Lena
- 1974 - The Last Meeting - Anya Zadorozhnaya
- 1975 - Finist, the brave Falcon - Alyonushka
- 1975 - Until Dawn - Janinka
- 1976 - The Sun, the Sun Again - the bride
- 1976 - The Princess on a Pea - 3rd Princess
- 1976 - Nobody if not You - Nadia
- 1976 - The Legend of Siyavush - Queen of Sudaba
- 1976 - The Legend of Til - damsel
- 1977 - Killed While Performing - Nina
- 1977 - Provincial History - Lidochka Yurieva, actress
- 1977 - First Joys - Annochka Parabukina
- 1978 - Only a Drop of the Soul - Leia
- 1978 - Gift of the Black Sorcerer - Maid
- 1978 - The Forest You Will Never Enter - Ira
- 1979 - And the Day Will Come ... - Katya
- 1979 - Take Me With You - Alena
- 1979 - An Unusual Summer - Annochka Parabukina
- 1979 - Summer Tour - Alla Kasyanova
- 1979 - The Amazing Adventures of Denis Korablev - "The Snow Queen"
- 1980 - Granddaughter of Ice - Lyuba/Snow Maiden
- 1981 - Keep Your Eyes Open! - Anastasia, sister of mercy
- 1981 - Transitional Age - Mayka, former lover of Aurel
- 1981 - My Love - Revolution - Nina
- 1981 - Express on Fire - stewardess, passenger in the eighth carriage
- 1977-1984 - Roads of Fire
  - 1982 - Film 3. Singer of the Revolution (Episodes 9-12) - Lyubov Mikhailovna, actress of the Odessa theatre
- 1982 - Capture - Irina
- 1982 - Married Bachelor - Svetlana, Tamara's friend
- 1983 - Apprentice Doctor - lady of state
- 1984 - Very Important Person - cameo
- 1985 - Do Not Marry, Girls - Nadia, milkmaid
- 1985 - Alien Ship - cameo
- 1986 - We are Sitting Well! - Yanochka, skier
- 1987 - The Christians - Pustoshkina, witness in court
- 1987 - Stronger Than All Other Decrees - secular lady
- 1984-1987 - Clinic (film almanac) - Sveta
  - 1987 - Clinic - Sveta
- 1987 - Friend - saleswoman
- 1988 - Tree Sticks! - Grisha's wife
- 1991 - Revelation of John the First Printer - Tsarina Anastasia
- 1992 - Dance of the Devil (film-ballet) (film-play)
- 1993 - I want to America - cameo role
- 2003 - The Truth About Flicks - cameo role
- 2006 - How the Idols Left (documentary)
  - 2006 - Georgy Millyar
