= Koshchei =

Villain in Russian folklore

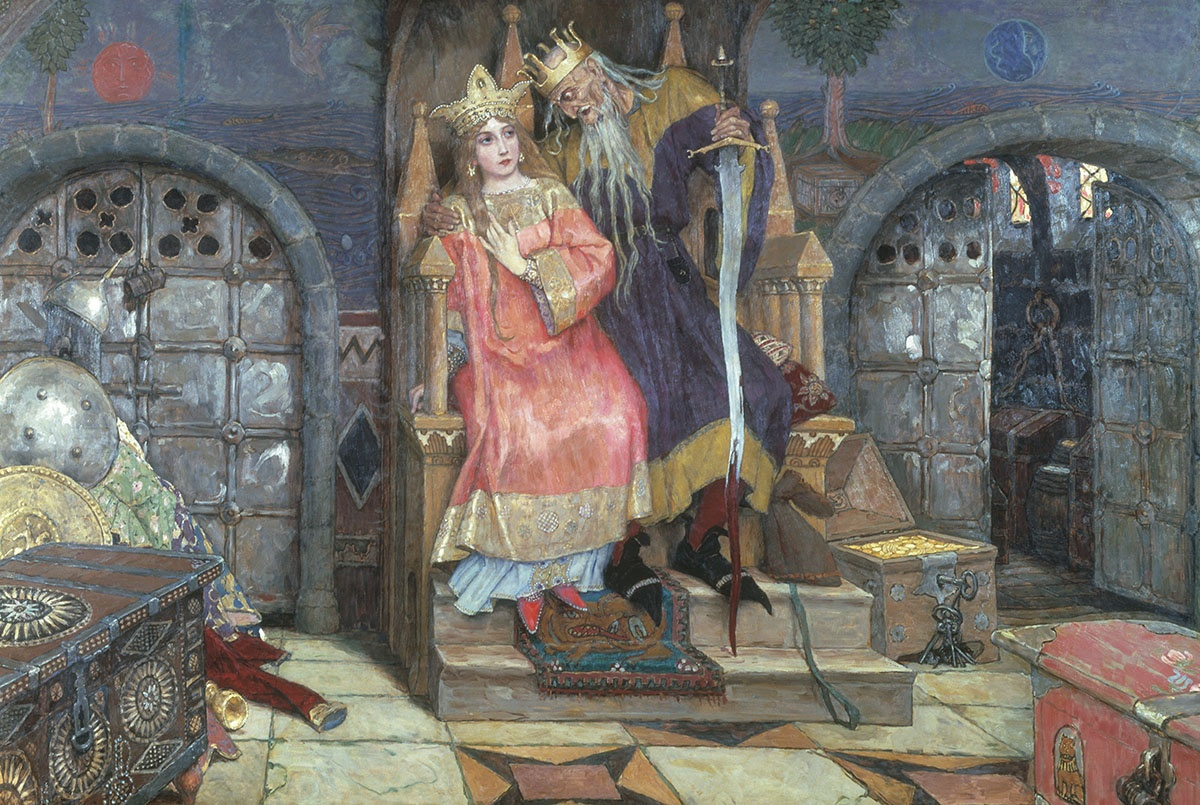
Kashchey the Immortal by Viktor Vasnetsov, 1848–1926

Koshchei (Russian: Коще́й, romanized: Koshchey, IPA: [kɐˈɕːej]), also Kashchei (Russian: Каще́й, romanized: Kashchey, IPA: [kɐˈɕːej]), often given the epithet "the Immortal", or "the Deathless" (Russian: Бессме́ртный), is an archetypal male antagonist in Russian folklore and mythology.

The most common feature of tales involving Koshchei is a spell which prevents him from being killed. He hides "his death" inside nested objects to protect it. For example, his death may be hidden in a needle that is hidden inside an egg, the egg is in a duck, the duck is in a hare, the hare is in a chest, the chest is buried or chained up on the faraway mythical island of Buyan. Usually Koshchei takes the role of a malevolent rival figure, who competes for (or entraps) a male hero's love-interest.

== Historicity and folk origins ==
By at least the 18th century, and likely earlier, Koschei's legend had been appearing in East Slavic tales. For a long period, no connection was made with any historical character.

=== Origin in Khan Konchak ===
The origin of the tale may be related to the Polovtsian (Cuman) leader Khan Konchak, who dates from the 12th century. (Note: Konchak is an important antagonist in the Tale of Igor's Campaign) In The Tale of Igor's Campaign Konchak is referred to as a koshey (slave). (Note: In Leonard A. Magnus's translation: "Shoot, my liege, the heathen Konctik the slave".) Konchak is thought to have come/returned from Georgia (the Caucasus) to the steppe c. 1126–1130; by c. 1172 he is described in Russian chronicles as a leader of the Polovtsi, and as taking part in an uprising. There is not enough information to reconstruct further details of Konchak's appearance or nature from historical sources; though unusual features or abnormalities were usually recorded (often as epithets) by chroniclers, none are recorded for Konchak.

The legendary love of gold of Koschei is speculated to be a distorted record of Konchak's role as the keeper of the Kosh's resources.

Koschei's epithet "the immortal" may be a reference to Konchak's longevity. He is last recorded in Russian chronicles during the 1203 capture of Kiev, if the record is correct this gives Konchak an unusually long life – possibly over 100 years – for the time this would have been over six generations.

Koschei's life-protecting spell may be derived from traditional Turkic amulets, which were egg-shaped and often contained arrowheads (cf. the needle in Koschei's egg).

It is thought that many of the negative aspects of Koschei's character are distortions of a more nuanced relationship of Khan Konchak with the Christian Slavs, such as his rescuing of Prince Igor from captivity, or the marriage between Igor's son and Konchak's daughter. Konchak, as a pagan, could have been demonised over time as a stereotypical villain.

=== Naming and etymology ===
In the Explanatory Dictionary of the Living Great Russian Language of Vladimir Dahl, the name Kashchei is derived from the verb "kastit" – to harm, to dirty: "probably from the word "kastit", but remade into koshchei, from 'bone', meaning a man exhausted by excessive thinness". ("Bone" here is in Russian кость kost'.) Vasmer notes that the word koshchei has two meanings that have different etymologies: "thin, skinny person, walking skeleton" or "miser" – the origin of the word "bone"). Old Russian "youth, boy, captive, slave" from the Turkic košči "slave", in turn from koš "camp".

Koschei, as the name of the hero of a fairy tale and as a designation for a skinny person, Max Vasmer in his dictionary considers the original Slavic word (homonym) and associates with the word bone (common Slavic *kostь), that is, it is an adjective form koštіі (nominative adjective in the nominative case singular), declining according to the type "God".

Numerous variant names and spellings have been given to Koschei; these include Kashchei, Koshchai, Kashshei, Kovshei, Kosh, Kashch, Kashel, Kostei, Kostsei, Kashshui, Kozel, Koz'olok, Korachun, Korchun bessmertnyi, Kot bezsmertnyi, Kot Bezmertnyi, Kostii bezdushnyi; in bylinas he also appears as Koshcheiushko, Koshcheg, Koshcherishcho, Koshchui, Koshel.

The term Koshey appears in Slavic chronicles as early as the 12th century to refer to an officer or official during a military campaign. Similar terms include the Ukrainian Кошовий (Koshovyi) for the head of the 'Kish' (military) (see also Kish otaman). In Old Russian 'Kosh' means a camp, while in Belarusian a similar term means 'to camp' and in Turkic languages a similar term means 'a wanderer'. The use as a personal name is recorded as early as the 15th century on Novogrodian birch bark manuscripts.

In The Tale of Igor's Campaign a similar sounding term is used, recorded being inscribed on coins, deriving from the Turkic for 'captive' or 'slave'. The same term also appears in the Ipatiev Chronicle, meaning 'captive'. A second mention of the term is made in The Tale of Igor's Campaign when Igor is captured by the Polovtsi; this event is recorded as a riddle: "And here Prince Igor exchanged his golden saddle of a prince for the saddle of a Koshey (slave)."

Nikolai Novikov also suggested the etymological origin of koshchii meaning "youth" or "boy" or "captive", "slave", or "servant". The interpretation of "captive" is interesting because Koschei appears initially as a captive in some tales.

== In folk tales ==
Koschei is a common villain in east-Slavic folk tales. Often tales involving him are of the type AT 302 "The Giant Without A Heart" (see Aarne–Thompson classification systems). He also appears in tales resembling type AT 313 "The Magic Flight".

He usually functions as the antagonist or rival to a hero. Common themes are love and rivalry.

The typical feature in tales about Koschei is his protection against death (AT 302). To kill him you must find his death which is hidden inside an egg. The egg is hidden inside various animals, and which are then protected by containers or in remote places.

In other tales, Koschei can cast a sleep spell that can be broken by playing an enchanted gusli. Depending on the tale he has different characteristics: he may ride a three- or seven-legged horse; may have tusks or fangs; and may possess a variety of different magic objects (like cloaks and rings) that a hero is sent to obtain; or he may have other magic powers. In one tale he has eyelids so heavy he requires servants to lift them (cf. the Celtic Balor or Ysbaddaden, or Serbian Vy).

The parallel female figure, Baba Yaga, as a rule does not appear in the same tale with Koschei, though exceptions exists where both appear together as a married couple, or as siblings. Sometimes, Baba Yaga appears in tales along with Koschei as an old woman figure, such as his mother or aunt.

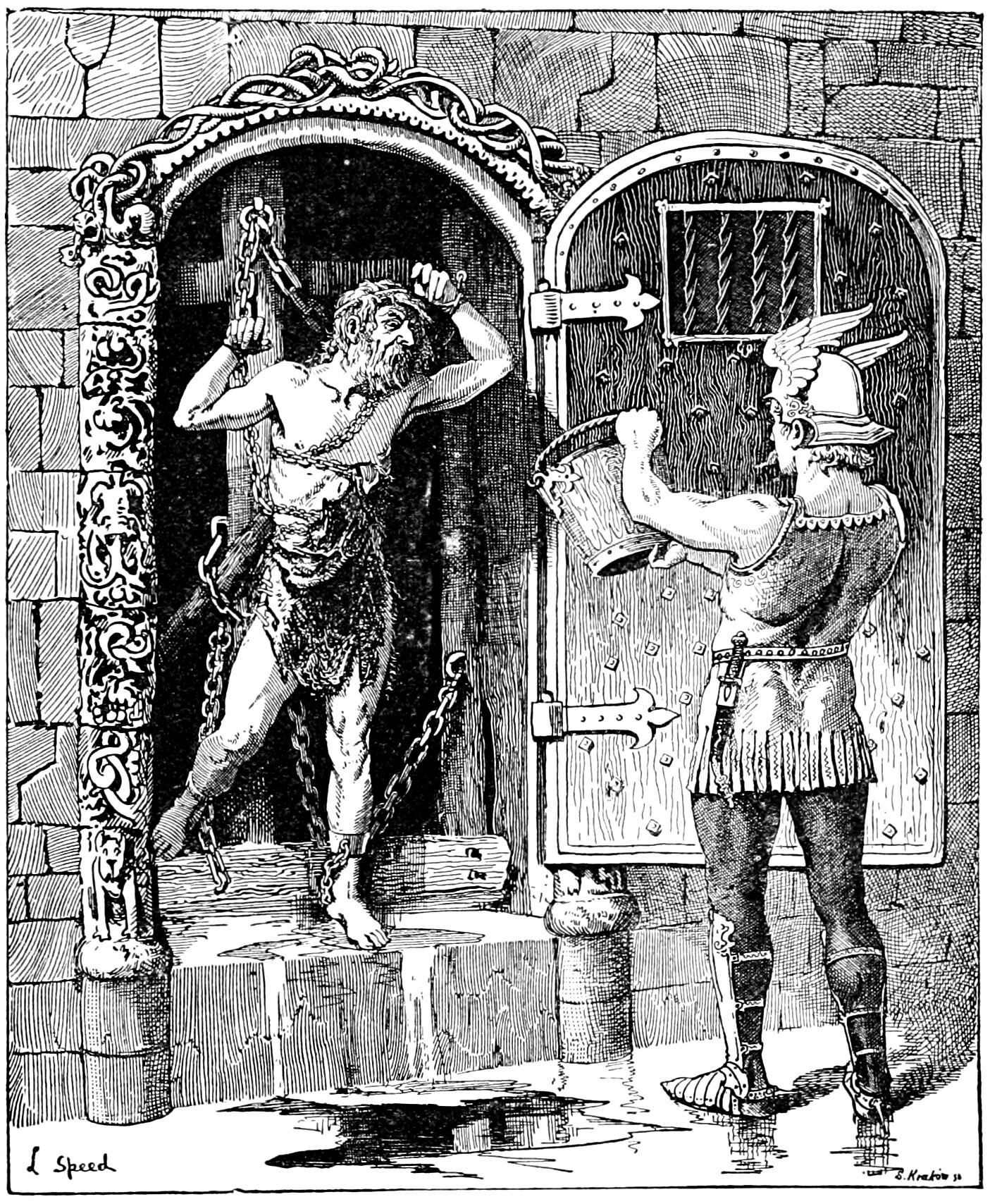
Koschey revived by Ivan with water, from Marya Morevna (The Red Fairy Book, 1890)

=== "Marya Morevna" ===
In the tale, also known as "The Death of Koschei the Deathless", Ivan Tsarevitch encounters Koschei chained in the dungeon of Marya Morevna (Ivan's wife). He releases and revives Koschei, but Koschei abducts Marya. Ivan tries to rescue Marya several times, but Koschei's horse is too fast and he easily catches up with the escaping lovers. Each time Koschei's magical horse informs him that he could carry out several activities first and still catch up. After the third unsuccessful escape, Koschei cuts up Ivan and puts his body parts in a barrel which he throws into the sea. However, water of life revives Ivan. He then seeks out Baba Yaga to ask her for a horse swifter than Koshei's. After undergoing several trials he steals a horse and finally successfully rescues Marya.

=== "Tsarevich Petr and the Wizard" ===
Tsar Bel-Belianin's wife the Tzaritza is abducted by Koschei (the wizard). The Tsar's three sons attempt to rescue her. The first two fail to reach the wizard's palace, but the third, Petr, succeeds. He reaches the Tzaritza, conceals himself, and learns how the wizard hides his life. Initially he lies, but the third time he reveals it is in an egg, in a duck, in a hare, that nests in a hollow log, that floats in a pond, found in a forest on the island of Bouyan. Petr seeks the egg, freeing animals along the way – on coming to Bouyan the freed animals help him catch the wizard's creatures and obtain the egg. He returns to the wizard's domain and kills him by squeezing the egg – every action on the egg is mirrored on the wizard's body.

=== "The Snake Princess" ===
In "The Snake Princess" (Russian "Царевна-змея"), Koschei turns a princess who does not want to marry him into a snake.

=== Ivan Sosnovich ===
Koschei hears of three beauties in a kingdom. He kills two and wounds a third, puts the kingdom to sleep (petrifies), and abducts the princesses. Ivan Sosnovich (Russian Иван Соснович) learns of Koschei's weakness: an egg in a box hidden under a mountain, so he digs up the whole mountain, finds the egg box and smashes it, and rescues the princess.

== Similar folklore figures ==
The Serbian Baš Čelik (Head of Steel); Hungarian 'Lead-Headed Monk'; and Slovak 'Iron Monk' also all hide their weakness inside a nested series of animals.

== In works of fiction ==
Koshchei is mentioned as a miser in the prologue Pushkin's Ruslan and Ludmila which describes wonders of the fairy-tale land of Lukomorye: "Там царь Кащей над златом чахнет" (There king Kashchei is languishing over gold).

=== Opera and ballet ===
- The villain in Igor Stravinsky's ballet The Firebird.
- Nikolai Rimsky-Korsakov wrote an opera involving Koschei, titled Кащей бессмертный, or Kashchey the Deathless.

=== Film ===
- Kashchey the Immortal, Russian Кащей Бессмертный, 1945 B&W fantasy directed by Alexander Rou, with Georgy Millyar as Koschei.
- Fire, Water, and Brass Pipes, Russian Огонь, вода и… медные трубы, Ogon, 1968 fantasy directed by Alexander Rou, with Georgy Millyar as Koschei.
- New Year Adventures of Masha and Vitya, Russian Новогодние приключения Маши и Вити, 1975 children's film.
- Beloved Beauty, Russian Краса́ ненагля́дная, 1958 stop-animated film.
- Along Unknown Paths, Russian Там, на неведомых дорожках, 1982 children's fantasy. Aleksandr Filippenko as Koschei.
- After the Rain, on Thursday, Russian После дождичка в четверг, 1985 musical children's fantasy. Oleg Tabakov as a postmodern, deconstructed version of Koschey.
- Sitting on the Golden Porch, 1986 fairy tale film directed by Boris Rytsarev.
- Lilac Ball, Russian Лиловый шар, 1987 science fiction.
- The Book of Masters, Russian Книга Мастеров, 2009 fantasy.
- The Last Warrior, Russian Последний богатырь, 2017 fantasy. One of the few versions in which Koschey is not a villain.
- Sisu, Finnish 2022 movie involving a backstory where the seemingly immortal protagonist Aatami Korpi (played by Jorma Tommila) was dubbed Koschei by the Soviet soldiers.
- How to Save the Immortal; Russian title: Кощей. Похититель невест, "Koshchey. A Bride Snatcher", is a 2022 Russian animated film with Koschei as a protagonist who gets redeemed for true love.

=== Television ===
- In Little Einsteins, Katschai is a nesting doll who tried to steal the music power from the magical Firebird. Katschai used animal nesting dolls to try to stop the Little Einsteins team from getting to the Firebird which Katschai had locked up at the top of a building in Russia.
- In the US television series "Grimm", in episode 9 of season 3, Koschei is the main guest character. (see Red Menace (Grimm))

=== Novels and comics ===
- In Mendele Mocher Sforim's allegorical Yiddish novel Di Klatsche (The Nag; 1873), Koschei appears to the protagonist Srulik in the form of a wolf.
- In Sarah J Maas's A Court of Silver Flames, Koschei the Deathless is the name given to an ancient being trapped by a spell in a lake and is believed to be a death god like his siblings mentioned in the previous books.
- In James Branch Cabell's Jurgen, A Comedy of Justice, and in Robert A Heinlein's retelling of the story Job: a Comedy of Justice, Koshchei the Deathless appears as the most supreme being who made things as they are and is therefore universally unappreciated before Jurgen's kind words are spoken. Notably, the character of Jurgen (whose wife is kidnapped when, in his vanity, he wishes to be free of her) blames his own inability to experience romantic love on Dorothy la Désirée, his first lover who, after a two-month affair when Jurgen was 16, allowed herself to be "stolen" by another man.
- In Alexander Veltman's Koshchei bessmertny: Bylina starogo vremeni (Koshchei the Immortal: A Bylina of Old Times, 1833), a parody of historical adventure novels, the hero, Iva Olelkovich, imagines that his bride has been captured by Koschei.
- Mercedes Lackey's novel of Stravinsky's Firebird features Katschei as the main villain, retelling the classic tale for a modern audience.
- Catherynne Valente's novel Deathless is a retelling of the Koschei story set against a backdrop of 20th-century Russian history.
- In the 1965 science-fiction Monday Begins on Saturday by Arkady and Boris Strugatsky, he is one of the creatures held in the NIIChaVo institute.
- Koschei appears as a character in John C. Wright's "War of the Dreaming" novels. He offers to save the hero's wife, if the hero will agree to take the life of a stranger.
- Koschei appears as a slave to Baba Yaga in the Hellboy comic book series, first appearing in Hellboy: Darkness Calls. Koschei's origin story is later revealed in backup stories to single issues of Hellboy: The Wild Hunt. The story is also collected in Hellboy: Weird Tales and expanded upon in Koshchei the Deathless. A sequel series, Koshchei in Hell later appeared in 2023.
- In the webcomic PS238 by Aaron Williams, the child hero 84 is currently trapped in Koschei's egg, trying to find the "eye", and in doing so, will become his new Champion of Earth to battle from now on.
- Koschei is the primary antagonist in Marina Frants's short fiction piece "Death Becomes Him", the sequel to "A Bone to Pick".
- Katherine Arden's novel, The Girl in the Tower, features Kaschei as the main antagonist. It is the second book in the Winternight trilogy, which is inspired by various Russian folktales.
- In Alix E. Harrow‘s novel, The Once and Future Witches, Koschei the Deathless appears as a wicked witch in an old Russian witch tale.
- "Koschei" appears as the real name of the Master in the Doctor Who spin-off novels, Divided Loyalties and The Dark Path.

=== Games ===
- In the fantasy tabletop role-playing game Dungeons & Dragons, he is the inspiration for the demon lord Kostchtchie, published 1983 in Monster Manual II.
- Koschei appears as a character in the MMORPG RuneScape, under the name "Koschei the Deathless".
- In the video game series The Incredible Adventures of Van Helsing, the Death of Koschei is a key plot item in the second game. In the third game, recurring supporting character Prisoner Seven is revealed to be Koschei the Deathless, and becomes the main antagonist.
- In the computer game Dominions 4: Thrones of Ascension, Koschei appears as a hero character for Bogarus, a faction inspired by medieval Russia and Slavic mythology.
- The legend of Koschei the Deathless serves as an inspiration for the narrative of Rise of the Tomb Raider.
- Koschei features in the Czech role-playing board game Dorn in the expansion Dorn: Koschei's Eternal Return.
- Koshchei is the name of a member of the Hvergelmir research institute in Genshin Impact. He is said to be a "bio-alchemist" who created numerous chimeric monsters.

== See also ==
- Lich
