= Sitting on the Golden Porch =

- Russian: На златом крыльце сидели
- Directed by: Boris Rytsarev
- Written by: Alexander Khmelik; Boris Rytsarev
- Starring: Yelena Denisova; Gennady Frolov; Sergey Nikolaev; Aleksandr Novikov; Mikhail Pugovkin
- Cinematography: Mikhail Goykhberg; Sergei Zhurbitsky
- Edited by: Lyudmila Drozdova
- Music by: Yevgeny Botyarov
- Production company: Gorky Film Studio
- Release date: 1986
- Running time: 72 min.
- Country: Soviet Union
- Language: Russian

Sitting on the Golden Porch (Russian: На златом крыльце сидели, romanized: Na zlatom kryltse sideli) is a 1986 Soviet children's fantasy film directed by Boris Rytsarev.

== Plot ==
The film tells of two kings: Fedot and Amfibrakhy, who have been side by side for a long time. Suddenly Amfibrakhy disappeared, leaving the queen and daughter. It was too difficult for the Queen to rule the state alone and she decides to marry her daughter. Fedot had three sons, one of whom was able to conquer the heart of Alena and liberate Amfibrakhy.

== Cast ==
- Yelena Denisova as Princess
- Gennady Frolov as Ivan-tsarevich
- Sergey Nikolaev as Pavel-tsarevich
- Aleksandr Novikov as Pyotr-tsarevich
- Mikhail Pugovkin as Tsar Fedot
- Tatyana Konyukhova as tsaritsa
- Leonid Kuravlyov as king Amfibrakhy
- Lidiya Fedoseyeva-Shukshina as Queen
- Viktor Sergachyov as Koschei
- Zinovy Gerdt as Vodyanoy
