= Funny Magic =

- Directed by: Boris Rytsarev
- Written by: Nina Gernet; Grigory Yagdfeld
- Produced by: Ivan Morozov
- Starring: Marina Kozodaeva; Andrey Voinovsky; Valentina Sperantova
- Cinematography: Lev Rogozin
- Edited by: S. Esaulenko
- Music by: Mikhail Marutayev
- Production company: Gorky Film Studio
- Release date: 1969
- Running time: 66 min.
- Country: Soviet Union
- Language: Russian

Funny Magic (Russian: Весёлое волшебство, romanized: Vesyoloye volshebstvo) is a 1969 Soviet fairy tale film directed by Boris Rytsarev based on the play by Nina Gernet and Grigory Yagdfeld.

== Plot ==
Picking unknown flowers in the field, girl Katya did not even suspect that she had found the miraculous Kashchei's grass that could cast a spell on Vasilisa the Beautiful. The old cleaning lady Akulina Ivanovna told the girl about this, in the distant past Baba Yaga. Riding on a broomstick, they fly out of the library window towards adventures, grabbing a magic book, without which Kashchei cannot be defeated in any way.

== Cast ==
- Marina Kozodaeva as Katya
- Andrey Voinovsky as Lisichkin
- Valentina Sperantova as Akulina Ivanovna / Baba Yaga
- Elizaveta Uvarova as Kikimora
- Valentin Bryleev as Leshy
- Fyodor Nikitin as Kashchei the Immortal
- Natalya Enke as Zoya Petrovna
- Svetlana Smekhnova as Vasilisa the Beautiful
- Zinaida Vorkul as episode (uncredited)
