= The Feather of Finist the Falcon =

Russian fairy tale

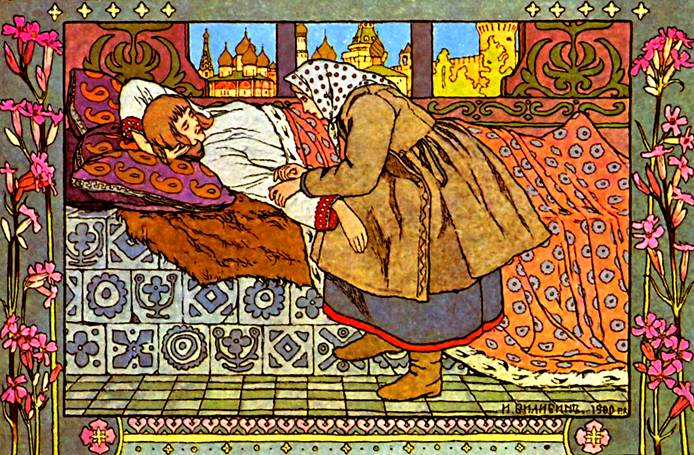
Illustration by Ivan Bilibin

The Feather of Finist the Falcon or Finist the Falcon (Russian: Пёрышко Финиста ясна сокола, romanized: Pyoryshko Finista yasna sokola) is a Russian fairy tale collected by Alexander Afanasyev in Narodnye russkie skazki. It is Aarne–Thompson type 432, the prince as bird. Other tales of this type include The Green Knight, The Blue Bird, and The Greenish Bird. Variants of the tale are primarily known in Russia.

== Synopsis ==
A merchant asked his three daughters what they want him to bring them from the fair. The older two ask for dresses or shawls, but the youngest wants either the feather of Finist the Falcon or a red flower. In some variants, he went to the fair twice, able to bring back what her older sisters had asked for, but not hers, but she did not vary her request. In the third or first visit, he found the feather, or else found the flower and must promise that his daughter will marry Finist the Falcon for it. Whether the flower or the feather, the thing brought Finist the Falcon to her at night, and he wooed her. If she was given the flower, he gave her a feather that would magically aid her.

Her sisters discovered the visit; they might have spied, or she may have appeared in finer clothing, from use of the feathers, than they knew she had, or she may have appeared in church as a strange woman (like Cinderella at the ball) because of her rich clothing, and not hidden it quickly enough when she returned home. Once they became suspicious, they often listened and, hearing a man's voice, tried to persuade their father that their sister had a lover, but failed. However they discovered it, the sisters put knives in the window, so that he was injured. He said that she must search for him to find him, which would wear out three pairs of iron shoes, and three iron staves. He did not return. She sets out to find him.

She finds a hut with a witch (sometimes referred to as a Baba Yaga), who gives her a gift (such as a silver spinning wheel and a golden spindle), and sends her on to another witch. This witch gives her another gift (such as a silver dish and a golden egg), and sends her on to yet a third witch. This one gives her a third gift (such as a golden embroidery frame and a needle that sewed of itself), and sent her to the castle where Finist was to marry.

In some variants, she found someone trying to wash the blood from Finist's shirt and washed it herself. In all, she managed to trade the witches' gifts to the bride to let her stay a night with Finist. The princess either put a magical pin in his hair to keep him asleep or gave him a sleeping draught; the third night, either Finist is warned not to drink the draught, or the pin falls out. He woke and knew her.

In some variants, he asked the nobles whom he should marry: the woman who had sold him, or the woman who had bought him. They agreed the woman who bought him should have him.

In other variants, she went home to her father. When he and her sisters went to church, she dressed finely and went with Finist, and her sisters came back with stories of the prince and princess who came to church. The third time, her father saw the carriage stopped at his own door, and the daughter had to confess. She married Finist.

== Translations ==
The tale was translated as The Little Feather of Finist the Bright Falcon by Robert Nisbet Bain; as The Bright-Hawk's Feather by Nathan Haskell Dole, and as Fenist the Bright-Eyed Falcon by James Riordan.

== Analysis ==
=== Tale type ===
The tale is classified in the international Aarne-Thompson-Uther Index as type ATU 432, "The Prince as Bird". In Russia, particularly, the tale type is known as Finist iasnyi sokol ("Finist the Bright Falcon), - also the name of type SUS 432 of the East Slavic Folktale Classification (Russian: СУС, romanized: SUS).

Russian researcher Varvara Dobrovolskaya stated that type SUS 432 figures among some of the popular tales of enchanted spouses in the Russian tale corpus. Similarly, Russian scholar Vladimir Propp, in his work The Russian Folktale, stated that the tale was "quite popular [in Russia]", with at least ten variants registered.

=== Motifs ===
==== The falcon prince's name ====
James Riordan, scholars Andreas Johns and Vladimir Propp related the name Fenist or Finist to the mythological Phoenix, and Riordan and Johns believed it to be a "corruption" of the latter's name. Particularly, Johns suggested that the bird's name (in Russian, feniks) was brought into the folklore of Rus' by an external source, possibly written.

==== The heroine's journey ====
According to Dobrovolskaya and Johns, after Finist flies to parts unknown, the heroine commissions iron garments from a smith and journeys to find Finist. On the way, she passes by the huts of three Baba Yagas and is gifted golden and silver objects (among which, distaff, spindle, yarn, combs, apples, a dish and an egg). The Baba Yagas also advise her to reach Finist's location, where his new wife is, and draw out the objects for her or her servants, which she must not sell, but trade them for one night with Finist. In the same vein, noted Swedish scholar Jan Öjvind-Swahn that, in Russian variants of tale type 425, "The Search for the Lost Husband", the heroine's helpers are incarnations of Baba Yaga.

== Variants ==
The East Slavic Folktale Classification (Russian: СУС, romanized: SUS), last updated in 1979 by folklorist Lev Barag, registers variants only in Russia.

=== Russia ===
Dobrovolskaya also remarks that in regional variants from Karelia, Murmansk and Arkhangelsk, type 432 sometimes merges with type 425A, "The Search for the Lost Husband", where the heroine receives gifts from the witches (Yagas) and uses them to buy from a false bride three nights in her husband's bed.

==== Predecessor ====
Professor Jack V. Haney stated that the tale first appeared in printed form in 1795, with the title "Сказка о финифтяном пёрушке ясного сокола". In this tale, a king has three daughters, the youngest called Marya Premudraya (Marya the Wise). One day, he has to go on a journey and asks what gifts he can bring them: the elder two ask for pretty dresses and Marya for the bright feather of a clear falcon, since she knows that Ivan-korolevich has been changed into one. The king gives Marya the feather, which she puts by her window, and Ivan, in bird form, flies in through her window. Later, Marya's sisters go to church and notice her sister is wearing fine dresses, then spy on her inside her room talking to Ivan. Some time later, when Marya is asleep, her sisters place blades and knives on the window, for the next time Ivan flies in. It happens as they plotted: Ivan, in bird form, hurts himself in the blades, writes a farewell message to Marya, and flies away to another kingdom. Marya wakes up, sees the blood on the window and reads his message, then commissions three iron garments, three iron canes and three iron wafers ('prosvir', in the original). Marya begins her quest and passes by the huts of three Baba Yagas spinning on chicken legs. The Baba Yagas tell Marya Ivan is their nephew, and has since married to another person. However, they still help Marya by giving them a silver saucer with a golden egg, a magic tablecloth that makes drinks appear and a towel that summons amusements. The third Baba Yaga advises her to stop by the garden when she reaches Ivan's city, and to trade the three objects for a night with her husband. Finally, Marya reaches another kingdom where Ivan-korolevich rules jointly with an Empress. Marya goes to the Empress's gardens and draws out the wonderful objects to attract the attention of the Empress. The woman goes to talk to Marya and wishes to have the objects, but Marya makes a deal: each object for one night with Ivan (the saucer and egg on the first day, the tablecloth on the second, and the towel on the third). To hinder Marya, the Empress tries to make Ivan drunk by giving him enough beverages, but he avoids her trap and pretends to fall asleep. Meanwhile, Marya tries to wake him up on the first two nights, but only manages it on the third. They talk the whole night and, the next day, Ivan takes Marya to his court. He then asks the assembled noblemen which woman he should keep: one that endured dangers and risked her life to find him, or one that sold him? The noblemen reply the first one, and Ivan leaves with Marya.

==== Regional tales ====
===== Fenisno-Bright-Falcon-Feather =====
Russian folklorist Ivan Khudyakov published a Russian tale titled "Фенисно-ясно-сокол-пёрышко" ("Fenisno-Bright-Falcon-Feather"), which he collected from Zholchin, a village in Ryazan. In this tale, a merchant has three daughters. One day, he plans to go to the market, and asks his daughters which presents he can bring them: the elder asks for some dress fabric, the middle one for a handkerchief, and the youngest for Fenisno-Bright-Falcon-Feather. The merchant finds only the elders' presents, forgetting the youngest's. The second time, the elder asks for a bracelet, the middle one for rings, and the youngest reiterates her request. Once again, her father forgets about the youngest's present. Lastly, he goes a third time to the market; the elder asks for a pair of satin shoes, the middle one for a ring and the youngest for the feather. After the third time, the merchant brings home the youngest's gift: the feather. Some time later, the girl's elder sisters notice that their cadette is spending too much time in her room with the feather, and decide to spy on her: they discover the feather summons a king's son. One night, they give enough drinks for their cadette to fall asleep, and place knives on the latter's window. The next time the bird prince flies in, he hurts himself in the knives. Badly injured, he leaves a message for the girl to look for him beyond 30 lands, and flies away. The girl wakes up, sees the blood on the window and begins to cry, then asks her father to allow her to go after Fenisno. She commissions three iron garments, three iron canes and three iron wafers, then begins her quest. She passes by the spinning huts of three Baba Yagas, who say Fenisno-Bright-Falcon-Feather is their relative, and each gives her a gift: the first a silver dish with a golden apple, the second a silver needle with golden thread, and the third a golden hoop with a self-sewing silver needle. Finally, the girl reaches the kingdom where Fenisno is, and sees a black-haired girl trying to wash Fenisno's bloodied shirt. The girl offers to wash the shirt, which she cleans up, but the black-haired girl takes the credit for the deed. Later, the merchant's daughter takes out the golden and silver objects to draw out the black-haired girl's attention, so she can trade them for three nights with Fenisno-Bright-Falcon-Feather. the merchant's daughter tries to wake Fenisno on the first two nights, but fails, and only manages to wake him up on the third night. The next morning, the whole court is assembled, and Fenisno asks them which wife he should be with, one that sold him, or with the one that went looking for him with iron garments. The guests reply he should be with the wife that "sweated blood" for him. Agreeing with their answer, Fenisno orders the execution of the second wife, and marries the merchant's daughter.

===== The Feather of Bright Finist the Falcon =====
Folklorist Jeremiah Curtin translated a Russian variant from Vologda with the title The Feather of Bright Finist the Falcon. In this version, the third daughter asks for a red flower, which acts as the object that summons "Bright Finist the Falcon of Flowery Feathers". Her father finds the flower and gives it to his third daughter, with a reminder that the flower was a wedding gift from Finist himself. That night, the girl is visited by Finist, who flies in through her window. At dawn, before he departs, Finist gives the girl one of his feathers. At three consecutive Sundays, the girl's family goes to mass, and she, at home, uses Finist's feather to create beautiful dresses for her to go to church with. The sisters overhear a secret conversation between the lovers and place knives by the window. Finist flies in, hurts his foot, and rushes back to his kingdom. After days of his absence, the girl decides to go after him. On her journey, the heroine learns that Finist has been betrothed to a Tsar's daughter, and meets three Baba Yagas in their chicken-legged huts. Each Baba Yaga gives the heroine a gift: the first, a golden hammer and diamond nails; the second, a golden plate with a diamond ball; and the third, her quick steed. The heroine uses the gifts to buy three nights with her husband from the Tsar's daughter (the false bride).

===== Bright Feather of Fifilis =====
In a Russian tale collected by ethnographer Dmitry Zelenin from Vyatka Governorate with the title "Фифилисно ясно перышко" ("Bright Feather of Fifilis"), a man's third daughter goes to church in fine clothes, astonishing everyone in attendance. Later, her father asks what presents he can buy his three daughters: the elder two ask for dresses, and the youngest for the bright feather of Fifilis. After she gains the feather, Fifilis flies in through her window and gives her another dress to go to church with. The next day, when she is at church, her sisters place knives in the windowsill for the next time he comes. Fifilis flies and is hurt in the blades, then asks his beloved to search for him beyond three mountains and three lakes. The girl goes after him in iron garments and with iron wafers, and meets three old women on spinning chicken-legged huts. The women state that Fifilis is to be married to Baba Yaga's daughter. The girl is given a golden egg with a dish, which she uses to trade for a night with Fifilis. Baba Yaga's daughter allows for their encounter; Fifilis dismisses Baba Yaga's daughter and lives with the girl.

===== Finist - Bright Falcon (Korolkova) 1 =====
In a tale collected from writer and storyteller Anna N. Korolkova with the title "Финист — Ясный Сокол" ("Finist - Bright Falcon"), a widowed peasant has three daughters; his youngest, called Maryushka, helps him to manage the farm, while the elder two occupy themselves with decorating themselves with make-up and dresses. One day, the man has to go to the market, and asks what presents he can bring them: the elder two ask for a shawl and another with golden flowers, while Maryushka asks for the feather of Finist, the Bright Falcon. The man finds the shawls, but cannot find the feather. The next time, the elder two ask for boots with silver horseshoes, while the youngest reiterates her request. The third time, the elder two ask for dresses and again Maryushka asks for the same feather. The girls' father finds the dresses, but cannot seem to find the feather, until he meets an old man just outside the city, who has the feather and gives it to the man. The man returns home with the gifts: the elder two mock Maryushka's request, but the girl pays no heed to them and goes to her room. When the house is asleep, Maryushka throws the feather to the ground and summons Finist: he comes in by the window as a falcon and leaves by morning. Their meetings continue for three days, but on the fourth, the elder sisters learn about the encounters and place knives by the windowsill, while Maryushka is asleep. Finist tries to fly in to her beloved's room, but is hurt by the knives. He says he can be found if one wears down three pairs of iron shoes, three iron staves and three iron hats, then departs. Maryushka heard Finist's word and wakes up, but the falcon has flown away, leaving only a trail of blood on the knives. After a while, Maryushka decides to go after Finist, commissions the iron equipment, and begins a journey through fields, forests and mountains, until she reaches a clearing where a chicken-legged hut lies, a Baba Yaga living inside. The Baba Yaga explains that Finist is living in a distant kingdom, married to a sorceress queen that bewitched him, and gives the girl a silver saucer with a golden egg, for her to use to trade for a night with Finist. Maryushka continues her journey, despite the danger; a cat appears to her and tells her to soldier on, and she reaches the hut of a second Baba Yaga in a deep, dark forest, where she is given a silver hoop and a golden needle that sews with gold and silver in crimson velvet. Finally, she continues until she reaches another clearing, after a dog encourages her to keep walking, and meets a third Baba Yaga, who gives her a self-moving golden spindle with a silver bottom that spins golden thread. After meeting the Baba Yagas, a gray wolf appears to help Maryushka, and takes her on its back to a crystal tower, and bids her hire herself as a servant to the sorceress queen. Maryushka offers her services to the queen as a spinning woman. At night, she takes out the silver saucer and golden egg to check on Finist, and cries for him. The queen overhears her tearful words and wishes to have the silver saucer, but Maryushka trades it for one night with Finist. She tries to wake him up, to no avail. The next day, the girl uses the silver hoop and golden needle to embroider a nice towel for him, when the queen overhears her and wishes to have the marvellous object. Again, Maryushka trades for a night with him, and again he is sound asleep. On the third day, Maryushka trades the golden spindle for a final night with Finist, but he is fast asleep. When the day is nearly dawning, her tears fall on his shoulder, creating a burning sensation that wakes him up. Finist sees Maryushka and they make their way out of the kingdom, but the queen spots them and calls the princes and merchants for an official meeting. During the gathering, Finist poses them a question: which is better, a wife that loves, or one that sells and deceives? The assembly answers that Maryushka is the better wife for him, and Finist remains with her.

===== Fenist-Bright Falcon (Korolkova) 2 =====
In another tale collected from Anna N. Korolkova with the title "Фенист-Ясный Сокол" ("Fenist-Bright Falcon"), a rich peasant lives with his three daughters, the youngest named Maryushka. The girl is also the most diligent and busies herself with doing the household chores. One day, he tells them he has to go to the market, and asks his daughters what gifts he can bring them: the elder two ask for shawls decorated with flowers, while Maryushka asks for the feather of Fenist Bright Falcon. The first time he goes to the market, he cannot find the gift for his youngest. The next time, his elder daughters ask for a pair of boots, one gold and the other silver, and Maryusha reiterates her request. Once again, he cannot seem to find the feather. Lastly, he goes a third time to the market; his elder two ask for sundresses and an apron. While still looking for the feather of Fenist, the rich peasant meets an old man carrying a box under his arm. The old man says he has the feather, but it is most prized possession, and prophesizes that whoever has the feather shall be his son's bride. The peasant barters with him and buys the feather. He brings the presents back to his daughters and gives Maryusha the feather. The girl takes out the feather and it becomes a prince. They talk for a while, until the prince says he will fly for a while in the air. Maryushka opens the window for him, he beats the ground and becomes a bird. While he is away, Maryushka's sisters overhear their conversation and report to her father. The man spins a story about needing to go to his daughter's room to check her dead mother's caftan for moths, but Maryushka says she already did it for him, then goes to sleep. Her sisters seize the opportunity to place knives in the window, and Fenist flies in the blades, injuring himself. He proclaims that whoever wants to find him shall wear out three iron dresses, three iron caps and three iron canes, then flies away. Maryushka wakes up and sees the blood on the window, then tells her father she plans to go to Jerusalem on a pilgrimage. Her father agrees. Maryushka commissions the iron garments from a blacksmith and begins her quest through fields, forests and meadows. On her journey, she passes by the spinning huts of three Baba Yagas, who each give her a gift: the first a silver saucer with a golden egg, the second a silver paddle for a loom and a golden spindle, and the third a silver hoop and a self-sewing golden needle that can embroider patterns in crimson velvet. The third also lends Maryushka a gray wolf that will carry her to the kingdom where Fenist is. The wolf carries Maryushka to Fenist's kingdom, and she finds work there as a maidservant to his new wife. Maryushka trades the Baba Yagas' wonderful objects for three nights with Fenist, and manages to wake him up on the third. Fenist and Maryushka change into a pair of blue-gray doves and fly away to Maryushka's home. As they land, Fenist gives her another feather, and she has but to wave it. One day, she wants to go to church, and waves Fenist's feather to summon a carriage and a wonderful dress. She also decorates her hair with diamonds and pearls and goes to church. There, her elder sisters notice the mysterious attendant, and back home tell Maryushka about it. They notice their cadette's hair decoration and suspect she was at church, so decide to spy on her: they see Fenist fly in as a bird, and place sharp knives and daggers on the window. Fenist is hurt again, and tells Maryushka to wear out three pairs of iron shoes, three iron caps, three iron canes and three iron wafers in search for him. Maryushka tells her father she wishes to go to Jerusalem on a pilgrimage again, and meets the same Baba Yagas, who tell her this time Fenist has married the "mistress of the sea". The Yagas give her a brocade towel and a golden egg, a golden hammer and twelve diamond nails, and a horse with a crown, and advise her to wait for the mistress of the sea to come out of the water, and trade her the wonderful objects for three nights with Fenist. Finally, Maryushka reaches a beautiful beach with a bush nearby, and waits for mistress of the sea to appear. She comes out of the water and sees Maryushka with the towel, wishing to have it. Maryushka trades it for one night with Fenist, and goes to the mistress's underwater crystal palace. She fails to wake him up on the first night, trades the hammer and nails for a second night, and also cannot wake Fenist. Lastly, she trades the horse, which can eat hot coals, with the mistress of the sea, and wakes Fenist. Fenist reunites with Maryushka, and convenes with a synod to ask them which is better: to live with a wife that sells or with one that buys? The synod agrees a wife that buys is better to live with, and Fenist takes Maryushka back to his kingdom.

===== Finist - Bright Falcon (Nizhny Novgorod) =====
Russian folklorist Nikolai V. Morokhin collected a tale from Nizhny Novgorod with the title "Финист-ясен сокол" ("Finist - Bright Falcon"). In this tale, a father is going to the bazaar and asks his three daughters what he can buy them. The elder asks for a handkerchief, the middle one for earring and the youngest, named Mashenka, for Finist-Bright Falcon. The father finds his youngest daughter a falcon: he remains a bird by day, and a human by night. Her sisters begin to hate the bird, and Finist decides to fly back to his kingdom to bring gifts for her. He flies and returns, but loses most of his feathers and has to fly back. Mashenka goes out of the door and tries to call him out with a song. Finist goes back and brings gifts for Mashenka.

===== About Filist (Pudozh) =====
In a tale from Pudozh titled "Про Филиста" ("About Filist"), a pair of siblings live with their father. The brother lulls his sister to sleep by singing a song about a future suitor for her: Filist, the Bright Falcon. She grows up and questions her brother about this Filist, but the brother, now older, dismisses it as a figment of his childhood. He goes to heat up the bath house and an old man tells him how his sister can find Filist: she is to follow three horses that will lead her to Filist. The horses stop by a barn, everything unlit inside. The girl finds a hut in the back of the property and meets a witch there. The witch tells her that Filist is indeed handsome, with hair of gold and silver, and gives her some matches to see him at night. The girl goes to the barn and lights up the matches to see him, but a spark falls in his hair and he disappears. The girl goes back to the witch in the backyard and she admonishes the girl, for now she has to endure three years of searching with iron boots, iron canes, iron bread. The girl goes to a smith to fashion the iron accessories and begins her quest. She goes to the huts of the witch's sisters, and gains from each a golden object: a golden reel, a golden spinning wheel, and a golden spindle. At last she finds Filist, but he is under the power of the Yaghi-Baba, which the girl bribes her with the golden objects for three nights with him. Despite the name of the male character, typical of Russian type 432, the compiler noted that the tale was closer to type 425A.

===== The Feather of Fefelist =====
In a Russian tale collected in Bashkortostan with the title "Фефелисто перышко" ("The Feather of Fefelist"), an old couple has three daughters. One day, the man prepares to go to the market, and asks his daughters what they want as return gifts: the elder asks for a gown or a sarafan, the middle one for a "китаечки", and the youngest for the bright feather of Fefelist. At the market, he finds presents for the elder two, but cannot find the feather. He meets an old woman in the streets who gives him the feather, and says the girl is to open the window. The man returns home and gives the presents to his daughters, the youngest getting the feather and being mocked by her sisters. Some time later, the family goes to church on a Sunday, hit the youngest daughter with a ladle and leave her. She takes the opportunity to summon Fefelist, who comes in by the window and gives her nice clothes to go to church mass. The people admire her, and she says she comes from the "ladle", then returns home. One the next Sunday, she is hit in the head with a bar of soap, summons Fefelist to give her nice clothes, goes to mass and says she comes from the country of "soap", and on the third Sunday, she is hit by a comb, goes to church with clothes Fefelist provided, and says she is from the country of "comb". On hearing this, the elder sisters realize the guest is their younger sister, and go back home to spy on the girl and Fefelist. On the fourth Sunday, the sisters place needles on the windowsill, Fefelist tries to fly in and is hurt, then makes a turn and flies back home. The girl goes after him and reaches the spinning house of a Baba Yaga, who takes her in, gives her three pairs of boots, three wafers and three canes so she could walk to Baba Yaga's sister. The girl continues on her journey and travels to the second Baba Yaga, who gives her a ball to throw and follow to the third sister. Lastly, she goes to the third sister, a very old lady, who says Fefelist will have a wedding tomorrow, and gives the girl a spinning wheel she must trade for a night with Fefelist. The girl takes the spinning wheel and bribes a young woman to have access to Fefelist. Fefelist meets his former lover, but refuses to take her back, thinking she tried to kill him. Next, the third old lady gives her a splendid reel the girl trades for a second night, and even tries to persuade Fefelist, but again he refuses. Finally, the girl is given a silver saucer with a golden egg. The young woman at first refuses to let Fefelist go, but relents and lets Fefelist go back with his first beloved, and both move out to a city.

===== Finist (Dobrovolskaya) =====
In a tale collected by researcher V. E. Dobrovolskaya from an informant named Konstantina Vasilyevicha Nyrkova with the title "Финист" ("Finist"), in a certain kingdom a man lives with his three smart daughters. One day, he has to go to the market and asks what gifts he can bring back: the elder two ask for garments, while the youngest asks for the feather of bright falcon Finist. The man finds the garments in the market, but cannot seem to find the feather, until an old man appears and offers him one. The man returns home and gives his daughters the respective gifts, the youngest gaining the feather. She goes to her room and throws it on the floor; Finist flies in as a bird, jumps on the floor and becomes a prince. They spend nights like this, with Finist bringing gifts. One day, however, the elder sisters learn about the clandestine encounters and place knives and needles on the window. The next time Finist appears, he hurts himself in the blades and makes a escape back to his kingdom. His human beloved wakes up and spots the blood on the window, then decides to go after Finist. The girl traverses a dense forest and finds a hut spinning on chicken legs. Inside, a Baba Yaga welcomes her. The girl tells of her problems, and Baba Yaga gives her three magical objects: a golden apple that rolls over a plate and reveals images; a self-threading spindle, and a self-sewing needle. The witch also points her the direction to Finist's kingdom. The girl arrives there at last, and finds out that Finist is to be married to a neighbouring princess. The girl takes out the magical objects and trades them with the princess for three nights with Finist, each object for each night. On the first two nights, the princess gives Finist a sleeping potion, so he cannot react to the girl's pleas. On the third night, the girl's hot tears fall on Finist's face and he wakes up. They recognize each other, and expel the princess.

===== Fetist - Bright Falcon (Kovalev) =====
In a tale collected from Russian storyteller Ivan F. Kovalev with the title "Фетист-Ясный Сокол" ("Fetist - Bright Falcon"), a man has three beautiful daughters. One day, he has to go to the fair in a distant town, and asks his daughters what presents he can bring them: the elder two wish for nice clothes, while the youngest, Masha, keeps her peace. Their father insists she asks for something, and she requests a scarlet flower. The man then departs and buys the clothes for his elder daughters, but cannot seem to find the scarlet flower. On the journey back, he helps an old man on the road and tells him about his problem. The old man produces a scarlet flower and gives the man, but with a condition: Masha must marry the old man's son, since the flower is a betrothal gift to whichever girl requests it. The man takes in this information, and returns home to deliver the gifts to his daughters. The elder two admire their dresses and mock Masha. Later, the family goes to church and leave Masha at home. The girl stays in her room and admires the scarlet flower, when she waves it and suddenly a falcon flies in through the window, falls to the ground, and becomes a human prince. They introduce themselves: Masha says she is Marya Ivanova, and the prince says he is Fetist, the Bright Falcon, who can be summoned to his bride by simply waving the flower. After three months of secret meetings, Masha asks Fetist about his background: for refusing to marry a sorceress, he was cursed into falcon form for three years, and Masha has to keep him a secret, so the curse can be lifted after the appointed time. At that precise moment, Masha's family has come back home, and Fetist flies away as a falcon, which is heard by the elder sisters. The girls ask her cadette about a stranger in their house, and notice Fetist's feather in the ground. Later, Masha's father tries to have a frank conversation with her, saying she spends too much time in her room, and, after he brought the flower, they had never seen her fiancée. Masha then blabs about her secret lover Fetist, and the man, in falcon form, appears by her window. Fetist admonishes her about telling their secret, when he had but a week left, and, if Masha wishes to see him again, she will have to wear out iron boots and an iron cane. Fetist departs, and leaves Masha to her fate. After a period of grief, Masha decides to search for Fetist: her father gives her his blessings, she commissions from a blacksmith the iron equipments, and begins her journey. She reaches a deep forest, and meets a very old Baba Yaga in her spinning chicken-legged hut. After spending a night there, the first Baba Yaga gives Masha a ball she has to throw and follow to her elder sister, and bids her trade Masha's scarlet flower with the second Baba Yaga. Masha follows her instructions and meets the second Baba Yaga, who gives her a pipe to use if the third Baba Yaga forces Masha on some tasks, and directs her there. Masha reaches the third Baba Yaga sister, named Yaga Yagshina, and is made to herd her stallions for three days. As soon as each day dawns, the stallions scatter through the forest, but Masha uses the pipe to herd them back, by summoning bees (on the first day), wasps (on the second day) and strands of wool (on the third day) that sting the horses to draw them back to Masha's position. For this, Yaga Yagishina rewards Masha with a gilded plate with earrings and three golden apples, and points Masha to a crystal palace in a clearing where the sorceress that cursed Fetist lives, and Masha is to use the objects to trade for three nights with Fetist. Yaga Yagshina also gives her a ball for her to Masha to throw and follow to reach the sorceress's palace. The girl does and reaches the crystal palace, where Fetist is, and notices her iron equipments are worn down. Following Yaga Yagshina's advice, Masha takes out the golden objects and bribes the sorceress for an hour with Fetist each night (the earring for the first; the golden apples for the second, and the golden plate for the third). However, Fetist lies asleep for the whole of three nights, since the sorceress gave him a sleeping potion. On the third night, however, Masha's tears fall on Fetist's cheek and touches his heart, managing to awake him. Fetist opens his eyes and recognizes his bride Masha, then dismisses the sorceress. At last, the couple returns to their homeland and marry in a grand feast.

===== Feni-Falcon (Nekrasov Cossacks) =====
Folklorist F. V. Tumilevich collected a variant of the story from the Nekrasov Cossacks with the title "Фени-Сокол" ("Feni-Falcon"). In this tale, a hunter lives with his wife and three daughters. One day, when the girls are old enough, the man announces he will go to the "panair" to sell some animal furs, and asks the girls which presents he can bring back: the elder asks for a silken summer dress, the middle one for some silken shirts, and the youngest, named Masha, for the feather of Feni-Falcon. The man goes to the bazaar, sells the furs and buys the garments for his elder daughters, but cannot find Feni's feather. On the way back, a man approaches the hunter and offers him the feather. The hunter goes back home and gives the gifts to his three daughters. Masha summons Feni by using the feather, and they have secret encounters. One day, Feni tells Masha he will appear by midnight. Her sisters learn of the meeting and place needles by the window. Feni fly in and hurts himself in the trap, then tells Masha to find him beyond nine kingdoms, in the hut of an old woman Proskunchikha, then departs. Masha prepares herself for the journey, asking her father to make three staves and three pairs of shoes, and for her mother to bake three loaves of bread. She ventures into the forest and meets three very old Baba Yagas in their huts on the way to old woman Proskunchikha. After a long search, Masha reaches the hut of old woman Proskunchikha, who tells her Feni has married a witch woman named Baba Yaga, and gives her golden objects (including a golden comb and a golden saucer with an egg) to trade for three nights with Feni, one object before each night. The witch woman is alerted of Masha's presence by her servants, and agrees to a deal. Masha enters Feni's bedroom and tries to wake him up, to no avail, since Baba Yaga has given him a soporific drink. On the third and final night, Feni wakes up and spends the night with Masha. The next day, Masha tries to leave, but Feni says she should not worry, ties Baba Yaga to a horse and releases the animal into the wilderness, taking the witch woman with it. Feni and Masha are then married. According to Tumilevich's notes, the tale is "popular" ('популярна', in the original) among the Nekrasov Cossacks.

===== The Feather of Bright Falcon Fiofis =====
In a Russian tale collected from a Russian Siberian source with the title "Фиофисного ясного сокола перышко" ("The Feather of Bright Falcon Fiofis"), a tsar has three daughters, one of them lives alone. Her two sisters pay her a visit and question themselves how their sister managed to get a feather of the Bright Falcon Fiofis, and how they meet. One night, the girl sees her sisters off and goes to wait for Fiofis. The falcon flies in to her window, but gets entangled in her window, asking the girl, called Marfita-tsarevna (Princess Marfita), to come find him in the tenth kingdom. Marfita goes after Fiofis and finds a yurt spinning on legs, which she commands to stop. Marfita enters the yurt and asks its denizen, an old woman, if she saw Fiofis. She says no, and Marfita continues on her journey. She reaches another spinning yurt, then asks another old woman if she saw the Falcon Fiofis. The old woman says that the self-playing gusli is playing in Marfita's honour, and hides her in a chest. Soon enough, Falcon Fiofis flies in the yurt, and self-playing gusli plays the notes. The old woman takes out Marfita from the chest and the couple reunite. They take the old woman and her mother, and everyone rides back home. The tale was collected in 1946 from a sixty-four-year-old informant named P. Ya. Portnyagin, by N. M. Alekseev.

===== Other tales =====
Russian scholars A. P. Razumova and G. I Senkina reported another tale from a Karelian Pomor: a father brings his daughter the feather of Pilvist; Pilvist, as a falcon, enters the heroine's window and becomes a prince; her sisters place blades by the window and hurt him. The heroine goes after him to cure him. In another tale, collected in Vodlozero with the title "Филипп ясный сокол" ("Filipp Bright Falcon"), Filipp falls under the power of Baba-Yaga, but his wife, with the help of a good witch, rescues him.

=== Perm ===
In a tale from Perm Krai with the title "Фифилисто ясно перышко" ("Fifilist, Bright Feather"), a father wants to gift his three daughters presents, and the youngest asks for Fifilist Bright Feather. The man does not seem to find the object on the first two trips, only on the third. After the girl gets Fifilist Bright Feather, she summons him by her window with a song and he comes to give her beautiful dresses to go to church with. The girl goes to church twice and is not recognized by her sisters, but on the third time she tells them she was the girl in beautiful dresses. On the fourth time, the sister place scissors by the window, Fifilist is hurt by the blades and flies back to wherever he comes from. The girl decides to go after him and meets Baba Yaga in her hut. Baba Yaga gives the heroine three eggs and three bowls, one of copper on the first time, silver on the second and gold on the third, and advises her to trade them for three nights with Fifilist, who is living with Baba Yaga's daughters.

Russian linguist Dmitry Zelenin published a tale from Perm Gubernia with the title "Сказка о Дуньке-дурке и Ясном Соколе" ("The Tale of Dunka-Durka and the Bright Falcon"). In this tale, an old man and an old woman live with their three daughters, the youngest, Dunka, called a fool by the elder two. One day, their father goes to the market and asks his daughters what he can buy them: the elder asks for a ribbon, the middle one for a handkerchief, and Dunka for Bright Falcon. The man gets a feather of Bright Falcon to Dunka. One day, the Bright Falcon flies in to Dunka's room and gives her beautiful dresses she wears to go to church. Eventually, Dunka's sisters discover the Bright Falcon's clandestine visits to their sister, and place knives on the windowsill. The next time the bird comes in, he pricks his body on the blades and injures himself, then flies back whence he came. When Dunka enters her room, she sees the blood on the window and decides to go after him. Dunka passes by the huts of three Baba Yagas: the first Baba Yaga tells the girl how the Bright Falcon married the granddaughter of the third Baba Yaga; the second gives the girl a golden preshenka (spinning wheel), a silver spindle and a golden pail and jug, and advises her to use the objects to trade for three nights with the third Baba Yaga's granddaughter. Dunka fails on the first two nights, but manages on the third one; the Bright Falcon wakes up and escapes with the girl from Baba Yaga's granddaughter's clutches.

=== Karelia ===
In a Russian-language tale from Vodlozero with the title "Марья-запечница" ("Marya-Zapechnitsa"), a merchant has three daughters, Anna, Tanya and Marya-Zapechnitsa, who sits by the stove. One day, he is ready to go on a business trip, and asks his daughters what gifts he can bring them: the elder asks for silk, the middle one for cashmere, and Marya asks for Philist, the Bright Falcon. The merchant brings home their presents. Some time later, Marya's sisters go to church on a Sunday, but she stays home. After they leave, Philist gives Marya fine clothes for her to go to church. Marya goes and her sisters do not recognize her. On the third Sunday, Marya goes to church and forgets her ring there, which her sisters recognize as belonging to her. Anna and Tanya take Philist away from her and the bird flies away. Marya then decides to look for him. She wanders off until she reaches a hut on chicken legs and meets its owner, an old woman. The woman gives her a golden spindle and a spinning wheel, and tells her to seek a nearby old lady named Egibaba with her two daughters, and trade the objects for one night with Philist. Marya trades the spindle with Egibaba's daughters, enters Philist's room and tries to wake him up, to no avail, since he was given a soporific wine. The next night, she trades the spinning wheel and manages to wake him up.

=== Bulgaria ===
Variants of type 432 also exist in the Bulgarian Folktale Catalogue with the name Сокол съпруг ("Falcon husband"), which reference Finist as the bird prince.

== Adaptations ==
=== Film ===
- Finist, the brave Falcon (Финист - Ясный сокол) (1976), Soviet Slavic fantasy adventure film directed by Gennadi Vasilyev.
- The Falcon (1990), children's film written and co-directed by Greg Palmer. The first co-production between the US and Soviet Georgia, with a film crew from Seattle shooting alongside locals in the Caucasus Mountains. It was aired on television as part of the 1990 Goodwill Games.
- The Phoenix Feather Alexandre Alexeieff and Claire Parker, (1974) animation on pinboard with chiaroscuro effect, 12 minutes, Black and White, part of European Folk Tales series produced by Max Massimino Garnier and John Halas for the International Animated Film Association 1971-1980, shown on Granada TV in UK and worldwide in 1980s.
- Finist, the Brave Falcon (2020, theatrical play) Svetlana Petriychuk <https://www.washingtonpost.com/world/2024/07/08/playwright-director-sentenced-russia-extremism/>
- Finist. First Knight (2025) upcoming Russian remake film

=== Literature ===
- Josepha Sherman drew on this fairy tale for her novel The Shining Falcon.
- Andrei Platonov adapted the tale as Finist the Falcon Prince.
- James Riordan retold the tale as Fenist the Falcon.

== See also ==
- Beauty and the Beast
- Black Bull of Norroway
- East of the Sun and West of the Moon
- The Canary Prince
- The Enchanted Pig
- The Falcon Pipiristi
- The Scarlet Flower
- The Singing, Springing Lark
- The Three Sisters
- The Two Kings' Children
- The White Bird and His Wife
