= Granddaughter of Ice =

- Russian: Ледяная внучка
- Directed by: Boris Rytsarev
- Written by: Boris Rytsarev
- Starring: Svetlana Orlova; Andrey Gradov; Lyudmila Shagalova; Boris Saburov; Albert Filozov
- Cinematography: Andrei Kirillov
- Edited by: Lyudmila Drozdova
- Release date: 1980
- Running time: 73 minute
- Country: Soviet Union
- Language: Russian

Granddaughter of Ice (Russian: Ледяная внучка) is a 1980 Soviet fantasy film directed by Boris Rytsarev.

== Plot ==
The film tells about the Snow Maiden, who falls in love with a country potter so much that she wants to become an ordinary girl and marry him. But it was not so simple.

== Cast ==
- Svetlana Orlova
- Andrey Gradov
- Lyudmila Shagalova
- Boris Saburov
- Albert Filozov
- Valeriy Dolzhenkov as Timoschka
- Olga Grigoreva as Nastassya
- Vladimir Nikitin as Brautwerber
- Vladimir Druzhnikov
