= Ivan and Marya =

- Russian: Иван да Марья
- Directed by: Boris Rytsarev
- Written by: Aleksandr Khmelik
- Starring: Ivan Bortnik; Tatyana Livanova; Ivan Ryzhov; Liya Akhedzhakova; Yelizaveta Uvarova
- Cinematography: Aleksei Chardynin
- Edited by: W. Issajeva
- Music by: Aleksandr Chaykovskiy
- Release date: 1974
- Country: Soviet Union
- Language: Russian

Ivan and Marya (Russian: Иван да Марья) is a 1974 Soviet musical fantasy comedy film directed by Boris Rytsarev.

== Plot ==
The film takes place on the Black Sea in a pioneer camp. Suddenly the pioneer horn disappears and all the pioneers go in search of it, during which they quarrel, make peace and experience various adventures.

== Cast ==
- Ivan Bortnik as Ivan
- Tatyana Livanova as Marya (as Tatyana Piskunova)
- Ivan Ryzhov as Tsar
- Liya Akhedzhakova as Princess Agrafina
- Yelizaveta Uvarova
- Nikolay Burlyaev
- Valentin Nikulin as Ghost Timosha
- Lev Kruglyy
- Viktor Sergachyov
- Mikhail Kozakov
