= Zinaida Vorkul =

Soviet actress (1909–1994)

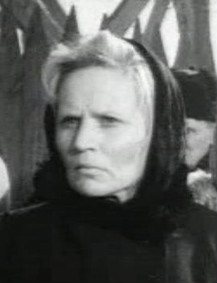
- Born: Zinaida Venediktovna Vorkul; 2 May 1909; St. Petersburg, Russian Empire
- Died: 15 December 1994 (aged 85); Moscow, Russian Federation
- Occupation: Actor
- Years active: 1941–1992

Zinaida Venediktovna Vorkul (Russian: Зинаи́да Венеди́ктовна Ворку́ль) (2 May 1909 – 15 December 1994) was a Soviet stage and film actress. She is known for playing character roles, usually as a mother or grandmother.

== Selected filmography ==
- 1948 — The Young Guard as Osmukhin's mother
- 1957 — Gutta-percha Boy as laundress
- 1964 — Jack Frost as Ivan's mother
- 1964 — The Chairman as episode
- 1966 — Andrei Rublev as Mary, the wanderer
- 1967 — Fire, Water, and Brass Pipes as Witch
- 1969 — Funny Magic as episode
- 1973 — Seventeen Moments of Spring as Nurse in the shelter
- 1981 — Carnival as Zinaida, Solomatin's mother
- 1983 — Eternal Call as Markovna
- 1990 — Cloud-Paradise as old woman
