= Yeralash =

Russian children's comedy television show

- Title card
- Genre: Children's sketch comedy
- Created by: Alexander Khmelik; Boris Grachevsky; Alla Surikova; Alexei Rybnikov
- Theme music composer: Alexei Rybnikov
- Opening theme: "Boys and girls, as well as their parents..."
- Ending theme: "Param-param-pam-pam, param-param-pam-pam, param-param-pam-pam-pam! In the magazine "Yeralash!"" (then a minus sign)
- Country of origin: Soviet Union→Russia
- Original language: Russian
- No. of episodes: 417

Production
- Production companies: Gorky Film Studio (1974-1995); Yeralash Land (1996-2005); Yeralash Studio (2005-present)

Original release
- Release: 1974 – present

Yeralash (Russian: Ералаш, IPA: [jɪrɐˈlaʂ]) is a Soviet and Russian children's comedy television show and magazine. Yeralash also runs an actor studio and the "Yeralash Island" camp. The word yeralash means "mixed, mishmash" or "jumble" and is taken from the Turkic languages.

== History ==
In 1974, Directors Alla Surikova, Alexander Khmelik and Boris Grachevsky sent a letter to the Central Committee of the Communist Party of the Soviet Union with a proposal to create a comedy newsreel “Fitilek” (Little Wick) for children (similar to the name of another newsreel Fitil, which was aimed for adult audience). In the process of development, the name "Fitilek" was rejected. The most widespread story about how the new name was chosen is that a contest was announced among the audience to rename the film magazine, and the name "Yeralash" was taken from a letter from a certain schoolgirl. Subsequently, this letter was said to have been lost. However, in 2013, Surikova and Grachevsky finally told that the name was coined by Khmelik 's daughter. Additionally, the name "Yeralash" itself is a consonant away from the surname of Philip Ermash, the chairman of the State Committee for Cinematography (Goskino) from 1972 to 1986, though the creators maintain that this was not intentional.

Initially, the show was formally shown in all theatres across the USSR prior to its run, and moved to television in 1991.

In 1986, on the 10th anniversary of the programme, Grachevsky, with Julius Gusman as co-author, wrote a musical television film concert entitled “What is Yeralash?” The film consisted of cuts of the best plots, as well as pop, concert and circus performances, and parodies of famous singers in those years. The film was attended by actors, its creators, some actors who most often starred in it, as well as famous singers and comedians (Vladimir Vinokur, Gennady Khazanov, among others).

In 1995, on the 20th anniversary of their show, a special concert was organized and a 2-hour television version with cuts of the best plots was created, in 1999 on the 25th anniversary followed another runs itself in 2000 and in 2004.

Since its debut, over 1000 episodes have been produced. A typical episode consists of two to six unrelated comedy scenes.

Yeralash has traditionally been filmed in Sukko near Anapa. The show featured numerous notable present-day Russian celebrities such as singer Yulia Volkova from duo t.A.T.u., singer Vlad Topalov and singer Glukoza.

On September 25, 2016, Boris Grachevsky announced that Yeralash would stop production after season 32 (and there would be no season 33) and that it would be closed on December 20 of the same year.

The show was nominated for a TEFI award in 2003.

In 2023, a clip from the 182nd episode went viral. There, an English teacher (portrayed by Irina Domninskaya) frequently asks her students, "Do you speak English?"

== List of episodes (incomplete) ==
- №001 (1974) – A shameful stain, Well, why do we say that???, Smoke, smoke, smoke!
- №002 (1974) - The Glory of Ivan Kozlovsky, Hospitality, No need to worry
- №003 (1975) – An interesting book, Dark business, English lesson
- №010 (1976) – Dreams, Area of Africa, Love story
- №019 (1978) – Sports, sports, sports... or Uncle Misha's advice, Daddy, Mommy, me – a tight-knit family, Sycophant
- №034 (1982) – Such a pity, birthday party..., In the world of chess, Who's next?
- №054 (1986) – Intonation, Please be seated, Contact
- №077 (1989) – Special inspection, Urchin, An intriguer
- №080 (1990) – A night, a street, a lamp..., Who said "woof"?, King Kong lives!
- №082 (1990) – Scream, Duel, Patriot
- №120 (1997) - Best friend, Dog's live, PE Hurray
- №182 (2005) – Do you Speak English?, Why?, Chronometers
- №193 (2006) – Funny joke, First victory, Be a Human!
- №200 (2006) – Life experience, Hot Potato, Terminator

Full library in the official Yeralash website (in Russian): https://eralash.ru/library

== Theme music ==
The Opening theme itself was taken from a melody composed for the lyrics of a poem written by Vladimir Shainsky, but he omitted most of the words. Therefore, the choice was later made in favor of a melody written by Alexei Rybnikov using only the synthesizer. It was performed by Elena Kamburova from 1974 to 1996 and later by 10 year old Sergey Lazarev and the group ensemble "Neposedy'" from 1997.

== Magazine ==
Yeralash also produces a children's comedy magazine; twelve issues had been published by October 2009. The magazines featured anecdotes and humorous stories. Each magazine consists of seven to thirteen articles. It is published by the Drofa publishing house.
