= The Princess on a Pea =

- Russian: Принцесса на горошине
- Directed by: Boris Rytsarev
- Written by: Hans Christian Andersen; Feliks Mironer
- Starring: Andrey Podoshian; Irina Malysheva; Innokentiy Smoktunovsky; Alisa Freindlikh; Irina Yurevich
- Cinematography: Aleksandr Machilsky; Vyacheslav Yegorov
- Edited by: Nina Vasilyeva
- Music by: Antonio Vivaldi
- Production company: Gorky Film Studio
- Release date: 1977
- Running time: 89 min.
- Country: Soviet Union
- Language: Russian

The Princess on a Pea (Russian: Принцесса на горошине, romanized: Printsessa na goroshine) is a 1977 Soviet children's fantasy film directed by Boris Rytsarev.

== Plot ==
Based on the tales of Hans Christian Andersen. When the time came for the prince to get married, an announcement appeared on the gate of the palace: A princess is required. But the prince did not wait for the visit and set off in search of himself. Going around a great many lands, the prince returned home, where he soon found the one he was dreaming of.

== Cast ==
- Irina Malysheva as the Princess on a Pea
- Andrey Podoshian as Prince (as Andrey Podoshyan)
- Irina Yurevich First Princess
- Innokenty Smoktunovsky as King
- Alisa Freindlikh as Queen
- Marina Livanova Second Princess
- Yuri Chekulayev as First King
- Aleksandr Kalyagin as Second King
- Vasiliy Kupriyanov as Swineherd
- Igor Kvasha as Troll
- Svetlana Orlova as Third Princess
- Viktor Sergachyov as Herald
- Irina Murzaeva as marquise
- Yevgeny Steblov as poet
- Vladimir Zeldin as Chief Hofmeister

== Awards ==
- Special jury prize of the X All-Union Film Festival in Riga for creative efforts in the development of the fairy tale genre (Boris Rytsarev)
