= The Greenish Bird =

Mexican fairy tale

"The Greenish Bird" is a Mexican fairy tale collected by Joel Gomez in La Encantada, Texas from a seventy-four-year-old woman, Mrs. P.E.

It combines Aarne–Thompson types 425, "The Search for the Lost Husband", and 432, the Prince as Bird. Other types of the first type include The Black Bull of Norroway, The Brown Bear of Norway, East of the Sun and West of the Moon, The Enchanted Pig, The Tale of the Hoodie, Master Semolina, The Enchanted Snake, The Sprig of Rosemary, The Daughter of the Skies, and White-Bear-King-Valemon. Others of the second include The Feather of Finist the Falcon, The Green Knight, and The Blue Bird.

== Synopsis ==
Of three sisters only Luisa sewed; her sisters hung out in bars instead. A greenish bird that was a prince came and wooed her. Her sisters found out and put knives in the window so he was wounded. He told her to that he lived in crystal towers on the plains of Merlin.

She bought herself iron shoes and set out. She finds the Sun's house, where his mother warns her that he will eat her; she nevertheless hides until the mother calms her son down, whereupon he does not know the way but sends her to the Moon. The same thing happens with the Moon, and then with the Wind, but the Wind can not send her anywhere. She happens on a hermit who can summon all the birds and animals, and an old eagle says that the Greenish Bird is to marry, except that he is very ill, and if she kills him a cow, he could take her. When they flew, he asked for meat, and she gave him another leg. When she was out, she offered to cut off her own leg, but the eagle said he was testing her.

At the prince's, she worked in the kitchen and played the guitar. This cured the prince. The prince then said every woman must make a cup of cocoa, and whoever's he drank, he would marry the woman. He drank Luisa's, not caring whether it was bitter, and married her.

== Sources ==
The informant learned it from her mother, who was famed for her guitar playing, which may explain that motif.

== Analysis ==
=== Tale type ===
The tale is classified, in the international Aarne-Thompson-Uther Index, as tale type ATU 432, "The Prince as Bird", and 425, "The Search for the Lost Husband".

=== Motifs ===
The episode of the journey on the eagle's back is parallel to similar events in many fairy tales, where a hero needs to feed pieces of meat to the eagle for the remainder of the journey, otherwise it will not complete its flight. In this regard, folklorist scholarship recognizes its similarities with the tale of Etana helping an eagle, a tale type later classified as Aarne–Thompson–Uther ATU 537, "The Eagle as helper: hero carried on the wings of a helpful eagle".

=== Sayings ===
The tale explained that a person who asks for meat is an "old eagle" because the eagle asked for meat while flying.

== Variants ==
=== Central America ===
According to professor Fernando Peñalosa, type 432 is known in Mayan sources as 432, El príncipe de pájaro or The Prince as Bird: a prince turns into a hummingbird, flies to a girl's window and both elope.

=== Ecuador ===
In an Ecuadorian tale titled La Princesa La Cara de la Necesidad, a prince throws a pebble at an old woman and breaks a jar she was carrying. The old woman says the prince did it because he does not know the titular princess "La Cara de La Necesidad", and shows him her picture. The prince decides to go in search of this princess. He goes to the shore, embarks on a ship and sails to the princess's kingdom. He puts on a suit and a pair of shoes, and disembarks. Some soldiers say the prince killed their prince, and arrest him. In the dungeons, another prisoner tells the prince the princess La Cara de La Necesidad brings food for the inmates. The princess learns the prince is innocent and goes to talk to her father. The king summons the prince in front of the populace, who shout for him to be executed. The prince proves his identity, and is banished from the kingdom back to his homeland. He eventually loses his mind, and is locked in a high tower. Meanwhile, the princess La Cara de La Necesidad, longing for the prince, decides to go after him. She passes by a red house that belongs to the Sun and his mother (where she gains a magical tablecloth), a white house that belongs to the moon and his mother (where she gains a chicken that hatchen golden chicks) and the house of the Wind and his mother. The Wind agrees to take the princess to "las torres altas y calladas del rey turco" (the prince's location), and changes her to a wrinkled and lame old woman in shabby clothes. The princess arrives at prince Gustavo's castle, and, saying her name is Cipriana, finds work as a chicken herd. In the chicken coop, the princess takes out the hen, the magic tablecloth and a magical comb (that the Wind gave her), and bribes the queen for three nights with the prince, so that her presence may cure him. For the first two nights, the prince is fast asleep due to his medicine, but sees the princess on the third night and regains his sanity. They then marry and live happily.

=== Uruguay ===
In an Uruguayan tale translated as The Green Moss Prince, an orphan girl named Florinda lives and works alone, and becomes friends with a widow and her three daughters that live in the same town. One day, while the girls are at Florinda's house, they notice some jewels in a corner of the room, and decide to spy on Florinda to discover their origin. The elder daughter pays Florinda a visit, drinks some tea, and sleeps, failing in her duty. The same happens to the widow's middle daughter. The third daughter, who is one-eyed, offers to spy on the girl and report to their mother. She spills the drink and pretends to be asleep, watching a whole scene unfold before her single eye: Florinda grooms herself in the mirror; a parrot knocks on the window and the girl lets it in; the bird drops on a basin and becomes a prince; the pair spends the night together and the prince turns back into a bird by morning. The one-eyed girl tells her mother about the secret meeting and they conspire to put some broken glass and razor on Florinda's window. The next night the parrot flies in, he hurts himself in the glass and, thinking Florinda somehow betrayed him, tells her to look for him in the Kingdom of the Green Moss by wearing down three pairs of iron shoes. Florinda decides to look for the parrot prince and begins her quest to locate the Green Moss Prince, passing by the house of the Wind and his mother, the Moon and his mother, and the Sun and his mother, who all give her gifts that will become useful for her. At the Sun's house, she discovers the prince is to be married in three days' time. The next day, the Sun takes her to the Kingdom of the Green Moss, all decorated with banners and flags, and she takes out a golden spinning wheel on the first day, a golden lace cushion on the second, and finally a golden hen and six golden chicks on the third, which she trades for the local princess for one night with the Green Moss Prince, one item for each night. On the first two nights, Florinda enters the prince's adjoining room and pours out her woes for him to hear, to no avail. In the morning of the third day, the prince's chamberlain mentions she should not wake the prince, for he sleeps, and Florinda asks the chamberlain to avoid giving the potion to the prince later that same night. Florinda's plea is heard, and the Green Moss Prince does not drink the sleeping potion, and begins to hear Florinda's wail through the wall. With his chamberlain's help, the Green Moss Prince goes to meet Florinda and they reconcile. He dismisses the other bride and marries Florinda.
