= Henchman =

Supporter of a villain engaging in criminal activity

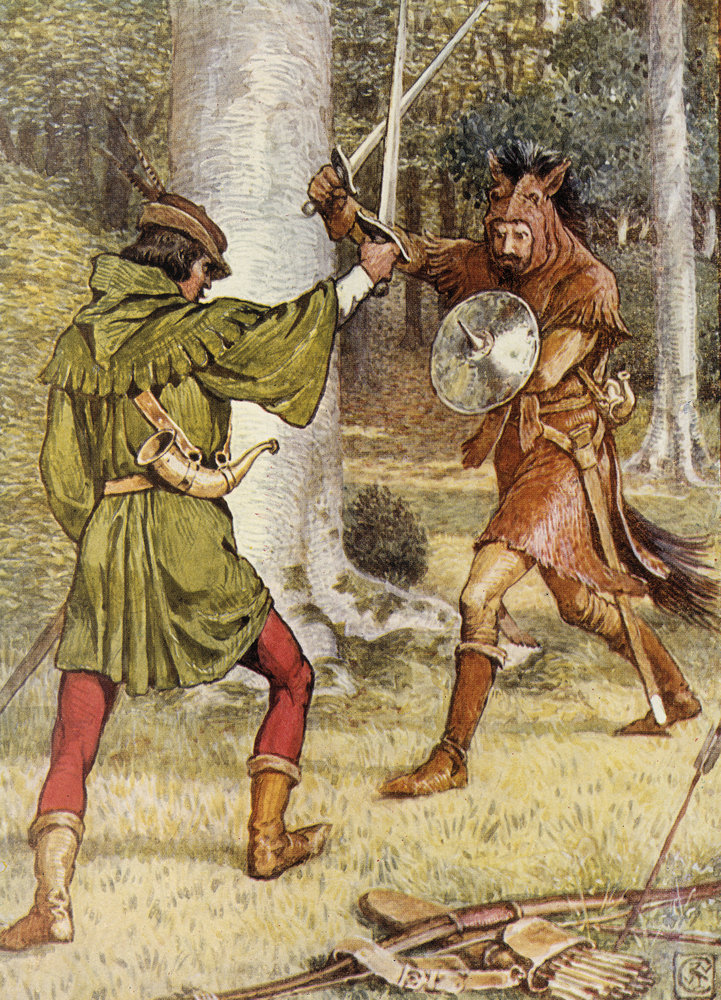
1912 illustration of Guy of Gisbourne (right) dueling with Robin Hood; Guy is a henchman of the Sheriff of Nottingham

A henchman is a loyal employee, supporter, or aide to some powerful figure engaged in nefarious or criminal enterprises. Henchmen are typically relatively unimportant in the organisation: minions whose value lies primarily in their unquestioning loyalty to their leader. The term henchman is often used derisively, or even comically, to refer to individuals of low status who lack any moral compass of their own.

The term henchman originally referred to one who attended a horse for their employer, that is, a horse groom. Hence, like constable and marshal, also originally stable staff, henchman became the title of a subordinate official in a royal court or noble household.

== Etymology ==
The first part of the word, which has been in usage since at least the Middle Ages, comes from the Old English hengest, meaning "horse", notably stallion, cognates of which also occur in many Germanic languages, such as Old Frisian, Danish hingst, German, Dutch hengst and Afrikaans hings [həŋs]. The word appears in the name of Hengest, the Saxon chieftain, and still survives in English in place-names and other names beginning with Hingst- or Hinx-. It was often rendered as Henxman in medieval English.

Young henchmen, in fact pages of honour or squires, rode or walked at the side of their master in processions and the like, and appear in the English royal household from the 14th century until Tudor Queen Elizabeth I abolished the royal henchmen, known also as the children of honour. Six or more 'henxmen' are listed in the Black Book of the Household of Edward IV, along with a Master, who was to teach them to ride 'cleanly and surely', to bring them to jousts, to show them how to wear their armour, and to instruct them in sundry languages and other 'learnings virtuous'.

The word became obsolete for grooms in English from the middle of the 17th century, but was retained in Scots as "personal attendant of a Highland chief". It was revived in English by way of the novelist Sir Walter Scott, who took the word and its derivation, according to the New English Dictionary, from Edward Burt's Letters from a Gentleman in the North of Scotland, together with its erroneous derivation from haunch. The word is, in this sense, synonymous with gillie, the faithful personal follower of a Highland chieftain, the man who stands at his master's haunch, ready for any emergency.

The modern sense of "obedient or unscrupulous follower" is first recorded 1839, probably based on a misunderstanding of the word as used by Scott, and is often used to describe an out-and-out adherent or partisan, ready to do anything.

== Modern examples ==
The phrase henchman is also used as a pejorative for the subordinates of any sort of political mastermind or to present others as such. Thus it was used for associates of President George W. Bush, e.g., by Venezuelan President Hugo Chávez. Likewise, it was also used against associates of the former U.S. president Bill Clinton. Rebekah Brooks has been described as the henchwoman of Rupert Murdoch.

Members of the SS, or any of Adolf Hitler's staff, are often called "Hitler's Henchmen", a phrase used as the title of a book by Guido Knopp and a television documentary.

== Fictional examples ==
Henchmen have been depicted in various capacities across genres of fiction, whether as low-level functionaries or capable lieutenants of major characters. Notable examples include henchmen such as Oddjob from the James Bond franchise, who was also parodied by "Random Task" in the Austin Powers comedy film. In animation, Starscream is generally depicted as the second-in-command to the main antagonist Megatron, while more literal depictions of a henchman can be seen in the animated series The Venture Bros. This includes the secondary characters Henchman 21 and 24, among other characters seen in service to the supervillains in the series.

== See also ==
- Flying monkey
- Hitman
- Igor (character)
- Nodwick
- Sidekick
- Sycophant

== Bibliography ==
- EtymologyOnLine
