= The Christians (film) =

- Russian: Христиане
- Directed by: Dmitriy Zolotukhin
- Written by: Leonid Andreyev; Pavel Lungin
- Starring: Lyubov Polishchuk; Lev Zolotukhin; Nikolai Pastukhov; Leonid Monastyrsky; Vladimir Ivashov
- Cinematography: Lev Rogozin
- Release date: 1987
- Running time: 48 minute
- Country: Soviet Union
- Language: Russian

The Christians (Russian: Христиане) is a 1987 Soviet drama film directed by Dmitriy Zolotukhin.

The film is about a woman named Pelageya Karaulova who refuses to take the oath before the cross, explaining that she is not a Christian.

== Plot ==
In court, a trial concerning embezzlement is underway. Before the session begins, witnesses are routinely questioned about their readiness to take an oath. Unexpectedly, one of the attendees, Pelageya Karaulova, refuses to swear in, citing her work as a prostitute.

The judge, a priest, the prosecutor, the defense attorney, and even the jurors each attempt to persuade Pelageya with various arguments, but she remains firm. Additionally, she shares candid details about her life, including the profane and shocking realities of life in a brothel. Ultimately, the court decides to allow her to testify without taking an oath.

== Cast ==
- Lyubov Polishchuk
- Lev Zolotukhin
- Nikolai Pastukhov
- Leonid Monastyrsky
- Vladimir Ivashov
- Svetlana Orlova
- Sergey Taramaev
- Svetlana Ryabova
- Vladimir Sergachyov
- Anatoliy Obukhov
