= Finist, the Brave Falcon =

- Directed by: Gennadi Vasilyev
- Written by: Lev Potyomkin; Aleksandr Rou; Mikhail Nozhkin
- Starring: Vyacheslav Voskresensky; Svetlana Orlova; Mikhail Kononov; Mikhail Pugovkin; Lyudmila Khityayeva
- Cinematography: Yuri Malinovsky; Vladimir Okunev
- Music by: Vladimir Shainsky
- Production company: Gorky Film Studio
- Release date: 1976
- Running time: 75 minutes
- Country: Soviet Union
- Language: Russian

Finist, the Brave Falcon (Russian: Финист - Ясный сокол, romanized: Finist – Yasnyy sokol) is a Soviet 1976 Russian fantasy adventure film directed by Gennadi Vasilyev in his directorial debut, based on a screenplay by Lev Potyomkin and poems by Mikhail Nozhkin. Produced by Gorky Film Studio (Yalta branch).

The film was loosely based on the fairy-tale The Feather of Finist the Falcon with the same name by I. Shestakov. Finist, the Brave Falcon was the final project of the famous fantasy film director Alexander Rou, who wrote the script and was going to direct it, but died before the production begun. The movie, which was dedicated to his memory, was completed by Vasilyev after Rou's death.

== Plot ==
In ancient times a simple plowman lives in Russia by the name of Finist who is friends with a falcon. The falcon warns Finist about enemies who want to capture Russia. Finist successfully chases the foreign invaders away. The other side is unhappy with the emergence of a bogatyr-defender in Russia. Their chief, sorcerer Kartaus-Red Mustache sends his henchman Kastryuk the werewolf to get rid of the hero. Using deception he lures Finist into a dungeon where he enchants him and turns him into a monster.

At the Russian outpost a voivode with druzhina prepare to repel raiding enemies. For this purpose city clerk Yashku is sent to search for Finist. During his journey, Yashka meets Finist's bride Alyonushka. As they go along the road together to find Finist, they meet peasant Agathon and his wife Anfisa, who at that were about to go to the fair, but fearing a monster's roar were forced to stay in the forest. Suddenly an old woman appears, Neninla, who proclaims that it is possible to make a wish on a fern and that it would be fulfilled this night. Also, the old woman says that the monster is a bewitched person and the curse will be undone if under a monster's guise he will be loved by a fair maiden. In a debate about what kind of a wish to make, Anfisa heatedly tells Agathon to "disappear off the face of the earth". Blaming Yashka for this, the next day she returns him to the outpost demanding the return of Agathon and Alyonushka follows them.

Meanwhile, Kartaus sends Kastryuk to the frontier, so that he disguised as a merchant gets inside and opens the gates to the enemies of the war-leader. But Kastryuk is uncovered by jocular old women and he is pushed into the pantry together with shrewish Anfisa.

Soon Kartaus sends his servants to capture the outpost. But this time the monster gets through by a breach to the outpost. Alyonushka, knowing that this monster is Finist, covers him with a red cloak which she wanted to gift him. The curse is coming off and Finist becomes a man again. Together with druzhina he drives away his enemies.

Sitting in a pantry, Kastryuk attempts to persuade Anfisa to help him fulfill his nefarious plans, giving her a magic comb to send the hero to sleep. Anfisa untangles Kastryuk's hands and sticks a comb into Finist's hair. Kastryuk transports Anfisa and sleeping Finist to Kartaus' den.

Again Alyonushka goes to rescue the bogatyr, and Voevoda sends Yashka to protect her. With the help of jocular old women who miraculously appear in Kartaus' den, Alyonushka and Yashka free Finist. Finist sends them home and he deals with Kartaus.

== Cast ==
- Vyacheslav Voskresensky as Finist
- Svetlana Orlova as Alyonushka
- Mikhail Kononov as Yashka
- Mikhail Pugovkin as Voyevoda
- Lyudmila Khityaeva as Anfisa
- Georgi Vitsin as Agafon
- Mariya Barabanova as Nenila
- Glikeriya Bogdanova-Chesnokova as Veselushka
- Anna Stroganova as Veselushka
- Aleksei Smirnov as Bath-attendant
- Mark Pertsovsky as Kartaus
- Georgi Millyar as Kastryuk / Baba Yaga (cameo appearance)
- Lev Potyomkin as Fingal
