= Nodwick =

Comic strip by Aaron Williams

- Cover art for Nodwick Chronicles V Tour of Doodie.
- Author: Aaron Williams
- Website: comic.nodwick.com
- Launch date: April 1998 First strip
- Genre(s): Fantasy, role-playing game, comedy

Nodwick is a comic strip created by Aaron Williams, based around the conventions of fantasy role-playing games, in particular Dungeons & Dragons (D&D). It debuted in Dragon magazine issue No. 246 (April 1998), first with short strips, and later receiving a second strip in Dungeon magazine, making fun of one of the adventures published in each issue. In Dragon No. 270 (April 2000), Nodwick was expanded to a two-page spread and replaced Knights of the Dinner Table as a full-page comic that served as a parody of D&D adventuring. It later became a single page strip, related to the issue's theme; later, the strip was removed from Dungeon, but still appeared in Dragon, now unrelated to the main theme of the issue, until Dragon ceased print publication late in 2007.

The titular character, Nodwick, is a henchman (as opposed to a hireling) in the employ of a typical D&D-style adventuring party. Nodwick is published in Dragon magazine and on Nodwick.com, along with a "sibling" comic, Full Frontal Nerdity. Nodwick and the adventurers he works with were given statistics for the 2nd edition Advanced Dungeons & Dragons (AD&D) rules as part of the Giants in the Earth article in Dragon No. 270. A Nodwick card game is also available.

A bi-monthly comic book was published by the author, which ran for 36 issues before its cancellation. The strip has since become a back-up strip in Nodwick's more popular sister title PS238, although collections of the comic book are available as trade paperbacks.

A "reinvented" version of Nodwick and his adventuring group have also appeared in a City of Heroes based comic strip as the superhero team "Q-4orce."

== Main characters ==
Nodwick

A short henchman, Nodwick has served the adventurers for many years. As the artist's style evolved, Nodwick grew shorter and his nose grew larger; this was actually commented upon in the comics themselves, with Artax trying to understand how it happened and Nodwick suggesting his nose grew to create balance for the oft-ridiculous weights he is forced to carry (generally orders of magnitude greater than his own weight). As most of the other henchmen in the strip look very similar to Nodwick, this seems to be a relatively common phenomenon.

Artax and Yeagar frequently use Nodwick to set off traps, or to distract or bait monsters. Nodwick has died numerous times, but each time Piffany manages to revive him with her duct tape of healing, usually wrapping him from head to toe to put him back together (On one occasion, Nodwick was reduced to a pile of ashes, so the group poured his ashes into a "Hench Mold" with the words "Just add water" written on it; about the only time she hasn't used the duct tape); so Yeagar and Artax usually don't worry about tossing him into gruesome traps, feeding him to dragons, etc., if it will advance their quests. At least one comic has mentioned that he has also been cloned several dozen times by Artax when Piffany was unavailable. Nodwick isn't as knowledgeable as Artax or as wise as Piffany, but he possesses the most common sense in the group, and is the most likely to protest their hare-brained schemes..

Over the course of his travails, Nodwick has developed a dry sense of humor and a jaded wit, and lost whatever fear of death he ever held. According to the 2nd edition character sheet for Nodwick, if he ever encounters a deity, there is a 20% chance that the deity in question recognizes him from his all-too frequent trips to the hereafter. Still, he prefers to avoid dying if he can. (The trade paperbacks include a "Rest Index Peace" at the end of each volume, listing all the ways Nodwick has died up to that volume, this Index doesn't include Nodwick's deaths from Dragon and Dungeon Magazines, nor from the online comic)..

In Dragon #270's Giants in the Earth article, Nodwick is stated as being a level 21 Henchman, with the Nonweapon Proficiences Schlepping, Toting, Hauling, and Lifting with Knees (18). He also counts as having 15 in the Religion Nonweapon Proficiency, due to his frequent deaths. His Nonweapon Proficiences are what allows Nodwick to carry such ridiculously large amounts of junk, and only apply to things designated "loot". In all other situations, Nodwick's Strength statistic is given as a mere eight. In this article, Nodwick is stated as being of Lawful Good alignment, which is why he attempts to merely find a loophole in his contract in order to escape rather than simply absconding while unattended or even murdering his employers in their sleep. It is noted that there is a base 5% chance that Nodwick may be carrying any item from the Player's Handbook, with this chance increasing by +2% for every cubic foot of junk Nodwick is hauling.

Yeagar

Buff fighter with muscles between his ears. It is often Yeagar who drags the party off on life-threatening looting runs. Yeagar's exploits frequently involve consuming large quantities of "Skull-whomper ale" and making a fool of himself and his companions. Yeager is portrayed as a proficient warrior who is nevertheless overly eager and impetuous, lacking in brainpower, and all too willing to use Nodwick as monster-bait; in one notable episode, his companions realized that Yeagar had been replaced with a doppelganger when he opted to throw a rock at a switch across a lava bed instead of throwing Nodwick at it. Noted for his chainmail body stocking and very large spiked shoulder pauldrons..

In Dragon #270's Giants in the Earth article, Yeager is described as a level 8 Chaotic Good Fighter with the special defence of a 50% resistance to attempts at reasoning and superhuman strength. His Nonweapon Proficiencies are Scheme (12), Simple Solutions For Complex Problems (15), and Running (11). Pioneer of the various abuses of henchman, he treats his Intelligence as being 18 when attempting to figure out reasons to use a henchman for something like stopping a portcullis from closing. Yeager's armor is described as being +3 chainmail, and his sword is a +1 longsword- at least, in his hands. Yeager's sword is actually a Reaper of Evil +5, +10 vs. Evil Creatures, a sentient weapon with an Intelligence and an Ego of 18 that provides its wielder with the ability to turn undead three times per day as though they were a level 15 cleric, the power to cure disease with a touch and the ability to directly contact their patron god once per year. However, the horrific experiences it suffered shortly after coming into Yeager's possession (being used to kill a skunk, scrape dragon dung off Yeager's boots and cut a path through a field of bile weeds, then fatally impaling a saintly monk after trying to leap from Yeager's possession) have left it mentally scarred and locked in a catatonic state. The only method able to cure it will be removal from Yeagar's possession and several years of therapy.

Artax

Tall, skinny wizard with a pointy green hat and an extremely long moustache. Long on intelligence, short on wisdom, and Yeagar's best friend. Artax is ostensibly the leader of the outfit, directing their efforts, but just as often Yeagar and Piffany just do as they please. Artax is not as impetuous as Yeagar and more inclined to question the advisability of his friend's scheme, but usually caves in and goes along with whatever Yeagar has in mind. Like Yeagar, he frequently uses Nodwick to set off traps, lure monsters out of their lairs, et cetera. When at home, Artax frequently uses Nodwick as a laboratory assistant (or guinea pig).

In Dragon #270's Giants in the Earth article, Artax is stated as having come from a long line of magicians. A few of his ancestors became quite famous and/or powerful, but the majority of them were lucky enough to breed before killing themselves in some spectacular magical accident. A level 7 Mage of Neutral Good alignment, Artax has Nonweapon Proficiency in Spellcraft (16), Henchcraft (18), Ancient Languages (18), Reading/Writing (19) and Forgery (15). Artax's elongated mustache is said to be infested with so many food particles that it can be ingested with all the nutritional value of a single iron ration, while his pointy hat has the powers of a +4 Ring of Protection. He is noted to have a special defense; a 30% resistance to pleas of mercy.

According to his background in this article, Artax originally adventured with a different group of adventurers- consummate professionals who were truly interested in doing good. This put them at odds with Artax, who is self-obsessed and power hungry. Yeager and Artax met when Artax's previous party was interviewing potential replacements for a slain member, a footman implicitly murdered by Artax (he was struck by lightning, while only Artax was around, in the middle of a sunny day); Artax's previous party rejected Yeagar, and that made Artax decide he was the perfect partner.

Piffany

Small, bespectacled cleric of good. Unfailingly honest, Piffany is also unwilling to seriously harm any living thing; the closest she comes is whacking things over the head with her staff while screaming "NAUGHTY! NAUGHTY! NAUGHTY!" She spends a lot of time putting Nodwick back together with her "duct tape of healing" and is probably the closest thing he has to a friend among the party. Although she possesses a great deal of wisdom and is the purest soul in the universe, Piffany isn't quite the brightest bulb in the box and is commonly manipulated by her companions.

Piffany is the only member of the party who treats Nodwick with any kind of dignity, but Artax and Yeagar often take advantage of her natural gullibility to use Nodwick to trigger traps "for the greater good." When she isn't patching Nodwick together or scolding Yeagar and Artax for their general naughtiness, Piffany spends her time proselytizing in the name of niceness and baking the universe's best cookies – the recipe of which was used to settle a dispute among the gods once. Despite their differences with the young cleric, Artax and Yeagar are actually quite protective of Piffany and would never let any harm come to her.

In Dragon #270's Giants in the Earth article, Piffany is described as being a Lawful Good Cleric of 8th level, with Nonweapon Proficiencies in Healing (using duct tape), Peacemaking (15), and Shame/Tsk-tsk-ing (18). She always carries duct tape of healing that can reattach heads, revive the dead and stop machinery. She wears +5 leather armor and wields a Staff of Harmony. The staff is an artifact acting as a +3 mace against naughty, warns the wielder of evil creatures of at least five Hit Dice nearby, and can cast the Command spell, as well as up to three 'charged' clerical spells for cases of emergency.

== Other characters ==
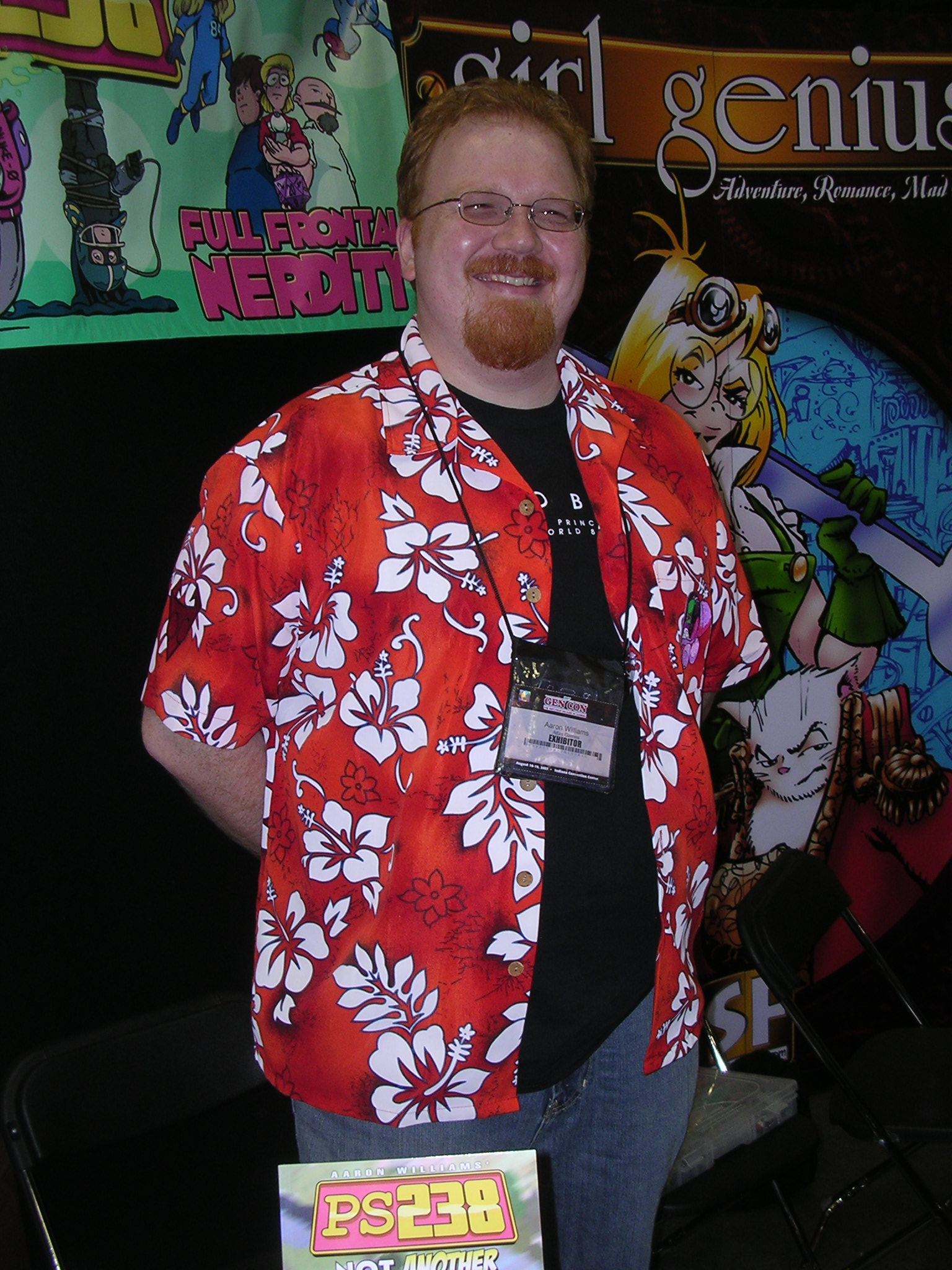
Aaron Williams, creator of Nodwick, at Gen Con Indy 2007.

- Count Repugsive: A recurring villain, similar in stature to Yeagar, wearing a skull-faced helmet. Described as an "anti-paladin." Repugsive is not a very effective villain; his schemes are often incomplete or downright silly, such as creating zombie hordes to move into cities, thus lowering property values so he can take over by buying at cheap prices. Should Repugsive die, he has the power to re-form in about a week, as was discovered after he exploded upon fighting a paladin (they canceled each other out). Recently, Count Repugsive was fitted with the Gauntlet of Supremacy, wiping his mind and channeling the spirit of the dead swordsman Utharr, Yeagar's evil counterpart; however, he was only "out of service" for a while, and eventually contested possession of their shared body, at least until Utharr and the Gauntlet were removed, permanently. It was also recently discovered that Repugsive is in fact a woman, and not a man as we had all been led to believe over the comic strip's history. She claims that she allowed the charade to continue because "evil gals are only taken seriously if they're hot", which she apparently wasn't even before her death. In the same story arc, he/she also admits to being the inventor of "healing strips", better known as Piffany's duct tape.
- Claret Copin: A bard Nodwick's run into a few times. She writes epic ballads about the group's heroic exploits, such as feeding Nodwick to hydras, sundering ancient seals with his head, and so on, which tend to make the four even bigger laughingstocks than they were before.
- Bezzler: An elf or half-elf thief who worked with the group before they hired Nodwick; they disposed of him when it came out that he was stealing from them. Bezzler came back seeking re-employment, but Nodwick managed to catch him stealing again, and so he parted ways with them once more – after stealing the clothes off Nodwick's back.
- Frigg: A kobold encountered by the group on a couple of occasions. Nodwick met Frigg while scouting ahead in a dungeon and struck up a conversation, but when he returned to the party with Frigg in tow, Nodwick's companions attacked the kobold. However, when they learned that Frigg was an economics major who could increase the value of their loot, they welcomed him with open arms. They ran into Frigg once more after that, when the kobold came to complain about Yeagar trashing his accounting firm.
- The Brotherhood of Evil Henchmen: A cabal of unsavory hirelings who desire to recruit Nodwick so they can learn from his "skills in the art of object transportation" (i.e., schlepping vast quantities of loot), in addition to their own talent of finding even the most strange, rare and unusual things for the use of their masters. The Brotherhood is "a band of humans, humanoids, and other mostly ill-spirited races, bound to serve those who strive to bring chaos and wickedness into the world." All of the Brotherhood's members have the same short, big-headed stature as Nodwick, although they lack the big nose all good/neutral henchmen develop. They are led by Theobor, a mysterious robed figure with glowing yellow eyes (actually, Baphuma'al in disguise). Theobor's chief lackey is Beobor, a dim-witted hunchback.
- Henchmen's Local 246: The henchmen's union, it is run by a (figurehead super-powered female) hamster that enables the adventurer's guild to deprive henchmen of their rights. One of several recurring staff members is Heathwick, a clerk of sorts. The Henchmen's Union also underwent an April Fool's Day ordeal every year at the hands of the wizard's and adventurer's guilds until the pranks got out of hand, unleashing a scourge upon an anti-prank parade and carnival Piffany's sisterhood was holding in front of the Henchmen's Union Hall. Piffany and her sisters then marched to city hall demanding action, with a resulting declaration of all April Fool's Day festivities being capital offenses.
- Baphuma'al: A dark god of foul magic, he appears every so often to give a glimpse of his multiversal plan to envelop the world in darkness. He was trapped in Nodwick's world for centuries after a wizard accidentally used a magical pillow on Baphuma'al's face at the stroke of midnight, summoning a tooth fairy who stole two of the deity's teeth, giving him a lisp. Upon regaining his teeth he returned to his home plane. When Nodwick was hurled into a parallel universe by the Cleft of the Cosmos, it was to a world dominated by Baphuma'al.
- Rowen: An attractive and intelligent woman with whom Yeagar is in love (he believes secretly, although it is obvious to all). Rowen and Yeagar were childhood friends and there are unanswered questions about some parts of her history. It has also been hinted at that Rowen might be less noble than Yeagar's idealized image of her is (as indicated by an incident with an illegal dragon mount).
- Orville: Rowen's riding dragon. Too dumb to defend his mistress in times of danger unless verbally alerted, and has a tendency to gobble up everything he finds edible, including Nodwick.

There's also an evil group who closely resembles the party, however, this group doesn't employ a henchman, except for their first appearance, when they tried to loot the Henchmen Cemetery.

- Utharr: Evil fighter and worshipper of Baphuma'al, he was lured to his death by Nodwick (who slapped a steak on his back and suggested that he examine a well that contained a tentacled, Lovecraftian monster), later revived by Elonan, and killed again in an avalanche. Currently, he inhabits Count Repugsive's body, controlling his undead army. One of the few persons who have elicited a fearful reaction from Yeagar "The accessories on their warrior! My spiked shoulder plates are no match for his blade-festooned finery!"
- Elonan: An evil female cleric, Elonan's evil career as a worshipper of Uthok ended when Piffany covered her armor with smileys; however, after losing her deity's favor, she started again as a cleric of Baphuma'al. According to Piffany, Elonan "Smells like the lead electric mandolinist for `Crossbows and Roses`".
- Ildomir: An evil elderly wizard. After Piffany destroyed his book of black magic, Baphuma'al gave him a new, even more sinister one. During their first encounter, Artax was quite impressed with his "permanent pyrotechnic effects", meaning glowing eyes with an energy release.

The group was defeated by the party in two separate occasions before they turned to worshipping Baphuma'al, and their power has been raised by the evil god.

The party has also run into various characters from classic D&D adventures and novels, such as Raistlin Majere from Dragonlance, Elminster from the Forgotten Realms, and Count Strahd von Zarovich from Ravenloft, as well as the game's creators, Gary Gygax and Dave Arneson. They've also encountered characters who appear to be from other sources as well (a pageful of cameos including Xena and Harry Potter in one issue, Death from The Sandman appearing in another, Spider-Man being chased by an amorous Lolth in a comic strip in Dragon Magazine, etc.).

== References to the comic ==
- "The Armory", a weapons supplement for Rolemaster Fantasy Role Playing system, contains a "Nodwick attack table," showing damage resulting from henchman throwing in the same format as normal weapon damage in that system.
- The background artwork for the Monsters chapter of Book of Vile Darkness contains two bone creatures preparing to ambush a party of adventurers that resemble the principal cast of Nodwick.
- In The Gamers: Dorkness Rising, a henchman named Nodwick, whose clothing and stature match the character, appears near the end of the film, performed by Steve Wolbrecht. In the final issue of the Nodwick comic series, Williams acknowledges Dead Gentlemen Productions for "giving Nodwick his film debut (and entry in the Internet Data Base)" in the film.
- In strip number 229 of The Order of the Stick, one of the characters, after remarking on one of the difficulties of being in a stick figure based role playing comic strip, says "I knew I should've taken tha job at 'Nodwick'."

== See also ==
Other roleplaying comic strips:

- Finieous Fingers
- Knights of the Dinner Table
- The Order of the Stick
- What's New with Phil & Dixie
- Wormy
