= Birds over the City =

- Russian: Птицы над городом
- Directed by: Sergey Nikonenko
- Written by: Semyon Freilich
- Produced by: Stanislav Rozhkov
- Starring: Mikhail Gluzsky; Igor Merkulov; Sergey Nikonenko; Raisa Kurkina; Sergey Obrazov
- Cinematography: Vyacheslav Shumskiy
- Edited by: Maria Rodionova
- Music by: Eduard Artemyev
- Production company: Gorky Film Studio
- Release date: 1974
- Running time: 70 min.
- Country: Soviet Union
- Language: Russian

Birds over the City (Russian: Птицы над городом, romanized: Ptitsy nad gorodom) is a 1974 Soviet drama film directed by Sergey Nikonenko.

== Plot ==
Andryusha and his fifth-grade classmates found poorly bound typewritten pages with the words 'Attack' in a pile of scrap materials. The guys enthusiastically read this collection of frontline stories. Their author Bukin, it turns out, lives nearby, in the next block. The man is not young and sickly; however, he does not succumb to the blows of fate. He devotes all his strength to the preservation of forest resources, and in his free time from these worries he continues to write stories, recalling certain episodes of a rich front-line life.

== Cast ==
- Mikhail Gluzsky as Aleksandr Vasilevich Bukin
  - Andrey Gluzsky as young Bukin
- Igor Merkulov as Andryusha
- Sergey Nikonenko as Vishnyakov
- Raisa Kurkina as Margo
- Sergey Obrazov as Misha Solodukha
- Lidiya Fedoseyeva-Shukshina as Lida Vishnyakova
- Svetlana Orlova as Lena
- Olga Shukshina as Olya
- Mariya Shukshina as Masha
- Andrey Vishnev as Vasya
- Vera Altayskaya as teacher
- Georgy Burkov as bulldozer driver
- Vadim Zakharchenko as Pal Palych
