= PS238 =

American comic book

Publication information
- Publisher: Do Gooder Press
- Publication date: 2002
- No. of issues: 51

Creative team
- Written by: Aaron Williams
- Artist: Aaron Williams

PS238 is an American comic book written and drawn by Aaron Williams and published by Do Gooder Press. It follows the lives of both teachers and students at an elementary school for children with superpowers, which the comic calls metaprodigies. It was also adapted into a role-playing game by Hero Games, using their Champions game system.

== Publication history ==
Issue #0 was published in November 2002. Until issue #20 it was published by Dork Storm Press and Henchman Publishing. In December 2006, Aaron Williams started posting the comic page by page on his website. The online version was updated Monday, Wednesday and Friday.

== Story overview ==
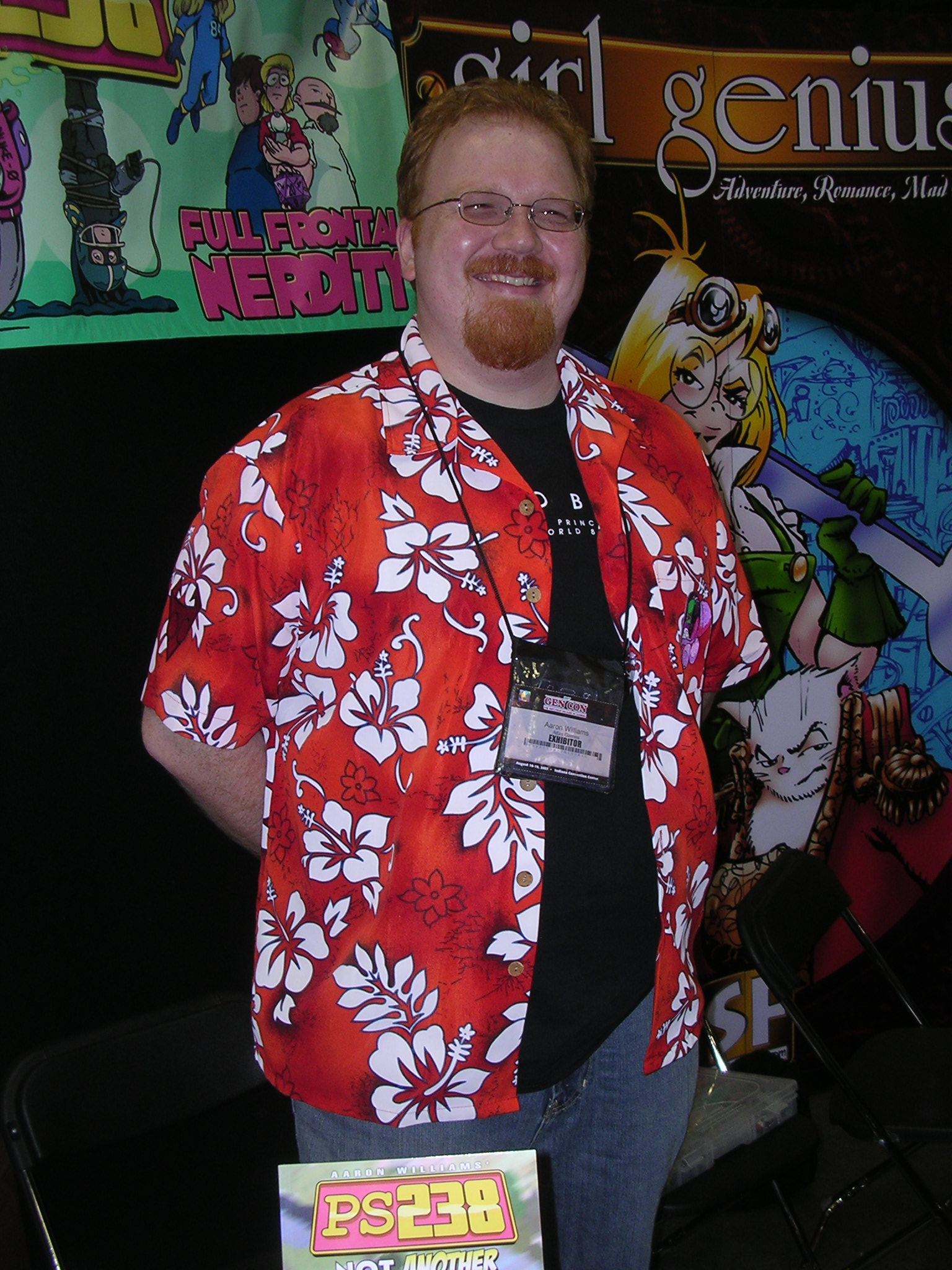
Aaron Williams, creator of PS238, at Gen Con Indy 2007.

In the storyline, PS238 is a school only recently founded, three miles below the seemingly normal Excelsior School, with many of the teachers having little or no experience teaching, because most of the teachers are former superheroes. Part of the school is made from the old satellite headquarters of the Union of Justice, a superhero team whose members founded the school.

Each of the Issues from #0-#2 follow different characters. Issue #3 introduces Tyler Marlocke, who becomes the central character. Tyler's parents, two of the most powerful metahumans, refuse to accept that their son has no superpowers and manage to enroll him in PS 238. Though the school let Tyler attend, but only after they determined that he would actually be safer at the school than subject to his parents' attempts to discover any latent superpowers he might have. The Revenant, a Batman analogue and crime-fighter with no superhuman abilities, is recruited as Tyler's tutor and mentor. Reluctantly Tyler assumes the identity of Moon Shadow, becoming Revenant's Robin-like sidekick. Toby, Tyler's clone, proclaims himself his twin brother. Tyler makes friends with Cecil Holmes, Ambriel, Angie, Julie, Malphast and many others. Only Zodon, of all PS 238 students, is hostile to Tyler - and Zodon is hostile to everybody. Tyler is so popular that he was once elected class president.

Within the fictional history of comic, the original Rainmaker Program was a US government project to study superhumans, with the aim of finding out how to give people superpowers (or take them away). The project started in the 1960s and focused on one boy, Harold Nelson, who had the power to make rain start and stop. The government had become increasingly insecure about metahumans and a boy who couldn't fight back with super-strength was an appealing research subject. For 6 years, Harold was put through tests to try to find how his power worked, but with little success. The scientist working on the project started to get worried about the lack of results and resorted to drastic measures. Enlisting the help of Dr. Irons (an imprisoned supervillain in a robotic body) they tried a new machine of Dr. Irons' own creation. The machine was actually made to enhance Harold's power, not to study it, and with a torrential downpour of rain, the lab wall was broken. In an ensuing explosion, Dr. Irons lost his body and Harold made a run for it carrying away Dr. Irons' still-functioning head. It is not known what happened to the Rainmaker Program after Harold's escape.

The modern day Rainmaker Program was started when PS238 was opened as an alternative program geared towards those with superpowers deemed unfit for super heroics. The program is very similar to that of the rest of the school except that the Rainmaker children don't participate in activities like combat training. Those in the program include:

- The Earthly incarnation of Hestia Goddess of the Hearth.
- Uther, a boy who can make anything into an edible substance.
- Zachary, a kid who can dig through any kind of soil or rock. He is one of Moon Shadow's biggest fans.
- Lyle, a boy who can deduce probable events from patterns around him.
- Kathy, a girl who can rebuild any object from its remains and repair any damaged machine (including Dr. Positron).
- Vera, a girl who can see the past of any item or area by looking at it or touching it.
- Alec, a boy whose drawings come to life.
- Orchid, a girl who can accelerate and intensify plant growth.
- Steve, a boy with musical powers.
- Marvin, who can put anyone to sleep instantaneously.
- Vern (see below).

== Characters ==
Many characters in PS238 are analogues, homages or outright parodies of heroes from other publishers. Other characters correspond to familiar superhero archetypes: they may or may not be direct references to heroes in other media.

=== Heroes ===
- Atlas came to Earth from the planet Argos, crashed in Iowa and was raised by an old farmer who had no children of his own. Atlas is vulnerable to Argonite, married a reporter, and at one point, had a pet super dog named Argo. The Superman parallels are obvious: Krypton/Argo, Kryptonite/Argonite, etc. The biggest difference is that Argos, unlike Krypton, has not been destroyed. Atlas thought most of his life that it had been, but in issue 42 he learns this was a deception. His Argonian name is Ul-Ron, and his Earth civilian name is Ron Peterson, Senior.
- The Revenant is, as stated before, much like Batman; he has no superpowers and instead relies on detective skills, gadgets, wealth, intimidation, physical and mental prowess in his war on crime. He is quoted as saying, "Sometimes I think access to cash is the greatest superpower of all." The Revenant is a character from a Michael Stackpole short story, “Peer Review”. Mr. Stackpole donated the Revenant to the PS238 project. Moon Shadow, Cecil Holmes, and The Flea are disciples and sidekicks of the Revenant.
- Several heroes are members of the team known as the Nuclear Family:
  - First Strike, team leader.
  - The Atomic Pile.
  - Mental Nucleus, mad inventor.
  - Plutonium Saber.

=== Faculty ===
The faculty of PS238 includes:

- Alfred Cranston, the school principal, with telekinetic and telepathic powers which he used to assist him in becoming president, though he claims only to have done it to be able to help others. When his mental powers were discovered, he faced a revolution until the Union of Justice intervened. Part of the negotiation for his peaceful leaving of office included starting PS238, with him as principal, to teach young meta-humans how to use their powers responsibly to avoid similar issues in the future. He also agreed to wear a headband which contained his mental powers, but the headband was eventually destroyed in an accident during a later issue.
- Herschel Clay, who teaches shop class and used to fight crime as the armored hero Mantium.
- The robotic Doctor Positron.
- The mystic Vashti Imperia, code-named "Spell Syrin."
- Coach Rockslide, with powers and appearance similar to Marvel Comics' character Benjamin Grimm (aka The Thing).
- Cristina Kyle (based on Aaron Williams' wife, Cristi), whose code name as a superhero was "Micro Might." Superpower is to shrink in size, but increase in strength and durability. She was the only faculty member who had experience as a teacher prior to starting the school.
- Alloy, who is similar to the Marvel Comics' X-Men character Colossus in general appearance, but seems to have the power to alter the atomic composition of metals on the periodic table - in one issue he is noted as changing the wall composition of PS238 into gold to make it easier for Rockslide to tear apart. Alloy also has a great love of Star Trek, as is shown in his zeal when Wil Wheaton shows up for a career fair at the school.
- Dr. Newby, a skilled professional MD with metahuman Healer abilities. Her patients include Murphy, Principal Cranston, Tyler, and Toby.

Of these, only Principal Cranston and Dr. Newby were not members of the Union of Justice. Ms. Kyle was the only faculty member who had any teaching experience before the school was founded; the others got a simulated crash course in teaching via one of Herschel's machines.

=== Students ===
Other than Tyler Marlocke, all the children at PS238 have superpowers:

- Victor Von Fogg (a nod to Victor Von Doom). He is the son of would-be world conqueror Doctor Philippe Von Fogg, whose name and face are suspiciously similar to those of cartoonist Phil Foglio, friend and colleague of Aaron Williams. The Von Fogg family lives in a huge armored Zeppelin (perhaps a reference to Castle Wulfenbach, a city-sized airship featured in the ongoing webcomic Girl Genius by Phil and Kaja Foglio).
- The Emerald Gauntlet (who has powers similar to Green Lantern). These two have a particularly contentious relationship as The Emerald Gauntlet (senior), is the parole officer for Victor's father. The Junior Gauntlet's real name is Kevin. He is Moon Shadow's biggest fan.
- Ambriel, code-named Guardian Angel. A mysterious force protects her from hazards and annoyances, from rain to other metahumans. She has a tendency to collect equipment from her adventures, to compensate for the passive nature of her powers. Most notably she possess a baseball bat which strikes with explosive force, built by a baseball themed supervillain.
- A blue Hulk-like child named Bernard.
- Murphy, a child version of Dream (a.k.a. Morpheus) from Neil Gaiman's The Sandman.
- Zodon, a genius gadgeteer who has a "Barry Ween" chip (replacing profanity with such terms as "Finland!" or "Gurgling piece of pot roast!", and larger strings of profanity with Rodgers and Hammerstein show tunes), a rivalry with Von Fogg over who will be the greater supervillain and a very vocal distaste for Tyler (centering on his lack of powers - and the fact that Tyler, of normal intellect, always outmaneuvers supergenius Zodon). Bald, abrasive and sarcastic, Zodon appears to be an underage version of MODOK. He also has a lot in common with Gizmo, a villain in the series Teen Titans.
- Malphast. Similar to an entity in Preacher. He comes from the Realm of Order and Chaos. His best friends are Tyler Marlocke and Cecil Holmes.
- Tom Davison, a time-traveler who resembles the Fourth Doctor, only a lot younger. Has a lot of affection and respect for Tyler. His name might be derived from Tom Baker and Peter Davison, the actors who portrayed the Fourth and Fifth Doctors.
- American Eagle and USA Patriot Act, respectively Democrat and Republican patriotic heroes. Each one aspires to be the successor to Freedom Fighter, the equivalent of Captain America.
- Alejandro Torres code-named The Flea. A junior version of Spider-Man, he aims pranks and zingers at the villains he fights.
- Julie code-named "84," The 84th person with the standard FISS (flight, invulnerability, speed, strength) powers. Like Atlas, she is affected by Argonite. She is polite, humble, and more reserved than many of the other heroes. She chose not to allow the fact that other superheroes tend to look down on those with FISS powers bother her, instead choosing her number as a code name to show she is proud of what she is. This eventually resulted in her unwittingly becoming an online celebrity and rallying call to other FISS, a status she clearly doesn't want but is trying her best to handle gracefully. She is friends with both Moon Shadow and Tyler but does not realize they are really the same person. In 2015 Julie had a crucial encounter with the legendary Russian witch Baba Yaga.
- Poly Mekkis, a girl with powers like Plastic Man and Mister Fantastic. Julie's best friend.
- Angie, a mad inventor and Techie. Good friends with Prospero and Tyler. She is the only one capable of understand Prospero, though she isn't able to explain how.
- Prospero, an alien with an undecipherable language. Disguised as an African exchange student.
- Suzi Fusion, a fearless little girl with superpowers of radioactivity.
- Toby Marlocke, also known as Ultimate Powers and Junior Powers. Basically, a clone of Tyler, but with DNA also from various superheroes. He considers himself Tyler's twin brother, and Tyler's parents have accepted him as such. Angie, Victor, the Cherub and the Imp all had a hand in creating Toby. His powers are immense and allow a large variety of abilities, however, they must be balanced out by some 'opposite' side effect. He desires a relationship as a brother with Tyler, but Tyler's own feelings of resentment due to Toby replacing him as a better son in his parents' eyes have prevented him from accepting Toby's attempts at bonding. Besides superpowers, there is another difference between the "twins": Tyler is left-handed, and Toby is right-handed.
- Franklin, a speedster. In looks, personality and powers, he is similar to Bart Allen, aka Impulse.
- Vern, an extremely powerful healer. He was able to resurrect Ambriel.

Excelsior School, located 3 miles above PS238, has provided several characters, most notably:

- Cecil Holmes, conspiracy buff, best friend of Tyler Marlocke, disciple of the Revenant, good pals with Alejandro Torres the Flea and with Malphast. He has the ability to detect those with superpowers, and originally thought they were aliens. Oddly enough, he sensed Ron Peterson who is the son of the alien Atlas.
- Satori Deacon, a girl who can see ghosts and spirits, and communicate with them.

The rival Praetorian school, headed by the Cyborg supervillain known as The Headmaster, includes in its student body:

- Charles Brigman, a teleporting bully, extortionist, kidnapper, terrorist, and thief.
- Ron Peterson, son of Atlas and of Lisa Larson, a famous journalist. Previously known as "Captain Clarinet," Ron has the new code name "Argonaut." His greatest weakness is not Argonite, but his lack of self-confidence. During a trip to the planet Argon, Ron was de-powered, and subsequently he was transferred from Praetorian to Excelsior. Being a normal boy in an ordinary school made him a much happier boy. Ron later gains the ability to interact with higher dimensions, allowing for him to perceive certain things/events around him, move as fast as he did with his old powers and even travel, both by himself or with others, through the aforementioned higher dimensions.
- Alexandria Von Fogg, Victor's sister.

The Realm of Order and Chaos, home of Malphast, includes some recurrent characters:

- Balagan, Lord of Chaos. ("Balagan" meand "mess" in several Slavic languages and in Hebrew)
- The Determinant, Ruler of Order.
- A Great Lady Demon of Chaos, mother of Malphast.
- A General of Seraphim, Warrior of Order, father of Malphast.
- The Cherub, agent of Order.
- The Imp, agent of Chaos.

== Stories set in other parts of the chronology ==
- In the episode "Time After Tyler," we see Tyler 15 years in the future. He still has his alter ego as Moon Shadow. He is now working on salary for the Revenant.
- One issue takes place in a mythological medieval Europe, where dragons and magic-users exist. This was the time and place of origin of Vashti Imperia. Nodwick and his colleagues have a guest turn.
- Zodon, while traveling through time, barely escapes being electrocuted by the truculent Native warrior Cloud-Splitter.

== Similar works ==
- The Golden Age of comics character Blue Beetle discovers a secret school for young metahumans. Like PS238's rival, Praetorian Academy, it is led by a "Headmaster," and some of the students have been abducted into it.
- The made-for-TV movie Up, Up, and Away, released by Disney in 2000, has a similar plot line, though without the school setting.
- The character of William Stronghold in the 2005 theatrical film Sky High closely resembles Tyler Marlocke as a child with no superpowers born to super parents and sent to a school for superpowered kids, which is isolated from the public. There was considerable controversy among Williams' fans about whether Sky High was plagiarized from PS238. So far, no evidence that this was the case has come to light. According to scifi.com, Disney was attracted by the "original concept" of "children of superheroes going to high school," originally conceived by screenwriter Paul Hernandez in the 1990s.
- Another similar feature, Revolution Studios and Columbia Pictures' film Zoom, was released in summer 2006.

== Graphic novel collections ==
1. With Liberty and Recess for All
2. To the Cafeteria... For Justice!
3. No Child Left Behind!
4. Not Another Learning Experience!
5. Extraterrestrial Credit
6. Acts of Senseless Tourism
7. Daughters, Sons, and Shrink-Ray Guns
8. When Worlds Go Splat!
9. Saving Alternate Omaha
