= Roads of Fire =

- Directed by: Nathaniel Lezra
- Starring: Maria Pascal
- Distributed by: New Mountain Films
- Release date: 2025
- Running time: 118 minutes
- Country: United States
- Language: English

Roads of Fire is a 2025 American documentary directed by Nathaniel Lezra.

== Overview ==
Documentary that tells story of an asylum seeker, a human smuggler and those on the frontlines of the global migration crisis. The film features Ecuador immigrant Maria Pascal living in New York City with her family as they learn the American government is beginning to deport them.

== Critical reception ==
POV, "Roads to Fire admittedly proves mentally and emotionally exhausting as it shares the traumatic experiences of its key figures. However, these are important and compelling stories that put human faces on all sides of a global crisis."

Film Threat, "Watching Roads of Fire brings the global migration crisis home to ground level for those with the fortitude to internalize Lezra’s documentary and live with seeing the human faces of the problem."

Film Focus Online, "Roads of Fire has done what great documentaries should: it opens our eyes and refuses to let us look away. We know the immigration system is broken, and at a time when frustrations are high and people are blaming one another, this documentary film helps audiences find their humanity and empathy."

== See also ==
- Open border
