= Aaron Williams (cartoonist) =

American cartoonist and writer

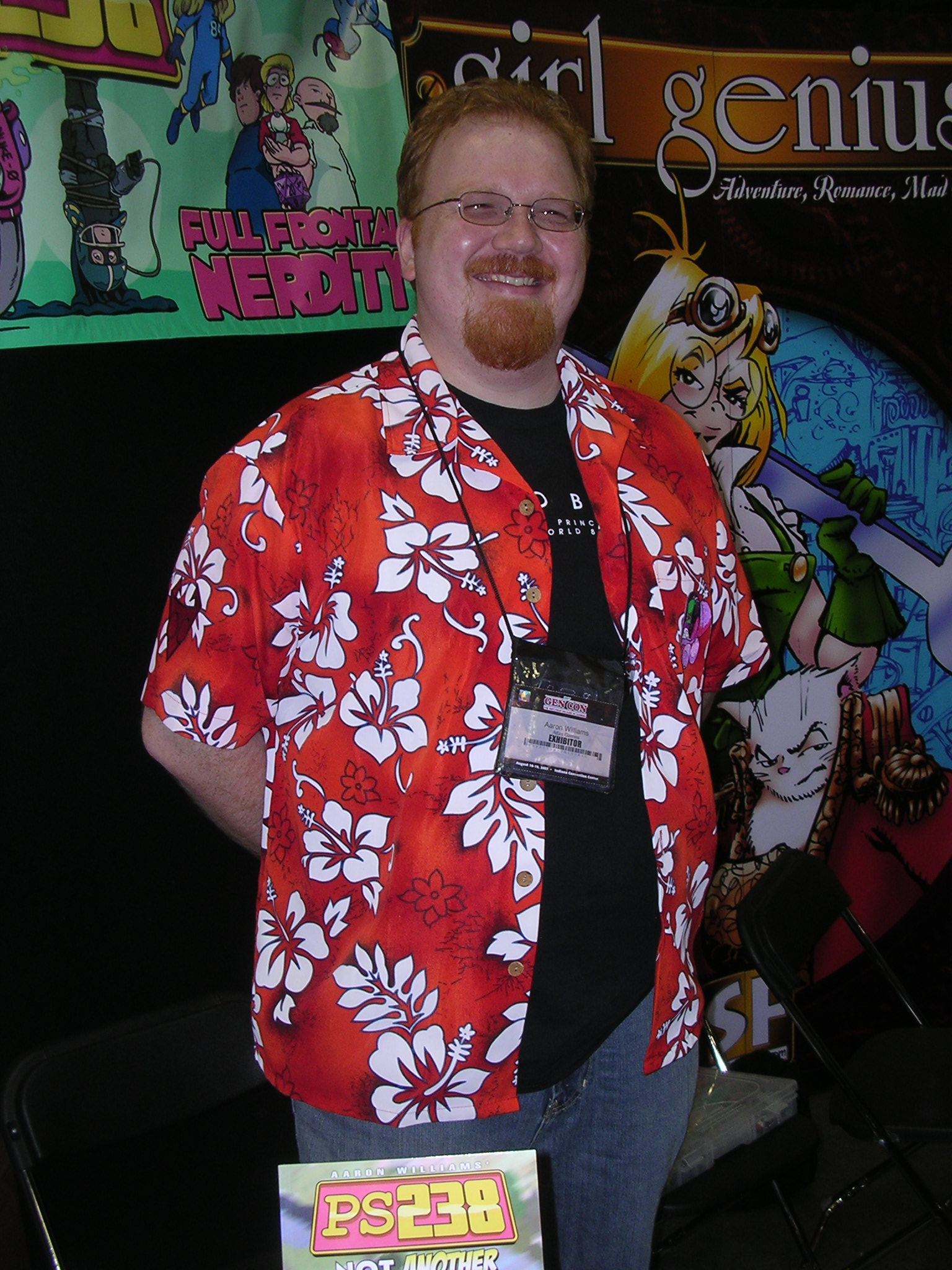
- Williams at Gen Con Indy 2007
- Born: Aaron Kyle Williams; December 15, 1970 (age 55) Kenosha, Wisconsin
- Areas: Cartoonist, Writer, Penciller, Artist, Inker, Publisher
- Notable works: Nodwick; PS238

Aaron Kyle Williams (born December 15, 1970) is an American cartoonist, illustrator, and writer best known for his extensive work in the comic and gaming industries. Williams has created several popular comic series, including Nodwick, PS238, and Full Frontal Nerdity.

== Career ==
Aaron Williams is most famous for his comics Nodwick, PS238 and Full Frontal Nerdity. He also is the creator of Backwards Compatible, a comic on the gaming news website Crispy Gamer.

Hero Games published PS238: The Roleplaying Game (2008), a standalone Hero System game based on the world of Williams' comic of the same name.

He also wrote a Wildstorm series called North 40, with art by Fiona Staples.

In November 2011, DC Comics started producing a 5 issue mini series of Diablo Written by Aaron Williams.

== Bibliography ==
Comics work includes:

- Nodwick (script and art, Henchman, January 2000 – September 2006)
- PS238 (script and art, Dork Storm Press, December 2002 – July 2009)
- Full Frontal Nerdity (script and art, one-shot, Dork Storm Press, November 2004). The strip appears online, and as an extra in PS 238.
- Truth, Justin, and the American Way (with co-author Scott Kurtz and art by Giuseppe Ferrario, 5-issue limited series, Image Comics, 2006–2007)
- "Dinner at MacArthur's Cafe" (with art by Casey Jones, in Spider-Man Unlimited No. 13, Marvel Comics, March 2006)
- North 40 (with art by Fiona Staples, 6-issue limited series, Wildstorm, July – December 2009)
- Diablo (series) (with art and covers by Joseph LaCroix, 5-issue limited series, DC Comics, November 2011 – March 2012
