= Alexander Khmelik =

- Born: Alexander Grigorievich Khmelik; September 27, 1925; Alupka, Crimean ASSR, Russian SFSR, Soviet Union
- Died: December 8, 2001 (aged 76); Moscow
- Occupations: Screenwriter; director; producer; playwright
- Years active: 1951–2001
- Awards: Honoured Artist of the RSFSR

Alexander Grigorievich Khmelik (Russian: Александр Григорьевич Хмелик) (September 27, 1925 – December 12, 2001) was a Soviet-Russian screenwriter, playwright and director known for his creation of the children's sketch series Yeralash. He was formerly a head of All-Union Radio (1948–1950), a literary employee in the newspaper Pionerskaya Pravda (1951–1953), literary editor of the journal Vozhaty (1953–1958), head of the department of literature and art at the newspaper Pionerskaya Pravda (1958–1963), the editor in chief of the creative association of Youth Films at Mosfilm (1963–1969). He was also a deputy of the Gorky Film Studio from 1974 to 1987.
