= Boris Rytsarev =

Boris Rytsarev

Boris Vladimirovich Rytsarev (Russian: Борис Владимирович Ры́царев; 30 June 1930 in Moscow – 25 November 1995 in Moscow) was a Soviet and Russian film director.

== Filmography ==
=== Director ===
- 1958 — The Youth of Our Fathers
- 1958 — Ataman Codr
- 1961 — Above the Sky
- 1963 — Forty Minutes before Dawn
- 1964 — Valera
- 1966 — Aladdin's Magic Lamp
- 1969 — Funny Magic
- 1972 — Lights
- 1974 — Ivan and Marya
- 1977 — The Princess on a Pea
- 1978 — Gift of the Black Sorcerer
- 1979 — Take Me with You
- 1980 — Granddaughter of Ice
- 1983 — Apprentice Healer
- 1986 — Sitting on the Golden Porch
- 1988 — Name
- 1992 — Emelya the Fool and Elena the Beautiful

=== Scenario ===
- 1958 — The Youth of Our Fathers
- 1963 — Do Not Cry, Alyonka (short film)
- 1979 — Take Me with You
- 1980 — Granddaughter of Ice
- 1986 — Sitting on the Golden Porch
- 1992 — Emelya the Fool and Elena the Beautiful
