= Boris Grachevsky =

Russian screenwriter (1949–2021)

- Борис Грачевский
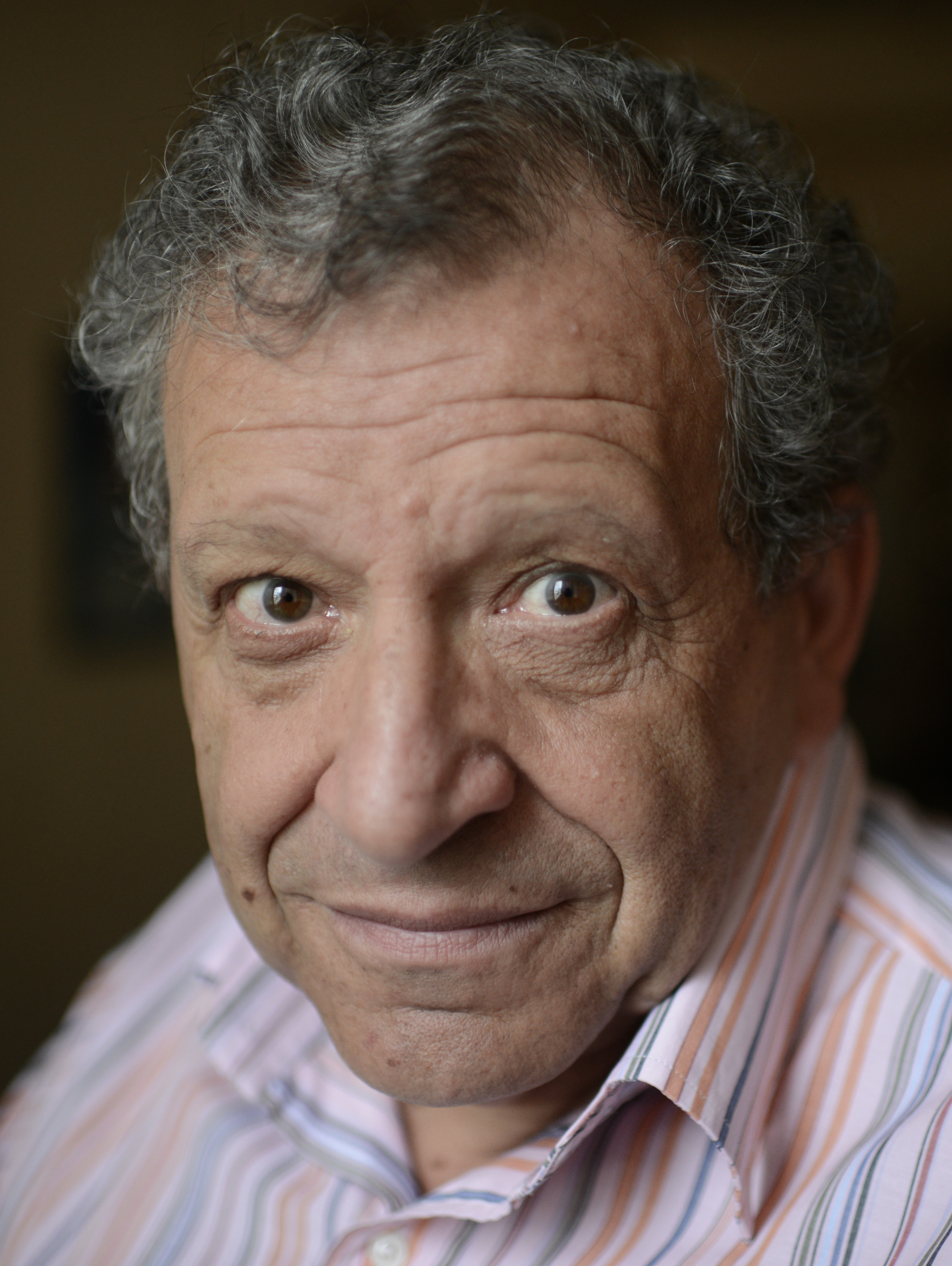
- Grachevsky in 2013
- Born: Boris Yurevich Grachevsky; 18 March 1949; Ramensky District, Moscow Oblast, Russian SFSR, USSR
- Died: 14 January 2021 (aged 71); Moscow, Russia
- Education: Gerasimov Institute of Cinematography
- Occupations: Film producer; film director; actor; screenwriter
- Years active: 1970–2020
- Spouse(s): Galina (1970–2005); Anna (2010–2014); Yekaterina (2016–2021)
- Awards: Order of Honour; Order of Friendship

Boris Yurevich Grachevsky (Russian: Борис Юрьевич Грачевский; 18 March 1949 – 14 January 2021) was a Russian film director, screenwriter, and actor. His family was of Jewish descent. He was artistic director of the children's TV show and magazine Yeralash.

He died of COVID-19 during the COVID-19 pandemic in Russia.

== Awards and honors ==
- Order of Honour (2009)
- Order of Friendship (2019)
- Honored Artist of the Russian Federation (2000)
