= Gennady Vasilyev =

Russian film director

Gennadi Leonidovich Vasilyev (Russian: Геннадий Леонидович Васильев; 31 August 1940 — 21 October 1999) was a Russian film director. He is best known for his film Finist, the brave Falcon (1975).
