= The Kingdoms of Kalamar =

Tabletop fantasy role-playing game supplement

Cover of first printing, 1994

The Kingdoms of Kalamar is a fantasy role-playing game campaign setting published by Kenzer & Company in 1994 that is compatible with the second edition of Advanced Dungeons & Dragons published by TSR. Several other editions of the game were subsequently released as new editions of Dungeons & Dragons were published.

== Description ==
The Kingdoms of Kalamar is a fictional fantasy role-playing game setting that describes the Kingdoms of Kalamar on the planet Tellene, providing details of its inhabitants, flora and fauna, geography, religions, and nations.

== Publication history ==
=== 1st edition: Kenzer & Co. ===
David Kenzer and his friends Brian Jelke and Steve Johansson, who played AD&D, decided to start the game company Kenzer & Company in 1994 to produce material for the 2nd edition of AD&D. Their first project was The Kingdoms of Kalamar, an unlicensed fantasy world created without permission of TSR. Kalamar specifically did not mention AD&D, and was advertised as a generic setting that could be adapted to any role-playing game system but was designed to be compatible with the second edition of AD&D. A note on the back cover clarified that the setting was "suitable for use with Advanced Dungeons & Dragons" with a disclaimer "Advanced Dungeons & Dragons is a registered trademark of TSR Hobbies, Inc. Use of this trademark is NOT sanctioned by the holder."

The Kingdoms of Kalamar was packaged in a ziplock bag (and later as a box set) and included:

- "Volume 1: Sourcebook of the Sovereign Lands" details the people and places of Tellene, the campaign's continent (and world). It divides the continent into six regions and examines each one on a large scale.
- "Volume 2: Mythos of the Divine and Worldly" details the setting's 43 gods. It also describes secret societies, astrology and the calendar.
- Two large 24"x36" full-color maps
- A measuring tool for determining distances on the maps.

Kenzer & Company produced two more expansions for The Kingdoms of Kalamar in 1997, then went into hiatus for two years. When the company returned to business, it produced what game historian Shannon Appelcline called "a set of cheap and small Kalamar Quest adventures (1999–2000)."

==== Reception to 1st edition ====
In Issue 16 of Shadis (November 1994), Scott Johnson liked the quality of the maps, writing, "The maps are beautiful and rival those of any other company on the market, including TSR. You will also appreciate the fact that they are printed on a heavy, durable stock which should survive all the abuses that gamemasters and players will likely subject them to over the years." Johnson was "pleasantly surprised" by the book about religion, commenting, "While the book does detail information about the many gods of the world, it does much more, detailing the religions and how they affect the political and social structure of the world as well as detailing the priests of each religion. I came away from the read with hundreds of ideas for adventures." Johnson concluded, "If you are a game master looking for a good world setting to run your game in or a world builder with your own campaign already going, The Kingdoms of Kalimar offers you a refreshingly generic view and more than your money's worth. I highly recommend it."

In the December 1996 edition of Dragon (Issue #236), Rick Swan especially liked the religion section, and called the color maps "lush". Swan concluded with a recommendation to buy, saying, "the mountain of campaign fodder should be enough to keep your players busy until they're ready for the rest home."

In the 2014 Designers & Dragons: The '90s, game historian Shannon Appelcline noted that "Though small press, [Kalamar] was lauded for its colorful maps and its attention to details — making it in some ways like a more fantasy-oriented version of Columbia Games' classic Hârn."

==== Other 1st edition reviews ====
- d8 Magazine Issue 1 (1995, p. 66)
- The Guild Companion (December 2001)
- Legions Realm Monthly Issue 5 (January 2003, p. 1)

=== Dungeons & Dragons 3 ===
Kingdoms of Kalamar Campaign Setting; a sourcebook with D&D licensed logo

In the late 1990s, as Wizards of the Coast (WotC) developed a Dungeons & Dragons 3rd edition, Kenzer & Co. negotiated with them to produce a licensed version that would use the new rules. On November 1, 2000, WotC announced via press release that Kingdoms of Kalamar, produced by Kenzer & Company, would become an official Dungeons & Dragons world using the Third Edition rules.

The Sourcebook of the Sovereign Lands and the Mythos of the Divine and Worldly were combined, and nearly 100,000 words of new material were added to create a hardcover book retitled Kingdoms of Kalamar Campaign Setting Sourcebook that was published in 2001. Shannon Appelcline noted that this campaign setting was the first Third Edition licensed product to market, even beating out WotC's own Forgotten Realms campaign setting. Appelcline also noted that, due to its "first to market" position, "the new Kalamar line did much better than its first incarnation." Kenzer & Company subsequently released 30 licensed products to support it.

This edition was nominated for the Origins Award for Best Roleplaying Game.

In 2005, the last Kalamar products were released as hardcover books sporting the D&D logo. Subsequent products were released by Kenzer & Company as PDFs with no D&D logo.

On July 11, 2007, Kenzer & Company announced that their license with WotC would expire in August of that year.

==== Reception to D&D 3 edition ====
In Issue 31 of the French games magazine Backstab, Michaël Croitoriu compared this edition to watching Ingmar Bergman's The Seventh Seal, saying, "After half an hour, you're sound asleep. In fact, it took me no less than ten days to digest this game world." Croitoriu blamed this on the strategy of simply reprinting all of the old material from the 1st edition and adding some new material rather than starting from scratch and rewriting the entire setting. Croitoriu also was not impressed with the interior art, calling it "worthy of an eight-year-old child." He also noted that there were no new races, character classes, or significant new rules in this edition. Croitoriu recommended that any other rival campaign setting for the Third Edition would be a better alternative to this product.

Pyramid found that while the original edition of The Kingdoms of Kalamar originally had numerous game stats relating to 2nd edition Dungeons & Dragons, once the Kingdoms were made an official Dungeons & Dragons setting in third edition, it had very few D&D specific references.

=== Hackmaster ===
In 2006, Kenzer & Company announced that Kingdoms of Kalamar would be the official setting of the second version of their HackMaster roleplaying game.

=== Dungeons and Dragons 4th edition ===
In 2008, WotC released Dungeons & Dragons 4th edition. In the summer of 2008, Kenzer & Company released a compilation of the Campaign Setting and Atlas as a new PDF updated to Fourth Edition rules.

This release was not published under the terms of WotC's Game System License (GSL), becoming the first third-party publication to do so. Company president David Kenzer, a lawyer specializing in Intellectual Property, posted on the internet, "Copyright infringement is basing your work on someone else's creative expression. Rules are not creative expression. Also, it is not ‘based’ on their rules. It happens to 'work with' their rules."

Like many products created by various publishers using Fourth Edition rules, this edition of Kalamar was unsuccessful, and Kenzer and Company did not produce any supplements.
