= Knights of the Dinner Table Illustrated =

Cover of the 1st issue.

Knights of the Dinner Table Illustrated (a.k.a. K.ILL) is a comic book created by Jolly R. Blackburn and published by Kenzer & Company. It portrays many of the same stories as Knights of the Dinner Table (KODT) but from the point of view of the player characters.

The first monthly issue was published in June 2000. Knights of the Dinner Table Illustrated (as well as HackMasters of Everknight and its sequel Everknights) was a comic set in the fictional world of the Knights of the Dinner Table in-game characters, and it ran for 41 issues.

The comic was suddenly cancelled seemingly mid-story with issue #41 when suddenly (in strip) the "set" which the characters were "acting" on was knocked over. The "director" then informs the "cast" that the series was cancelled due to a lack of sales. There was no other explanation listed within the book other than the movie set parody listed in strip.

== Characters ==
The comic centers on the Untouchable Trio (plus one): the battlemage Teflon Billy, the fighter El Ravager and the thief Knuckles, King of the Wallclimbers. Initially the plus one was the barbarian Zayre, who eventually departed and was replaced by Thorina.

The comic occasionally follows the adventures the Black Hands and other characters from KODT, sometimes in other universes (e.g. Cyberhack).

K.ILL is strictly and humorously faithful to the concept that its characters are experiencing reality, and are not merely characters in a role-playing game. Some of the humor stems from the explanations that the characters give for events that, in KODT, stem from the gameplayers' mundane commitments or, in reality, from the comic's business decisions. For example, when Bob (in KODT) is unable to game for a while, Knuckles (in K.ILL) is unavailable due to commitments to his Guild. When K.ILL's artists changed in issue 4, the characters experience and comment on the alteration in their appearance as the result of a Hazenberg's Dimension Shifting Portal of Chaos. K.ILL is noticeably more graphically violent than KODT, even while depicting the same event, since in the latter the in-game violence is represented only by dialogue.

== Contributors ==
- Development team: Jolly R. Blackburn, Brian Jelke, Steve Johansson, David S. Kenzer
- Writers:
  - Issues 1–4: Aaron Williams, Jolly R. Blackburn, Brian Jelke, Steve Johansson, David S. Kenzer
  - Issues 8–41: Mark Plemmons. Earlier issues in this run are often based on ideas by Jolly R. Blackburn and other members of the development team, with more original stories as the series progressed.
- Art:
  - Issues 1–4: Aaron Williams
  - Issues 4–41: Brian Fraim, Brendon Fraim

== See also ==
- Nodwick
- Dork Tower
- Order of the Stick
