= Fuzzy Knights =

Online comic by Noah J.D. Chinn

- Author: Noah J.D. Chinn
- Website: https://www.noahchinnbooks.com/fuzzyknights/
- Current status/schedule: Occasional
- Launch date: December 8, 2002
- Genre(s): Role-playing games, parody, stuffed animals

Fuzzy Knights is an online comic created by Noah J.D. Chinn and published by Kenzer & Company. It stars stuffed animals who enjoy role-playing games such as HackMaster and Dungeons & Dragons. What started out as a simple one-shot tribute to the Kenzer gamer comic series, Knights of the Dinner Table, turned into a cult hit that continues to gain new fans. Gary Gygax, co-creator of Dungeons & Dragons, was an admitted fan of the Fuzzy Knights and wrote a promo for the trade paperbacks (see below).

== Production ==
The first online strip appeared on Noah's personal website on December 8, 2002. Not long after, it was given a print strip within the Knights of the Dinner Table magazine itself, starting with issue 75. The Fuzzy Knights Online strips moved to the Kenzer & Company website on April 8, 2003, with updates twice a week.

The Fuzzy Knights cast and crew started production in facilities in Tokyo, Japan but in late 2004 made the move to a new studio in London, England. After a brief hiatus due to the move to London, the Fuzzy Knights kicked off a new storyline with a live-action mockumentary, Fuzzy Knights 2: The L.A.R.P. The stand-alone story arc known as Tabletop Campaigns, finished its run on January 26, 2007, with episode 114. The original Tournament War storyline began reruns in February 2007 using a four-panel per page format to save space on the servers. After an extended hiatus, the L.A.R.P. storyline resumed production in the summer of 2008.

== Characters ==
The main stars of the strip were four stuffed animals. Mossfoot, the adventurous green teddy bear, is the leader and Game Master for the group. Violet, the violet and sometimes violent teddy bear, is Mossfoot's girlfriend. The other stars are Target, the black cat who hates LARPs (Live Action Role-Playing), and Ben Bunny, who speaks with a Scottish accent that occasionally slips into Jamaican. Collectively they call their role-playing group the Fuzzy Knights and they have had several adventures away from the gaming table.

Many other living "fuzzies," as the characters are called, inhabit the Fuzzy Knights world and most of them seem to be drawn toward role-playing games as well. The first story arc of the series involves fuzzies gathering from around the world for a HackMaster tournament that ends up turning into a war against an insane hamster toy named HamaEstra and his army of robots that appear to be arts & crafts projects made by kindergartners.

== Trade paperbacks ==
In December 2003 the Fuzzy Knights' first 22 online strips were reprinted in a trade paperback called Tails From The Table that included liner notes from the creator and bonus strips. Volume two of the series went on sale at Gen Con Indy in August 2005. Even though the strips are reproduced in a smaller size and a black & white format, they enable new readers to catch up with the backstory up to the beginning of the Tournament War.

In January 2006 the first trade paperback was reissued in PDF format.

== Fuzzy Knights RPG ==
In 2005, an original role-playing game set in the Fuzzy Knights universe was produced by the series creator and went on sale as a PDF download at the Kenzer & Company website.
