= Knights of the Dinner Table =

Comic book/strip by Jolly R. Blackburn

- Logo of the series
- Author: Jolly Blackburn
- Website: www.kenzerco.com
- Current status/schedule: Active
- Launch date: March/April 1990
- Genre(s): Humor, role-playing, fantasy
- Followed by: Knights of the Dinner Table Illustrated

Knights of the Dinner Table (KoDT) is a comic book/strip created by Jolly R. Blackburn and published by Kenzer & Company. It primarily focuses on a group of role playing gamers and their actions at the gaming table, which often result in unfortunate, but humorous consequences in the game. The name is a parody of King Arthur's Round Table reinforced by the truism that roleplaying aficionados often end up sitting round their host's dinner table as it is the only one large enough to accommodate the party (four to eight people typically).

== The comic ==
The panels are written by Blackburn, and given that he had no formal art training, the characters are drawn in simple caricatures which are scanned onto a computer and are continuously reused. Many of the stories presented in KoDT are based on actual in-game experiences of the developers or readers, who are encouraged to submit story ideas. Part of the comic's popularity stems from the reader's ability to relate to the characters and their experiences.

KoDT has won the Origins Awards for Best Professional Game Magazine of 1998 and 1999. It also won the Origins Award Gamer's Choice: Best Periodical of 2003. KoDT has also won the Origins Award for Best Game Accessory of 2009.

== Publication history ==
Shadis editor Jolly Blackburn decided to draw a simple comic strip of his own to put on the last page of Shadis #2 (March/April 1990) which he called Knights of the Dinner Table, focusing on the comedic interactions of a role-playing game group. Blackburn published that initial Knights strip with the intention of just filling an otherwise blank page, but when he instead published more professional comic strips starting with Shadis #6, fans began an outcry that led to Blackburn bringing Knights back. Blackburn also published Knights of the Dinner Table as a comic book, with its first three issues published by his company Alderac Entertainment Group over the next year (1994-1995). Blackburn had other interests that were not shared by his partners, so he left Alderac in 1995 and took the rights to Knights of the Dinner Table with him, and Shadis #21 (December 1995) was his final issue. Blackburn formed his own company called KODT Enteractive Facktory, though which he intended to publish the monthly Knights of the Dinner Table comic book, and he was planning to continue the comic strip in Shadis. While setting up his new company, Blackburn got a call from the editor of Dragon to publish the Knights of the Dinner Table comic strip, which then first appeared in Dragon #226 (February, 1996). The run that lasted through issue #269 (March 2000), when it was replaced by an expanded Nodwick strip.

Blackburn was working on Knights of the Dinner Table #4 (1996) when he realized he did not want to do everything alone, and he was talking to David Kenzer and the staff at Kenzer & Company who wanted him to work for their company. David Kenzer and others were visiting with Blackburn in November 1996 during a local convention, when Blackburn decided that Kenzer had both the business sense and integrity that he wanted in a partner. Beginning with Knights of the Dinner Table #5 (February 1997) the comic book was the work of the "KoTD Development Team" which was made up of Jolly Blackburn, David Kenzer, Brian Jelke and Steve Johansson.

== Characters ==
=== The Knights of the Dinner Table ===
The main group of characters are the members of a gaming group known as "The Knights of the Dinner Table" in a fictionalized version of Muncie, Indiana. The players' best-known and most often-used characters are the HackMaster characters known as the "Untouchable Trio (Plus One)" (abbreviated as "UT+1"). They consist of:

==== Boris Alphonzo "B.A." Felton ====
B.A. is the GM and current organizer of the Knights (although the group was founded, and GMed, by Brian). In his 30s, he lives with his mother due to a failed attempt at game design, and works at the local pizza shop known as the Pizza-A-Go-Go, as well as his father's dry cleaning shop. B.A. has a bad reputation among the Knights for being ruthlessly cunning, largely because the players tend to be paranoid and to react poorly to setbacks, and any attempt at normal gameplay usually ends in misery (or complete and utter disaster). He often finds his games thwarted or sabotaged by the antics of the other players, much to his dismay.

He is also a sucker for the local game-shop owner, "Weird Pete" Ashton (see "The Black Hands Gaming Society", below), who constantly finds ways to sell him new or over-stocked product, on the basis that it's just what B.A. needs to spice up his campaigns. B.A. was supposedly based on Jolly Blackburn himself. B.A. from late 2005 to early 2006 took a furlough from GMing, having seen too many of his hard-worked campaigns reduced to rubble, the last such disaster prior to his furlough being a difficult situation revolving around two self-aware swords. His place behind the GM screen was temporarily taken by Brian VanHoose. B.A.'s return to the gamemaster's seat was heralded by his acquisition of a copy of the infamously deadly Temple of Horrendous Doom HackMaster scenario created by "Weird Pete". Now he's taken up a more hardball approach in the hopes of reining in the power gaming that wrecked most of his previous adventures.

==== Robert Samuel "Bob" Herzog ====
Bob lives for gaming. He's a member of the "Old School" style of playing which revolves around killing people and breaking things. His short temper has led him into trouble on many occasions. He reacts to most encounters with "I waste him/her/it with my crossbow!". Bob is extremely protective of his large dice collection. At one point, Bob came into conflict with his father over gaming, given the option to straighten up and give up gaming, or move out. Being the true gamer, Bob did indeed move out, and is currently attempting to live on his own, but tends to spend his rent money on gaming paraphernalia. Bob's favourite character in fantasy campaigns is a dwarf named Knuckles (ranging from Knuckles, King of the Wall-climbers to Knuckles the Eighth), who rides a mule named "Little Mike" which he believes to be a "Dwarven Warhorse."

Bob is married to Sheila Horowitz, a member of another Muncie gaming group, the Dorm Troopers. Bob currently works for Weird Pete at the till, getting paid in gaming stock each week, because Weird Pete cannot afford to pay him in actual money. Bob has little qualms with this arrangement, and has even made Sara compliment him on how enthusiastic he is.

==== David "Dave" Harcord Bozwell ====
The youngest of the Knights, Dave is a student at Ball State University, where he studies Cultural Anthropology and Dance Theory (the latter of the two for the purpose of meeting girls). He originally used to show up for the food, but really got into the game despite a bad first encounter with Johnny (a former Knight who gouged Dave out of a priceless gem). Dave is the typical "Hack-N-Slash" player, who becomes bored easily in non-action situations. When faced with talking things through (at which he is poor), or fighting, Dave chooses the latter. Dave, until recently, played a character by the name of El Ravager, wielding a coveted Hackmaster +12 sword named "Tremble". He lusts to own a god-level Magic Sword, but dreads the possibility of such a blade having its own ideas of what it is to be used for.

More recently (late 2006) in B.A.'s newest campaign, Dave has changed tactics (in part thanks to B.A.'s new hardball rules) and is playing a magic-user named El Mardico with, it must be said, some margin of success. Brian has therefore provided Dave with tutelage on how to properly run a mage – for a small fee. Dave was once involved with local Game Master Patty Gauzweiller; he later broke it off but she still had feelings for him, leaving him a target for her flirtatious tactics. This, however, seems to have disappeared with time.

==== Sara Ashlyn Felton ====
B.A.'s cousin Sara, the only female member of the group, prefers games with a focus on role playing rather than the pure action. Often, she tries to solve issues in-game through negotiation, while the others prefer violence. Exactly how she, playing a 'good' character, came to unleash upon the game-world a blood-thirsty pack of pit bulls to attack and devour anything alive they come across (and quite a few not-alive things as well) is an entirely different story, and one Sara would like the world to forget about (even if she never will). Usually the voice of reason, Sara has reflexes that would scare a striking cobra and has been known to have a hair-trigger temper on certain subjects (sexist remarks being perhaps the foremost); Bob, Dave and Brian have all had their shirt collars wrenched by a fuming Sara at least once.

Unlike the guys who all have their favorite characters, whose descendants they want to return to, Sara has played different characters, including barbarians like Zayre and Thorina and clerics like Justinia. She also has the distinction of being the person that broke Brian's undefeated streak at Risque (a parody of Risk). Brian is not fond of being reminded of this. Sara was supposedly based on Jolly Blackburn's wife, Barbara Blackburn.

==== Brian Montgomery VanHoose ====
Brian is the rules lawyer and powergamer of the group. A web designer and miniature painter, he lives alone in a house inherited from his parents. He can quote rules and supplements down to page and paragraph/footnote numbers, and bend and abuse this knowledge to his advantage, at times at the expense of other players. He meticulously hands down notes of earlier adventures to his characters' descendants, thereby giving them in-game access to knowledge they otherwise would not possess, and has been known to tattoo his character's spells on fellow party-members backs as a contingency plan, making them into walking grimoires. Brian is another person said to keep a grudge so long he has a regular account at the taxidermists' shop. In addition, when he does get pushed too far (either by a carefully constructed plot falling apart or a bout of in-game backstabbing), he has been known to flip the table in a moment of rage.

His weaknesses include a miserly streak that makes him charge other players 15 cents apiece for character sheets (and non-KoDT affiliated gamers 25 cents), and a love for dogs that can lead to B.A. leading him by the nose towards traps and misfortunes. Brian's trademark characters are wizards, all bearing the name Lotus. His most well-known character is known as Teflon Billy, but this was a nickname given by the group to a character originally named Black Lotus (Black Lotus gives BL which gives Billy, and "Teflon" refers to the uncanny skill of the character at avoiding damage). Formerly a renowned Game-Master, he abandoned the GM's Screen after an unspecified incident at a convention, but has recently taken it up again (after B.A. was burned out by repeated trashings of his best efforts in GMing), to run a complex Cattlepunk campaign. This campaign terminated with the sudden reversal of Brian's meticulous plans, at the hands of an alliance between B.A. and Sara, and an unexpected role-reversal, (from cringing dupe to back-shooting plotter) on the part of Bob's character; Brian threw the reins back to B.A., returning to the role of player, saying that he had only GM'd in order to keep his HMPA-GM credentials fully valid.

Brian has also appeared as a tragic character more than once; in his youth, his parents were killed in a car crash, and his uncle managed his inheritance until he turned eighteen. Living on his own, he concocts elaborate fantasies which he narrates to the other players about being taken globetrotting by his uncle for Christmas, or having a girlfriend (see Alexis Marie below), sometimes even making bogus phone calls or actually booking hotel rooms to strengthen the illusion. In one extreme case, Brian has been portrayed as role-playing a date with a doll, which he referred to as "Sara"; in another, when the Knights had met for pizza and were drawing from a prop Deck of Many Things that Brian made and imagining what would happen if the deck was real and affected their real lives, Brian drew the card "the Void" ("Body functions, but soul is trapped elsewhere"), and responded with "That pretty much describes my life already." It has also been suggested Brian's state may be linked to the fact that Brian previously ran six separate campaigns every week, and was paid for GMing, and further that there may be links between this and "the incident" which caused Brian to give up GMing. Recent issues have not mentioned this aspect of the plot, and it may have been dropped, as a number of reader's letters suggested that readers found these developments too disturbing. On a number of occasions (such as the doll incident mentioned above), Brian has displayed evidence of a severe crush on Sara; he has not, however, ever openly acknowledged this to her.

=== The Black Hands Gaming Society ===
Usually represented as the "evil" counterpart to the Knights, as most of their games revolve around the PCs finding reasons to kill each other before completing the intended adventure. Their membership consists of players who have been rejected from all other local groups, and hence they remain together simply because none of them has anywhere else to go. They are far more results-oriented than the Knights, enforcing demerit policies when Weird Pete is behind the GM screen (often worked off by unpaid labor behind Weird Pete's counter), and holding extensive post-mortems on their game sessions, to see where things could have been done better (usually by the members of the group not slaughtering one another's characters for minor infractions of local "rules", to vent a real-life grudge, or to gain experience points needed to advance their own character a level or two). They are especially prone to do this to "new" characters—most all of them have a psychological "button" which triggers a desire to execute a character based solely on race, attitude or type of clothing (e.g. looking like the character might be an assassin).

- Victor "Nitro" Fergueson: Former Marine and the current GM of the Black Hands; he resorts to increasingly contrived methods to keep the group in order, including using demerits, using incentives, and forcing players to wear "hubcaps of shame" if warranted. Supposedly earned his name after an incident taking part in the steam tunnels under the local University where Nitro attempted to run a "live action" session. For some reason yet to be fathomed, Nitro has a habit of using deceased celebrities of cult-like status as NPCs in most, if not all, of his games (Andy Warhol, his apparent favorite, springs up everywhere—in HackMaster, Nitro placed him as the primary deity of his campaign setting, Kraag Wurld). Has little tolerance for stupidity and sucking up (usually done at the same time by Newt), and can quickly slip into a drill sergeant-esque tirade that would make R. Lee Ermey proud. Nitro was supposedly based on a real person who Jolly met at a gaming club, who really was nicknamed Nitro.
- Pete Ashton: Known to the gaming community as "Weird Pete"; owner of the local game shop, the "Games Pit" (originally called the "Games Pit Stop"). A player in the Black Hands, although he has occasionally acted as GM for both them and other groups in the comic, usually running his trademark "never-completed" adventure The Temple of Horrendous Doom (a reference of a pair of real D&D modules, Tomb of Horrors and The Temple of Elemental Evil) which "no-one has ever completed without dying". In fact, the majority of the adventure requires players to take control of disembodied spirits; thus "dying" and being reborn is part and parcel of completing the adventure. Weird Pete generally forces players to sign a non-disclosure contract before playing as he enjoys the mystique that has evolved around the adventure. Weird Pete also devised a "demerit" system for penalizing players when he is GMing, which can be worked off with time running the front counter of the "Games Pit".

Weird Pete is a ruthless salesman and has no qualms about feeding his friends and customers a line of bull about the virtues of his wares; he has a particular talent for convincing B.A. that a given product or service is just what B.A. needs for his game. However, Pete is also a poor businessman, willing to shell out for whatever seems to be "the next big thing" and taking the fall when the product flops; he is often as vulnerable to the sales pitches of game manufacturers as his customers are to his own "salesmanship".

- Newt Forager: A small and rather whiny and tricky player who invariably plays evil, mysterious loners with hidden agendas, all of whom are blood related so that he can share in-game information between them. The only child of a career military family, Newt bounced from base to base while he was young—perhaps the reason he has a hard time making friends. He has gravitated to the Black Hands because no other group will let him in (he played once with B.A. and the Knights when Bob was unable to game, and proceeded to try and rob everybody just to load up on treasure and experience for another GM's game he was aiming for). Since joining the Black Hands he has acquired an ongoing hatred of Stevil, mostly due to in-game interpersonal warfare and vendettas. Newt's first appearances with the Black Hands were initially believed to be examples of "newbie-bashing" (mistreatment of players who are new to a game or group, and are thus at a disadvantage) by several KODT readers; however, the creators behind the Knights point out that Newt's anti-social and selfish tendencies both in and out of character put him on an even footing with the Black Hands from the start, and that sooner or later, Newt invariably gives as good as he gets where his fellow players are concerned.
- Gordo Sheckberry: A more roleplay focused player who usually plays female characters, most notably female pixie fairies who are dramatically underpowered compared to the other characters in the campaign. Gordo uses a wheelchair and has full lifetime disability, but considers this a bonus as it enables him to game almost daily with different groups. He is easily recognized by his Coke-bottle glasses and bad toupee. Gordo has a degree in chemical engineering, and is rumored to have cooked up the batch of C-4 used in an attempt to breach the steam tunnels (the incident that gave Nitro his nickname).
- Stevil Van Hostle: Also known as Stevil Van Hostile, Evil Stevil or Bitter Stevil, Stevil is a tech-support worker who commutes from Indianapolis to game sessions and is quick and vicious to jump on any grudge in the game (sometimes accompanied by his signature gripe, "I can't believe I drove forty-five frickin' miles for THIS!"). On occasions, he has been known to deliberately trash entire parties and campaigns simply because another player's character won over on him. He has an ongoing grudge against Newt which started when Newt first joined the group; Stevil's character challenged Newt's to "swing at him with a stick" to test his combat prowess (after Newt refused to describe his character in game-statistic terms). Newt's character knocked out Stevil's with his first blow and it was discovered that Stevil had assumed that a "stick" would be a small twig or similar, whereas the "stick" Newt's character had actually used was a full-length pole resembling a log. Outside the Black Hands' table, Newt merely brags he knocked Stevil out with an ordinary stick, which only serves to further annoy Stevil.

=== Hard Eight Enterprises ===
In the KODT world, Hard Eight Enterprises are the creators of the Hackmaster, Cattlepunk, Space Hack, and Scream of Kachooloo gaming systems. Well respected (usually) by all of Muncie's gaming groups, Hard Eight Enterprises run the tournament-level Hackmaster games in the semi-finals, which one year resulted in the disqualification of the Black Hands and the Untouchable Trio (Plus One), causing Timmy Jackson to cry. Hard Eight runs the annual Garycon game convention; there is now a real-world convention with this name, held in memory of Gary Gygax in Lake Geneva, Wisconsin.

- Gary Jackson – President and founder of Hard Eight, Gary Jackson designed and created Hackmaster (a parody of Dungeons & Dragons). His name combines those of Gary Gygax and Steve Jackson, two noted RPG designers. Gary Jackson has always been two things—first and foremost a gamer, but second and not distantly behind that at all: a business man. Some of Hard 8's best and worst products were the design of Gary, including the One-Legged Dwarf Kits. Gary has a son by the name of Timmy (Timmy Jackson in full), who also is involved in the family business. However, Timmy is somewhat young, and a lot of the ideas he comes up with are met with spite and disgust. Gary Jackson allegedly died in issue #53 in a plane crash. Because of controversy surrounding the new edition of Hackmaster, Brian and Bob got into a vehicle and drove up to Hard Eight to confirm. Despite their shock and horror at his "death," the two rubbed several of their dice on Gary (believed to endow good luck, they in fact cursed the dice). Suddenly, in issue #149, Gary emerged from hiding (after having faked his own death to avoid gambling debts), and started his own game company, purchasing several of his game lines from Hard Eight, now controlled by Heidi. Eventually, he merges his new company with Hard Eight, recombining their old intellectual properties, but must work under Heidi, who still owns it.
- Heidi Jackson – estranged wife of Gary Jackson and owner of a regular publishing company, Paperback Werks, and owner of Hard Eight since the (faked) death of Gary Jackson – although she rarely actually showed up at Hard Eight, instead holding telephone conferences with the staff. Heidi is a hard-nosed businesswoman who cares nothing for games or gamers, and imposed continuously harsher deadlines for Hard Eight to show greater and greater profit margins, having threatened to close down the company more than once if it fails to show sufficient growth. Many of the employees dislike Heidi, but Jo Jo (below) has accepted that her business attitude is only acknowledging and dealing with a weakness that was already there. Heidi began demanding changes in Hackmaster to the point it resembled one of the romance/adventure novels her company publishes. (Some changes suggested by Heidi appear to be not-so-subtle jabs at the then-recent, real-world alterations made to Dungeons & Dragons 4th Edition.) After Heidi sold off several Hard Eight assets to have them purchased secretly by Gary, Gary found that his employees had signed Non-compete clause contracts with Heidi. Gary was able to "charm" Heidi into re-merging the companies.
- Timmy Jackson – Son of Gary and Heidi Jackson. Over the years, Timmy earned the nickname of "Table Happy," because of his munchkin ways. He was also referred to on occasion as "Timmy the Rules Mangler." Timmy was intended to one day inherit Hard Eight. Timmy used to participate in the creation of gaming systems, including Cattlepunk. However, Timmy was a munchkin (i.e. power gamer) and his products had poor reputations. Following the return of Gary Jackson, it has been implied that Timmy has lost interest in role-playing games and has grown into a typical teen jock, more interested in football and girls.
- Jo Jo Zeke – Jo Jo was (until his supposed demise) Gary Jackson's best friend and he assumed daily management of Hard Eight after Gary's "death." Jo Jo was once forced to accompany Timmy Jackson to host a Hackmaster tournament because Gary was busy. In the aftermath, Jo Jo grabbed a then-crying Timmy and retreated back to Hard Eight as fast as possible. Everyone found out why very quickly, for the prize of the tournament turned out to be a $1500 certificate for One-Legged Dwarf Kits and Spelljacked cards. This development enraged even those who had lost the tournament, and a riot broke out. Jo Jo was pressed by the Hard Eight staff to stand up to Heidi Jackson's more ridiculous changes to HackMaster. Jo Jo presented their case and was subsequently fired. He created his own gaming company, but was then brought back on board when Gary returned.

=== Patty's Perpetrators ===
Patty's Perpetrators (Patty's Perps for short) are one of the newest sanctioned groups in Muncie recognized by the HMPA . Patty's Perps have the stigma of being the very bottom of the barrel (i.e. they take in those who no one else will accept, like Crutch).

- Patty Gauzweiller – currently teaches a Kindergarten class in Muncie. She used to belong to the Black Hands before forming Patty's Perpetrators (or more commonly "Patty's Perps"). She often brings her "teaching tools" from her classroom to the gaming table (time outs, for example). Patty used to be in a relationship with Dave. They dated for a number of months before Dave decided to break up with her. In more recent times, after a series of misunderstandings and an eventual co-GM arrangement with B.A. during a massive PvP war at the Knights' table, surprisingly, Patty and B.A. appear to be on the road to an actual relationship.
- Leslie "Crutch" Humphries – Crutch is an ex-con who's gotten two "strikes" and been put on notice. If he commits a crime again, he goes to prison for good. He's often found at Hawg Wallers (though legally he is not allowed to be in bars by the terms of his probation, the police don't usually go to Hawg's). Despite his criminal record, it's apparent to those who know him that he mostly has a good heart. He is a very loyal friend—though he often gets in trouble for his loyalty. Crutch discovered role-playing by accident, when he mistook a game of Cattlepunk the Black Hands were playing in Hawg Wallers for an actual meeting to plan a heist; when he was told the truth, he decided he would like to see how the heist turned out in the game anyway and was hooked on Cattlepunk. However, Crutch also had a social stigma of being cutthroat and was rejected from the Knights, as well as from the Black Hands. He finally found a home with Patty's Perps, although he had to try hard to earn the acceptance and approval of the other players. He has learned much about fantasy role-playing and teamwork with fellow players in his time with the Perps, and in a recent Hackmaster Tournament/Grudge Match, Crutch was the only member of the group to advance to the finals. Moreover, it was his act of self-sacrifice that enabled Sara Felton (another finalist among the three teams that called the Grudge Match) to reach the final goal and win the game. Crutch eventually became an HMA certified gamemaster, drawing on his criminal background to run a surprisingly popular (and extremely lethal) Crime Nation campaign.
- Mona "Mo" Wert – Mona has a lot of time to game since her children are grown up and she received a large inheritance from a great-uncle, as well as her husband's departure. She is proud of "answering to no one" and being a "free spirit". She is honest, blunt, and rather ruthless, but most people still consider her enjoyable to be around. In her spare time she does volunteer work and met Patty working at her kindergarten.
- Eddie "Tank" Ramirez – Eddie acquired the nickname "Tank" in high school as the League Commissioner for his Fantasy Football League. He is very proud of his character – Kraven the Frost Giant thief. He believes he is the only player in the country playing a giant thief, although there are rumors that someone in Belize is playing a Hill Giant assassin. He has assumed the role of Crutch's "tutor", teaching him the intricacies of roleplaying and "playing well with others". As a child, Eddie was extremely shy, and Patty's Perps was the only group that accepted him. Patty has been working on "coaxing him out of his shell" and he started working out at Nitro's gym regularly after she offered in-game incentives for exercising.
- Chad Aguilar – Chad is a graduate student as Ball State University, and working as a disc jockey to get needed money. He's known for having a short temper – he is often sent to Patty's time-out corner, and if he goes out prematurely, he'll lose a level. When he started playing Hackmaster, his age (13) made it difficult to find an accepting group, but he was accepted in Patty's group. He plays now with his love interest, Reese, who is a naive vegan peacenik completely unsuited for the brutal world of Hackmaster. After having a baby son ("Peeta...") they ended up sharing a pixie fairy character with multiple personalities.

=== Other groups ===
The Dorm Troopers, Logan's Heroes and Slacker's Hackers are part of some of the other local gaming groups across whom the Knights come at intervals, most notably in the incident of the Player Exchange Program (and resulting intergroup grudge match). In this, certain Game Masters conspired to arrange for the annihilation of competing groups' characters (so that their bodies could be looted for plunder) by switching players into other groups' games where, separated from their regular comrades, they could be killed off. The ultimate plan was to eliminate competition in an upcoming local HackMaster tournament, as well as use any magic items and other enhancements looted from other characters to win the tourney.

=== Other notable characters from the Muncie gaming community include ===
- Bridgette Keating, a beautiful woman who wears skimpy costumes at conventions and delights in using her appearance to manipulate the "geeks" (not least by involving them in the LARP "Vampyres: Lords of Darkness" and then using them for manual labor).
- Earl Slackmozer, an occasional freelancer for Hard Eight Enterprises and a one-time rival of B.A. B.A. didn't care for one of Earl's modules and the two butted heads for a while, but have since learned to respect each other (more or less).
- Sheila Horowitz was introduced to gaming at the Knights' table (though never became an official member of the group) while dating Dave Bozwell, and once got in a fistfight with B.A. when he accused her of in-game cheating. She is currently a member of the Dorm Troopers, and is cohabitating with Bob Herzog. Sheila is arguably a vital part of Bob's maintaining his independence from his father, as she initially took something of a "mother hen" attitude with Bob. Since moving in together, it is clear that Sheila is the dominant personality in the relationship, limiting Bob's spending money and assigning him household chores (although, also, at the latest GaryCon, covertly arranging for Bob to fulfill his ambition to win a giant D20, even if she did then have to manipulate him into not displaying it on a table where she kept a family photograph). This relationship took a dramatic nosedive after Bob got suckered into a couple of Brian's schemes to 'get one over' on Hard 8, culminating in Bob losing Sheila's trust over rent money spent on Hacker-Snacks.
- Hunter and Croix are Bob Herzog's nephew and niece (respectively), whom he has introduced to gaming. Hunter was part of Nitro's PeeWee team that competed in HackMaster tournaments, and later appeared in Wave 1 of Bob Herzog's intercampaign invasion during the PvP war against Carvin' Marvin, Brian, and Sara.

Two fictional groups that are frequently referenced in stories are the Hackmaster Association for gamemasters (HMA) and Hackmaster Players' Association for players (HMPA). They act as networking organizations for the two types of participant, perform lobbying activities on behalf of their groups to Hard Eight Enterprises (e.g., to advocate for rule changes that benefit their members), arbitrate disputes, and issue rulings that are binding on their members. The HMA also serves as an accreditation body for gamemasters. The HMA and HMPA are examples of the exaggerated level of organization of the RPG hobby in the comic; another is the fictional Gamer Temps company that provides, for a fee, drop-in temporary players for campaigns when a regular player is absent (minor character Ty Ferfel was introduced as a Gamer Temps employee).

=== Miscellaneous characters ===
Characters who are not part of a gaming group.

- Squirrely – Weird Pete's pet chimpanzee, he can be considered a security measure. Squirrely is actually a hyper-intelligent experimental animal formerly of a U.S. Government research facility; how he escaped is somewhat of a mystery, and one Weird Pete will likely never solve- mainly because he doesn't know or even care. He works as sort of a gofer at the Games Pit, running errands on his scooter or sorting inventory. He has, on occasions, sat in at the Knights' table, substituting for one of the regulars (though never (so far) for Sara or Brian). He tends to do very well, because Weird Pete keeps his cage in the room he lets gamers hire for sessions, so Squirrely (who games as "Squire Lee", a name Pete had also used to apply for a credit card) has seen most of the commercial modules played already, and knows where the treasure, monsters and traps are. Squirrely is also a rather heavy smoker—something that can create friction at the Knights' table, due to Brian's bad reactions (either physically or psychosomatically allergic) to cigarette smoke.
- Erik Bouchard – A Canadian gamer who showed up at Gary Jackson's funeral and rubbed dice on Gary, right in front of the entire Hard 8 Staff. He later appeared as a "hired gun" during the grudge match that resulted from the Player Exchange Program.

=== In-game (non-player) characters ===
The Knights themselves have encountered several recurring non-player characters in their (various) roleplaying campaigns. Among these are:

- (Li'l) Knobby Foot, the Untouchable Trio (Plus One)'s one-time loyal halfling torch-bearer, who fled with certain of the UT+1's possessions, including Knuckles' "dwarven warhorse" and El Ravager's "magic cow," when the group was in dire straits and Knuckles, El Ravager, and Teflon Billy decided to use Knobby Foot as food. They also once shaved his head and branded "slacker" on his forehead for falling asleep on guard duty. He defected to Sergeant Barringer during the Bag Wars, and later inherited his position as lord of Barringer City. He eventually became a sort of lich and served a villainous role during a major campaign to destroy Bag World.
- Lord Gilead, formerly the henchman of one of Sara's HackMaster characters who became a charismatic noble lord after an unknown, potentially dangerous magical helmet which the Knights insisted that he should be the one to try out turned out to be the legendary Helm of Lordship. He now rules the land of Faengerie and looks down on the propensity of Teflon Billy, Knuckles and El Ravager to burn and slaughter their way through whatever kingdom they happen to be in. Gilead is known to be a "favored NPC" by B.A., who uses him as to foil many of the players' more absurd large-scale plans and actions.
- Chelsie the Magic Cow, once owned by El Ravager and subsequently eaten by Li'l Knobby Foot. Originally she was an ordinary cow, grazing by the side of the road as mere flavor text. El Ravager insisted on investigating, and B.A.'s attempts dissuade them were met with more fervor and suspicion ("there must be something really special about that cow if he's trying to keep us away from it"). When Teflon Billy used Detect Magic on the cow, B.A. sarcastically declared that it radiated a blinding magical aura. El Ravager laid claim to the cow, named her Chelsie, and over the course of several adventures sought to determine her supposed magic abilities; sadly, he never succeeded. Poor Chelsie met her end as a meal and warm clothing for Li'l Knobby Foot when he fled for his life from the Untouchable Trio. There is a similar story regarding Knuckles and a mule, though that was a case of deliberate trickery on the GM's part; B.A. convinced Knuckles (Bob's player) that "Little Mike" was actually a dwarven warhorse. Mike was also stolen by Knobby Foot, but was kept on as the former hireling's steed when Knobby Foot joined the Barringer rebellion. (Oddly enough, when KenzerCo published the actual rulebooks for HackMaster, the dwarven warhorse showed up on the equipment lists of the Player's Guide, along with a plethora of other items mentioned in the comic. However, it contains no references to magic cows, so Chelsie's special abilities remain a mystery.)
- "Red" Gurdy Pickens, most often a bar-owner or piano player and nemesis of the Knights' Cattlepunk characters. From the players' perspective, the most feared of all of B.A.'s recurring NPCs; he is often recognized by description before being mentioned by name, eliciting a cry from the players (in unison) of "RED GURDY PICKENS?!". A Canadian descendant of Red even showed up in B.A.'s Hacknoia campaign to plague the Knights' agent characters. He was Resurrected yet again as the sheriff (and primary antagonist for the players) of the town of Lazarus, during Brian's Cattlepunk campaign. Red Gurdy Pickens appears as an NPC in Aces and Eights, the real-life analogue to Cattlepunk.
- Alexis Marie (a.k.a. Lexie), supposedly Brian's girlfriend, but never seen by anyone else in the flesh. He talked about her larger-than-life adventures and careers for over two years before Bob and the other Knights decided the ruse was out of control; Brian had claimed they were engaged and even sent out wedding invitations. After a long, drawn-out intervention-type discussion, Brian was forced to admit that Alexis was not real. In a dramatic emotional outburst, he confessed he had created his own fantasy world, "Brian's Life", in order that he could feel loved (a sort of escape from the 'harsh edges' of the real world). Alexis is now a touchy subject among all the Knights, and any mention of her at the table tends to result in Brian unleashing a furious beatdown on the person who mentioned her.
- Jonid Coincrawler, a gnomish thief and illusionist, who devises elaborate schemes to separate the Knights from their gold. In many cases, these schemes would not have worked as well as they did if it were not for the Knights simultaneously attempting an equally elaborate scheme to profit from a situation. In the "reality" of the comic strip, Jonid seems to be an established character from official HackMaster material rather than an original creation of B.A.'s, as he is mentioned in documents distributed by Hard Eight Enterprises.
- Sergeant Barringer, the leader of a group of hirelings that the UT+1 placed inside a magical bag of holding in order to transport them more easily (in other words, less expensively than buying them all horses). After Teflon Billy, who was in charge of the bag, forgot to feed the hirelings or let them out of the bag for several months, he was shocked to discover that, rather than dying, they had created a fortress and society within "Bag World", living off the other resources that the Knights had stored there. This led to a conflict and eventually to several full-scale "Bag Wars" in which the Knights attempted to reclaim their items. In a more recent storyline, a campaign taking place generations after the end of the "Bag Wars" features the Knights' current characters entering Bag World and encountering societies descended from veterans of the wars; one of these settlements was "Barringer City," ruled by a corrupted Knobby Foot.
- "Carvin' Marvin", an intelligent artifact-level magic sword who is completely insane and delights in having his wielder kill and maim anyone nearby and/or themselves. On occasion, however, he can be persuaded to pursue a more useful goal, and on those occasions serves as a very powerful and effective weapon. The last time Marvin was wielded resulted in a clash between him and Tremble, the Hackmaster +12 that (played by Nitro) had asserted control over Dave's character, with the result that every PC died and Marvin absorbed Tremble's power as his own. He waited centuries at 'Meatgrinder Rock,' luring in unsuspecting treasure hunters in and destroying them to create bodies for a mighty undead army. Eventually, the party returned to investigate the sword and Sara and Brian's characters got too close and became dominated by Marvin, who then used them to launch a campaign to conquer Garweeze World.
- Pit bulls. The UT+1 discovered that the HackMaster rules allowed pit bulls to be purchased in large quantities from even the smallest village, making them a cheap but effective weapon en masse (though somewhat uncontrollable, since the cheap price was for untrained dogs). Unfortunately, when one of Sara's characters purchased a large group to run off guards transporting the other three player characters to justice, the dogs became feral and started gathering up every other pit bull in the country, one village at a time, until a vast pack of the dogs ('the Doomsday Pack') was killing everyone and every living thing which they came across, changing the face of Garweeze World.

== Fictional games ==
Since the comic centers around a community of role-playing gamers, the characters are seen playing many games that are analogues of real-world games (some of which were then published as real-world games). They include:

- Hackmaster, a fantasy role-playing game like Dungeons & Dragons, but even more baroquely complex. Hackmaster games are typically set in Garweeze Wurld, a reference to Gary Gygax's World of Greyhawk campaign setting. It is the game most often shown being played. Kenzer and Company has published multiple real-world versions of the game, including supplements with names taken from the comic (e.g. the Hacklopedia of Beasts guides to the monsters of Garweeze Wurld). In the very early Shadis scripts, the game the group plays is apparently called Dung & Dragons (although this is only seen on the back of B.A.'s GM screen). HackMaster is initially described as a home-brewed rule set by B.A., but was later declared to be a published product.
- Spacehack, a science-fiction role-playing game like Traveller. Early strips implied this to be exactly the same game as HackMaster with different names, but it diverged later. One early storyline features the Knights' Spacehack characters traveling through a rift in space to Garweeze Wurld, where they encountered their Hackmaster characters. Several single-frame strips referring to SpaceHack were originally advertisement strips for the sci-fi RPG Fading Suns (which otherwise has no relationship to Hackmaster)
- Scream of Kachooloo, a horror role-playing game closely modeled on Call of Cthulhu.
- HackNoia, a modern-day espionage role-playing game like TSR's Top Secret.
- Heroes and Zeroes, a superhero role-playing game like Champions.
- Cattlepunk, a Western role-playing game like TSR's Boot Hill. The earliest strips call it Hackmaster: Cattlepunk, implying it may be a supplement or variation on that game. Kenzer and Company has published its own Western-themed game named Aces & Eights: Shattered Frontier.
- Crime Nation, a role-playing game where the characters are gang members in a crime-ridden city.
- Dawg: The RPG, a role-playing game, designed by B.A. Felton, where the characters are dogs of various breeds, similar to Bunnies & Burrows, which featured rabbit characters. Was self-published by B.A. and was a disastrous failure; the one time the group played it, the session consisted almost entirely of making "saving throws versus Canine Compulsion" to avoid their character acting like an actual dog. Was later picked up by Hard Eight after an intellectual property dispute with Heidi and "tidied up" by Jo Jo Zeke.
- Vampyres: Lords of Darkness, a live-action role-playing game like White Wolf's Vampire: The Masquerade.
- World of Hackcraft, a massively multiplayer on-line role-playing game set in Garweeze Wurld, modeled on World of Warcraft.
- Spelljacked, a fantasy-themed collectible card game like Magic: The Gathering and Spellfire. Spelljacked is depicted as Hard Eight's failed attempt to cash in on the CCG craze; they were later forced to practically give away their remaining stocks of cards.
- Fairy Meat, a miniatures game designed by Pete Ashton about cannibalistic fairies. Later published as a real-world game.
- Risque, a board game of world conquest modeled on Risk.
- Island of Kataan, a board game of building and trading modeled on The Settlers of Catan. When the Knights play it, most of them are baffled by its complete lack of rules for combat.
- "TreasonHackers", a RPG that mimics "Paranoia". It only shows up in the animated YouTube videos, and Brain thinks it's a joke due to the high lethality rate.
- RoadHack, a post-apocalypse highway game of car-to-car combat a la The Road Warrior, clearly based on Car Wars.
- The Great War, an extremely detailed simulation of the First World War, costing several hundred dollars. A number of Muncie gamers formed the "Guns of August Society" to purchase and play it; over the years, all except Weird Pete and Brian have dropped out, and those two have been playing the game, at the rate of one turn per month, for fifteen years. When Johnny Kizinski briefly returned to the society, he found that Pete and Brian had stopped attacking each other and were continuing to play the game peacefully simply to keep it running: Johnny attacked, upsetting the balance. A reference to the "monster games" of wargaming's past, such as SPI's War in Europe or GDW's Europa Series.
- Virulence: The Game of Biological Warfare, a boardgame with both cooperative and competitive elements, centered around keeping a patient alive as it is attacked by various diseases while engineering diseases to attack other teams' patients. Similarly themed to the cooperative board game Pandemic.

== Live readings ==
An event held at the Origins Game Fair, and possibly other Gaming conventions, is the Knights Of The Dinner Table live reading. People in attendance will put their name into a random drawing. The "winners" go up on stage, sit around a table, and act out the comic book, with hilarious results.

== Affiliated products ==
Several games based on the comic have been published:

- The boardgame Orcs at the Gates, published in 1998, and an expansion Orcs: The Reckoning in 1999. The base game won the 1999 Origins Award for Best Fantasy or Science Fiction Boardgame.
- The card game Knights of the Dinner Table: HACK!, published in 2001.
- Four Lost Worlds gamebooks were published by Flying Buffalo based on the comic's famous "Untouchable Trio +1" (Bob's "Knuckles", Dave's "El Ravager", Sara's "Thorina", and Brian's "Teflon Billy").
- HackMaster, a real-world realization of the game played in the comic, was published by Kenzer and Company. Based on the first edition of Advanced Dungeons & Dragons (system used under license), it won the Origins Award for Game of the Year 2001.
- In 2000, a monthly spin-off comic was created, titled Knights of the Dinner Table Illustrated, AKA K.ILL. The comic depicts many of the adventures described within KotDT; however, K.ILL shows the player characters' actions rather than those of the players behind them.
- In 2018 a Kickstarted Live action show was produced. However, due to the mismanagement and misdoings of the Originator of the Kickstarter, Ken Whitman, now known as Whit Whitman, the 4TB harddrive with the footage was lost. Thankfully, a portion of the footage was recovered and Ben Dobyns of Zombie Orpheus Entertainment was able to make and send the backers a reconstructed version despite no obligation to do so.

== See also ==
- Dork Tower, another roleplaying comic strip
- Eric and the Dread Gazebo, a notorious gaming anecdote that provided the basis for one story in the comic's first issue.
- Nodwick, another roleplaying comic strip
- The Order of the Stick, another roleplaying comic strip
