= Midnight's Terror =

Midnight's Terror is a 2001 role-playing game adventure published by Kenzer & Company.

== Plot summary ==
Midnight's Terror is an adventure in which the player characters try to find out who stole the Orb of Midnight and why several caravans disappeared.

== Reviews ==
- Pyramid
- Backstab
