= Fairy Meat =

Tabletop game

Fairy Meat is a warband-based tabletop game first published by Kenzer & Company in 2000, written and designed by Sky Leaton and illustrated by Manny Vega. The game revolves around the battles of a pack (Circle) of vicious, cannibal fairies. Gameplay is conducted with 1:1 miniatures and a deck of cards.

== Story ==
Long ago, fairies were peaceful, mischievous, happy-go-lucky creatures who spent most of their time dancing, playing, singing, and eating honey and fruit.

That all changed when a foolish fairy by the name of Merryzot decided to try eating the meat of a dead mouse. The never-before-tasted substance proved addictive, and soon all fairies, being as amoral as they are adventurous, were carving up all manner of flesh to discover the best tasting.

Eventually it was discovered that the best-tasting meat of all was the meat of the fairy, and their society was plunged into chaos as they devoured one another, with the old fairy nobility fleeing to the Moon and the Gnomic races (gnomes, leprechauns etc.) vanishing underground, acts that would come back to haunt the Woodland Fairies later.

Eventually the very essence of Fairydom was altered, and fairies, who spring into being fully grown from pods produced by amber drops in spring, were born addicted and hungering for the flesh of their fellows.

== Races ==
The fairies of Fairy Meat are divided into a variety of sub-breeds, some of which form different Circles than others. The Circles are loyal bands that do not kill or eat their own members. The breeds of fairies are:

=== Base game ===
Woodland Fairies: these are the primary fairies the player uses, all that remains of a once enchanting culture. Divided into several sub-breeds named after various plants, Woodland Fairies are regarded as primitives by other fairy races. Their diet of fairy flesh apparently makes them incredibly strong (by fairy standards).

Glitter Fairies: a sub-breed of Woodland Fairy, these are the descendants of lesser fairy nobility and those fairy sorcerers who survived the downfall of fairy civilisation. In the game, these are weaker than normal Woodland Fairies but make up for by being able to use the Nasty (battle/offensive) and Nice (healing/defensive) branches of fairy magic.

=== Clockwork Stomp ===
Gnomes: After abandoning life alongside ancient humans and going underground to prepare for world domination, the gnomic races eventually fell to infighting, which resulted in the annihilation of all races bar two; the science-loving gnomes and the drunken, undead leprechauns. Gnomes have lost all of their former magical powers, but in return have developed incredible technological skill, including bionic body parts, chemical weapons and rocket launchers. The mad Leprechauns, having become zombies due to an addiction to alchemical shoe polish formula, are apparently easy prey for gnomes, as many gnome inventions are powered by leprechaun brew (blenderized leprechaun). Gnomes as a race seem to suffer from a Napoleon Complex, and are determined to one day conquer the surface. Though slower than fairies, their deadly weaponry and their cyborg slaves (the Clock-Fairies) make them a force to be reckoned with. Their racial enemies are the Gremlins, who live to destroy machinery. Gnomes, Gremlins and Clock-Fairies are detailed in "Clockwork Stomp!", the first supplement for Fairy Meat.

Clock-Fairies: These twisted abominations are created by gnomes. A gnome must first assemble a fairy body of machinery, including rotor-like wings, which serve as a power source. Then he needs to catch a living fairy, cut its head off then graft it to the mechanical body. Though most Clock-Fairies work for gnomes, some do manage to go rogue, joining fairy circles to take revenge on their former masters.

=== Sugar and Vice ===
Moon Fairies: When a mysterious force threatened fairies at the onset of the Dark Ages, the nobility did what they do best - they ran away. In this case, they made it to the Moon before they finally stopped. There, the fairy culture survived and eventually evolved (or degenerated, depending on how you look at it) into a rock-and-roll obsessed civilisation. In recent years, the music-loving Moon Fairies returned to earth, only to find that in their absence the Woodland Fairies had become fierce cannibals, who refused to obey the descendants of the creeps who had left them to rot so long ago. Unable to match the strength that their former minions' cannibalistic diet gave them, the Moon Fairies developed a mystical lipstick called Pink, which allowed them to suck the life from another fairy and thus give them the opportunity to match their degenerate kinsfolk. Moon Fairies make no distinction between fighters and wizards, but their style of magic is different from earth Fae, being divided into Glamour and Glitz branches. Moon Fairies and their Beat Pixie minions are detailed in Sugar and Vice, the second Fairy Meat supplement.

Beat Pixies: Obnoxious things, Beat Pixies are possessed by a natural rhythm, which afflicts them with a kind of hyper-activity. Once they start moving, they can't stop! In Moon Fairy society, Beat Pixies are drummers and front-line warriors, when they aren't dancing crazily in the Mosh Pits.

=== Wicked Things ===
Wicked Things: This title is used to refer to the various types of fairy 'converted' by black witches. Wicked Things consist of Bitter Fairies, who then progress to Gloom Fairies and then to Doom Fairies, the berserk Blood Fairies, devilish Cricken, the filthy and disease-loving Leperchauns (as in leperous Leprechauns), and Night Fairies, which are converted Glitter Fairies who now use all manner of cheesy incantations when they use their magic. Wicked Things are detailed in the sourcebook of the same name, the third supplement to Fairy Meat.

=== WAR ===
Straightedge Rebellion: Regarded as mentally-ill by the other fairies for their lack of happiness and forced to leave, these warlike fairies adopt a militaristic lifestyle. They avoid the entertainment and decorations other fairies use, and many of them also do not eat other fairies' meat, so they instead feed on a freely-given dew that regulates their emotions. Like the Gnomes they use more technologically advanced weapons to kill all other fairies, whom they regard as cannibalistic abominations to be slaughtered. These were introduced in the WAR! supplement.

Feral Queens: Rogue Moon Fairy monarchs who went wild, ruling over tribes of Forest Fairies by threatening to kill and eat them to frighten them into submission.

== Reception ==
The reviewer from Pyramid comments: "The makers of Knights of the Dinner Table bring their sense of humor to the world of fairy-on-fairy battle in Fairy Meat, a fast-playing miniature war game. Designer Sky Leaton has created an entertaining game with easy movement rules, simple magic use, and a combat system that uses regular playing cards instead of dice."

In reviewing Fairy Meat: Sugar and Vice, Jennifer Brozek said "Play this game with great abandon... and the next time your buddy says 'Bite me!,' do it. Happy munching!".

A reviewer from RPGnet said "Despite the wonderfully twisted premise of the game and its colorful components, the game is still quite similar to most miniature games. The gimmick of using cards, in fact, requires players to learn a new set of rules for old combat concepts. At best, the cannibalism and initiative rules are different, but not enough, in my opinion, to recommend this game."

Heather Wilson for the Voice of Youth Advocates said that "Appropriate for an older teen audience, Fairy Meat is another game in which planning and decision-making is key. Its humor also encourages reading for pleasure. Different from most miniature games in presentation and play, the game appeals to those who don't normally play miniatures. I enjoy the way that fairies are presented as vicious, vapid creatures who prefer fighting to flitting."
