= Kingdoms of Kalamar Campaign Setting Sourcebook =

Kingdoms of Kalamar Campaign Setting Sourcebook is a 2001 role-playing game supplement published by Kenzer & Company for Dungeons & Dragons.

== Contents ==
Kingdoms of Kalamar Campaign Setting Sourcebook is a supplement in which a comprehensive guide to Tellene details its regions, peoples, laws, gods, geography, and cultures, complete with maps covering the entire continent.

== Publication history ==
Shannon Appelcline commented that "The Kingdoms of Kalamar line was relaunched was a brand new, hard-cover campaign setting book (2001). It beat Wizards' Forgotten Realms Campaign Setting (2001) and AEG's Rokugan Campaign Setting (2001) to market and thus was the first official third edition campaign setting released. Thanks to its early market position and to that Dungeons & Dragons trademark, the new Kalamar line did much better than its first incarnation had."

== Reviews ==
- Backstab #31
- Realms of Fantasy
- Legions Realm Monthly (Issue 5 - Jan 2003)
- The Guild Companion (Dec 2001)
- Pyramid
