= Aces & Eights: Shattered Frontier =

Tabletop role-playing game

Aces & Eights
Shattered Frontier
- Aces & Eights rulebook cover
- Designers: Jolly R. Blackburn, Brian Jelke, Steve Johansson, Dave Kenzer, Jennifer Kenzer, Mark Plemmons
- Publishers: Kenzer & Company
- Publication: 2007
- Genres: Western, Alternate history
- Systems: Custom
- Website: www.kenzerco.com

Aces & Eights: Shattered Frontier is an American role-playing game, written by Jolly R. Blackburn, Brian Jelke, Steve Johansson, Dave Kenzer, Jennifer Kenzer and Mark Plemmons, and published by Kenzer & Company in 2007. Aces & Eights won the Origins Award Roleplaying Game of the Year 2007, was nominated for four ENnie Awards; Best Production Values, Best Rules, Best Game and Product of the Year, eventually winning the Silver ENnie Award for Best Game. The original hardback edition of the Aces & Eights book has a tooled leather-style cover and consists of 400 full colour pages.

== Setting ==
Aces & Eights is set in an alternate history time line in which the American Civil War happened ten years earlier and the United Kingdom and France assisted the Confederate States of America (CSA). The Civil War lasted for ten years and both sides ground to a halt as resources and manpower started to run low for all concerned. The Republic of Texas never had a chance to join the Union and remains neutral in the war. With the Union tied up in a war of attrition with the CSA, the "Indian Territory", modern-day Oklahoma, was able to form their own government and withdrew from the Union. Mexico still owns much of the modern day Southwestern United States, but does not have the manpower or money to govern it properly.

== Publication history ==
Kenzer & Company first published a set of basic combat rules called Aces & Eights: Showdown in June 2005. Showdown covers just the basic character creation and combat rules of the game along with a few sample scenarios and a map of the fictional towns of Lazarus and Black Horse. Aces & Eights: Shattered Frontier was released in June 2007. It includes all of the rules from Showdown in the basic combat chapter but includes a more detailed character creation and "Advanced Scrapes" chapter along with the expanded Setting and additional rules.
