= Monty Python and the Holy Grail Collectible Card Game =

Collectible card game

- Designers: Brian Jelke
- Publishers: Kenzer & Company
- Players: 2 or more
- Setup time: < 5 minutes
- Playing time: < 60 minutes

Monty Python and the Holy Grail Collectible Card Game is an out-of-print collectible card game (CCG) by Kenzer & Company based on the Monty Python and the Holy Grail movie. Brian Jelke was the designer. It was first released in June 1996 and noted as one of the more popular CCGs at that time due to being based on a movie franchise. The original set had 314 cards plus 4 promo cards based on the Knights of the Dinner Table comic book (which shared publishers with the card game). An expansion called Taunt You a Second Time was released in August 2000 and contained 158 cards plus eight promotional cards again from Knights of the Dinner Table. In 2006, the game was considered a "dead" CCG but with a niche following due to the "hilarious" gameplay in which the rules directed the player to speak in authentic movie accents and similar actions. In 2025 some fans of the game online put together a modernized rulebook which began a mild resurgence in interest in the game.

The game is set during the indeterminate time of Monty Python and the Holy Grail. Each player starts the game by facing off, shaking hands, exchanging pleasantries, and commencing the card game. Each player builds a game state representing their own England out of 12 cards face down from his own deck. Each player supplies two cards to build Avalon which resides in between each player's England, and it represents the goal of the game. A player's knights and pages then carry coconuts through the locales of England and doing battle with other knights and pages along the way. Once at Avalon, they may search for the Holy Grail.
