= Gazebo =

Pavilion structure built in a park or garden

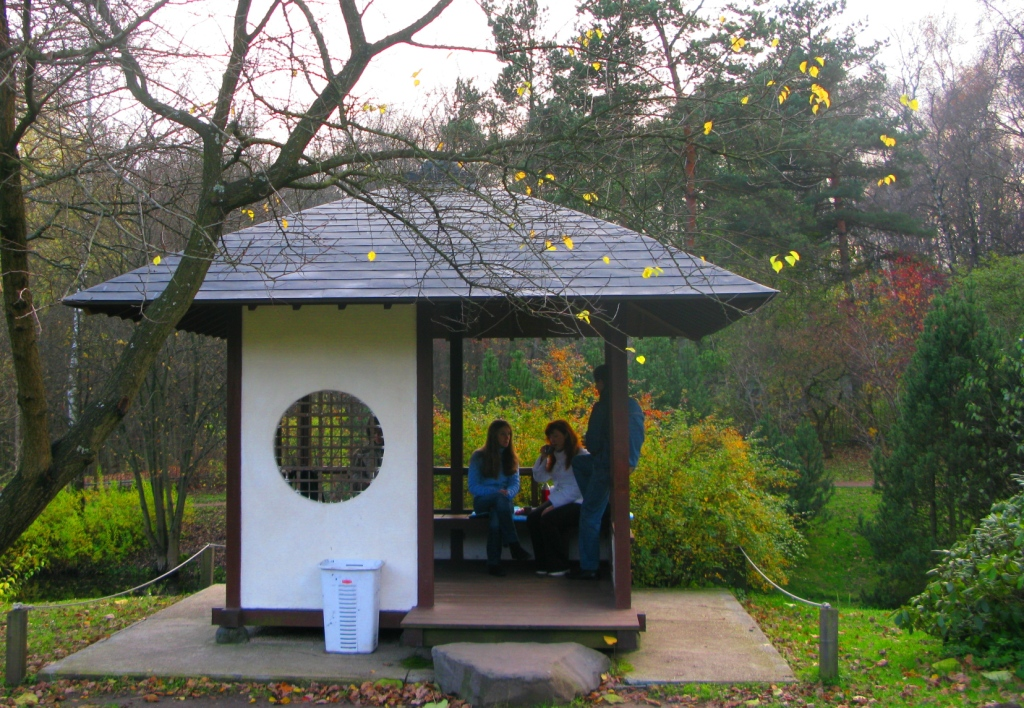
Japanese-style gazebo in the Japanese Garden, Moscow

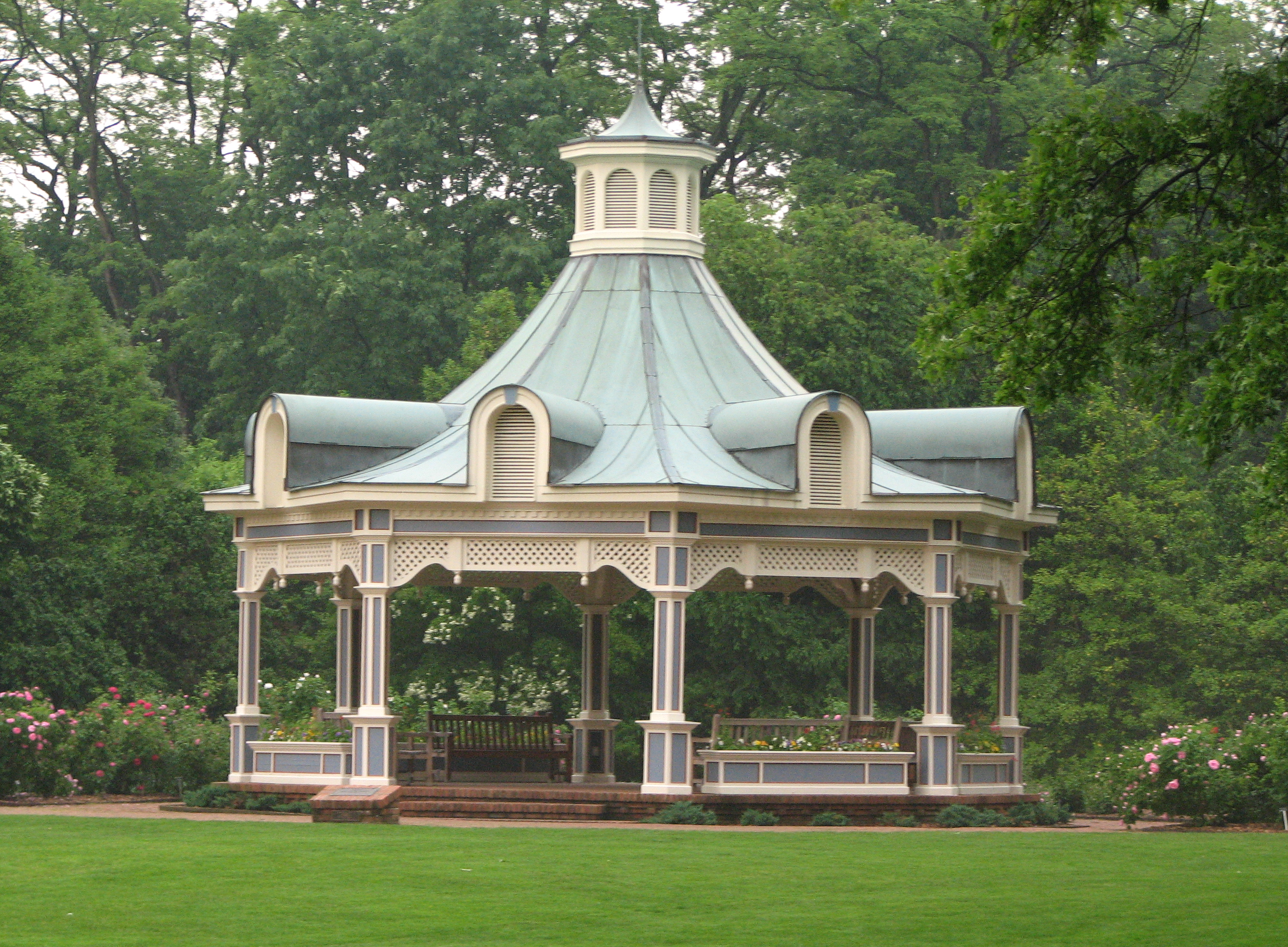
The Victorian-style bandstand gazebo at Fellows Riverside Gardens at Mill Creek Park, Youngstown, Ohio

A gazebo (/ɡəziːboʊ/) is a pavilion structure, sometimes octagonal or turret-shaped, often built in a park, garden, or spacious public area. Some are used on occasions as bandstands.

In British English, the word is also used for a tent-like canopy with open sides to provide shelter from sun and rain at outdoor events.

== Etymology ==
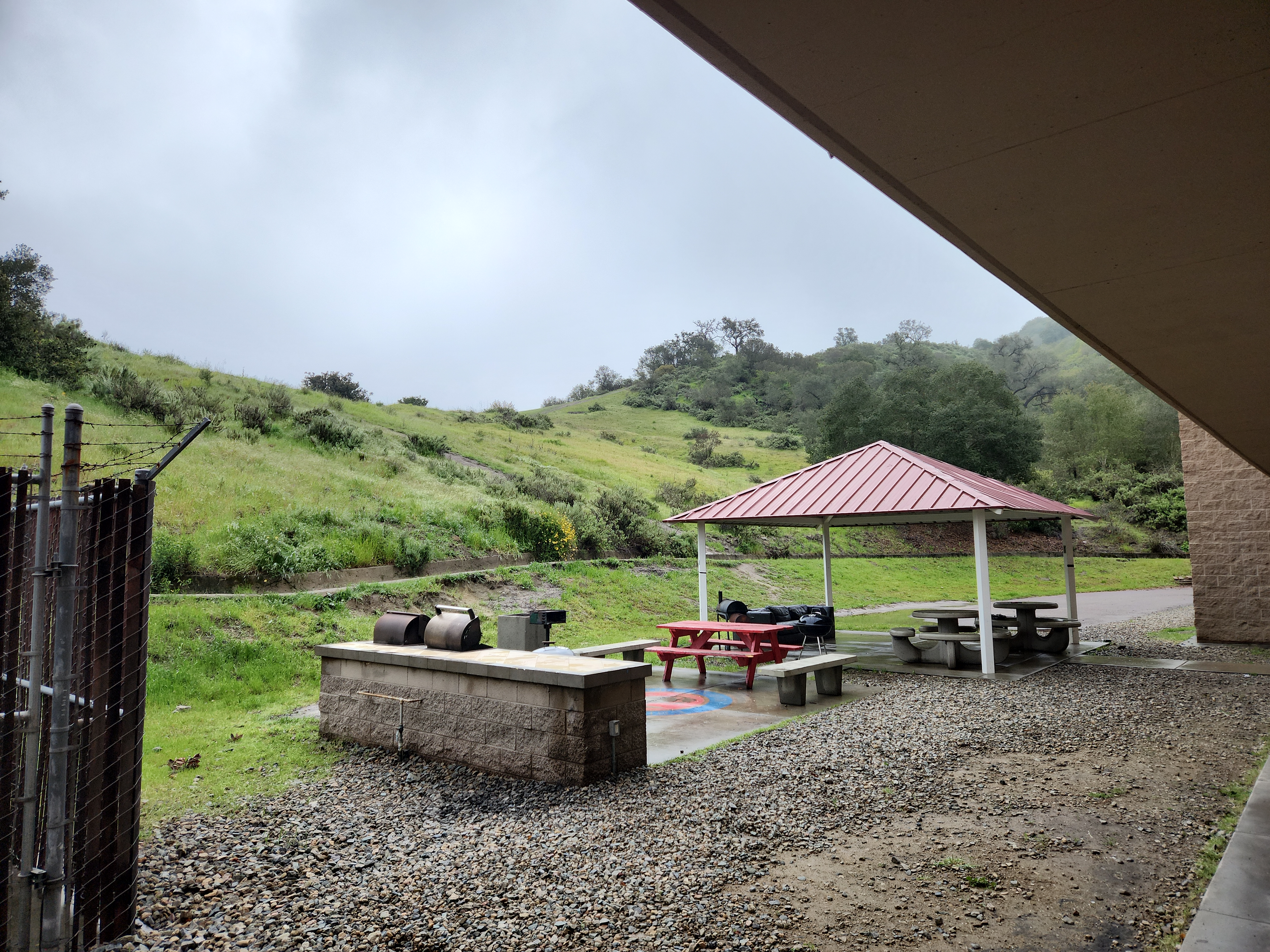
Tent gazebo

The etymology given by Oxford Dictionaries is "Mid 18th century: perhaps humorously from gaze, in imitation of Latin future tenses ending in -ebo: compare with lavabo." L. L. Bacon put forward a derivation from Casbah, a Muslim quarter around the citadel in Algiers. W. Sayers proposed Hispano-Arabic qushaybah, in a poem by Cordoban poet Ibn Quzman (d. 1160). The word gazebo appears in a mid-18th century English book by the architects John and William Halfpenny: Rural Architecture in the Chinese Taste. There Plate 55, "Elevation of a Chinese Gazebo", shows "a Chinese Tower or Gazebo, situated on a Rock, and raised to a considerable Height, and a Gallery round it to render the Prospect more complete."

George Washington had a small eight-sided garden structure at Mount Vernon. Thomas Jefferson wrote about gazebos, then called summerhouses or pavilions.

== Design ==
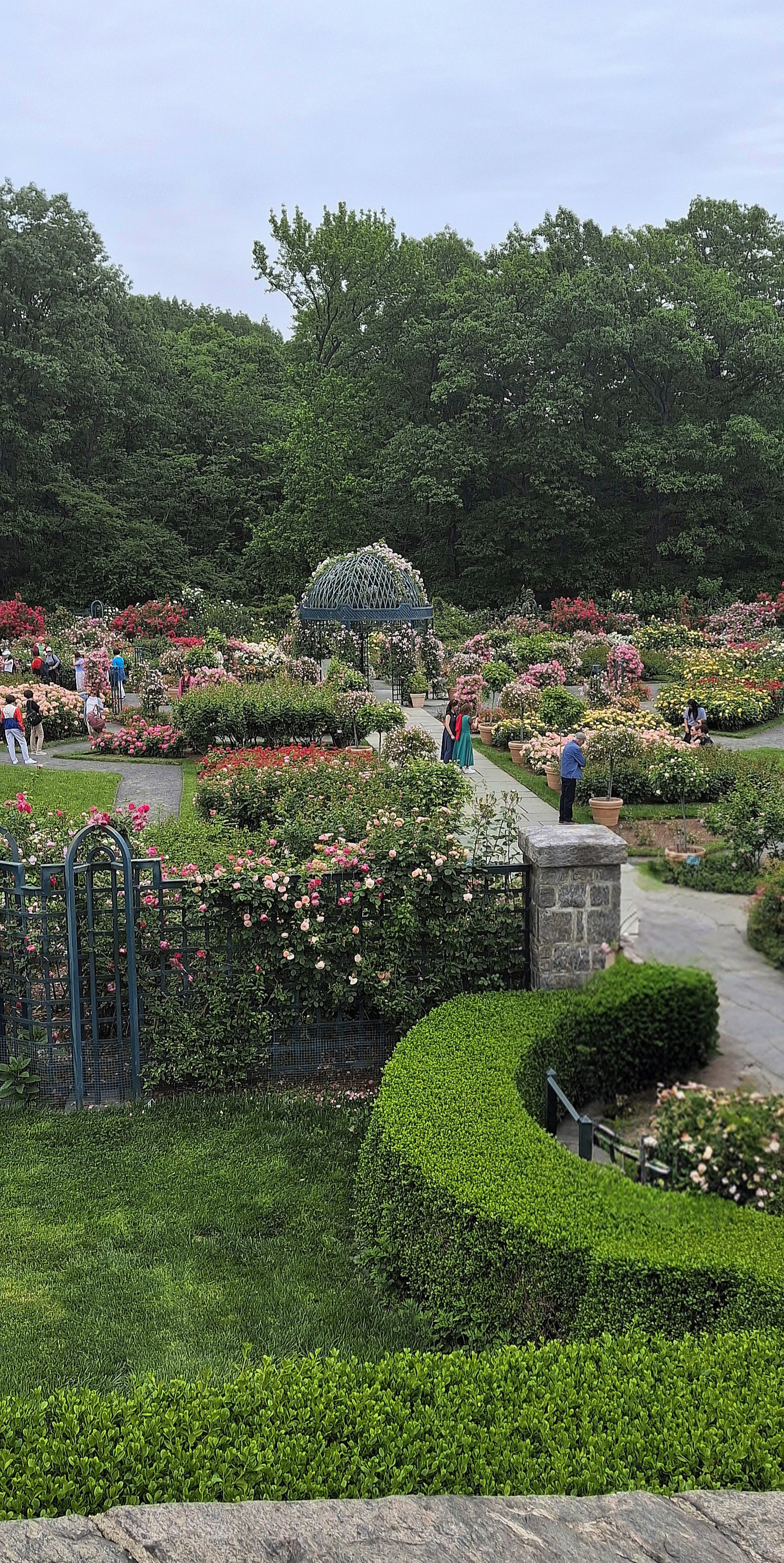
Gazebo is a focal point of the Peggy Rockefeller Rose Garden in the New York Botanical Garden. The garden layout, including the design for an iron-lattice gazebo and surrounding fence, was created by the renowned landscape architect Beatrix Farrand in 1916. Due to iron shortages during World War I, construction of the gazebo and the fence was not completed, and the whole design was later forgotten. In the mid-1980s, Farrand's original plans were rediscovered. David Rockefeller donated $1 million for the completion of Farrand's design, and the garden, including the gazebo and the fence, was finally realized in 1988. It was named the "Peggy Rockefeller Rose Garden" after David's wife and NYBG Board member Margaret "Peggy" McGrath Rockefeller.

Gazebos are freestanding or attached to a garden wall, roofed, and are often open on all sides. They provide shade, shelter from rain and a place to rest, while acting as an ornamental feature. Some gazebos in public parks are large enough to serve as a bandstand.

== Types ==
Gazebos overlap with pavilions, kiosks, belvederes, follies, gloriettes, pergolas, and rotundas.

Such structures first appeared in Egyptian gardens approximately 5,000 years ago and appear in the literature of China, Persia and other classical civilizations.

Examples in England are the garden houses at Montacute House in Somerset. The gazebo at Elton on the Hill in Nottinghamshire, thought to date from the late 18th or early 19th century, is a square, crenelated, brick and stone tower with an arched opening. It acted as a focus for an extensive system of red-brick walled gardens, which has survived with some more modern additions.

In today's England and North America, gazebos are typically built of wood and covered with standard roofing materials, such as shingles. Gazebos can be tent-style structures of poles covered by tensioned fabric. Gazebos may have screens to aid in the exclusion of flying insects.

Temporary gazebos are often set up in the campsites of music festivals in the United Kingdom, Canada and the United States, usually accompanying tents around them.

A structure resembling a gazebo, found in villages in the Maldives, is known as a holhuashi.

== Gallery ==
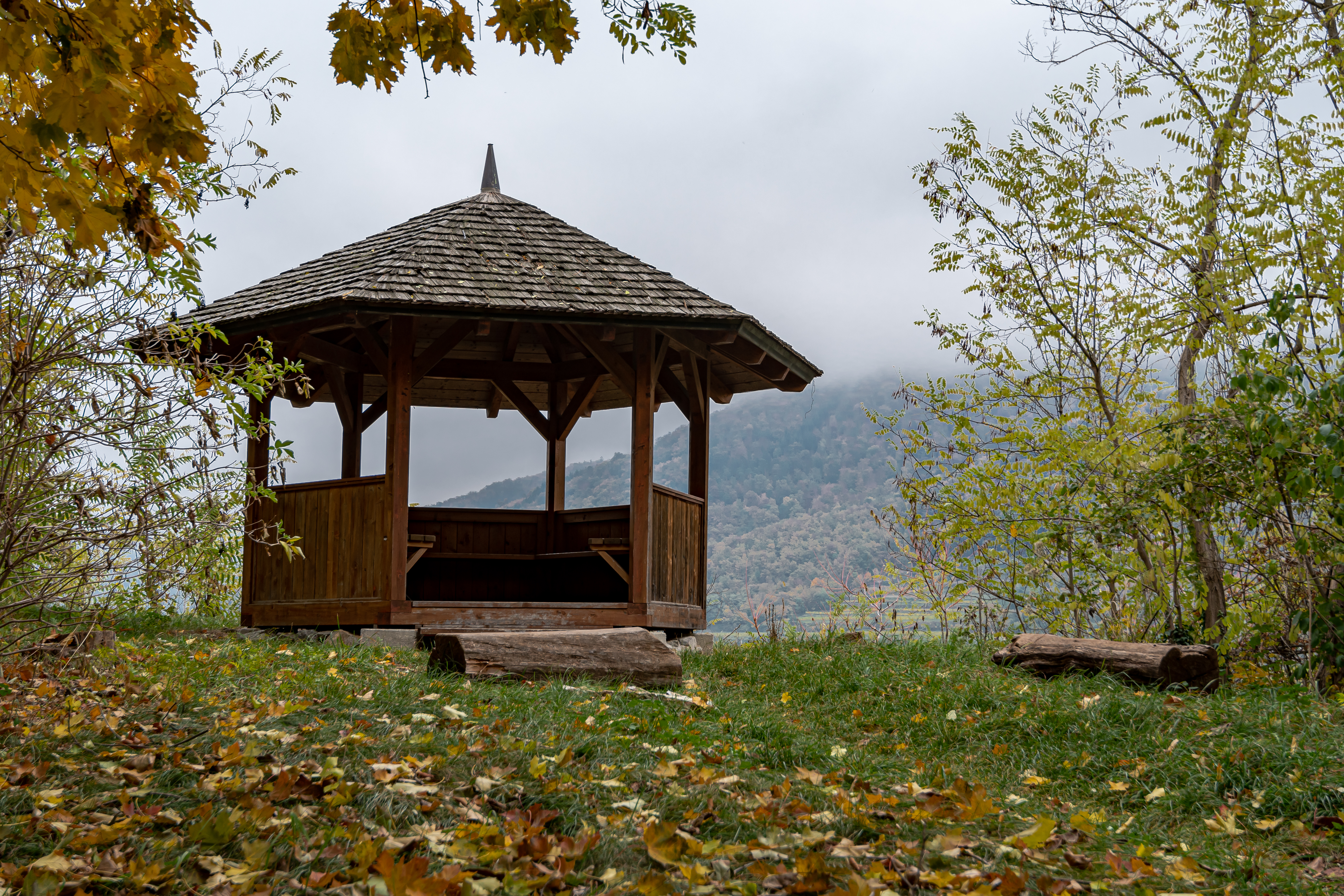
Austria

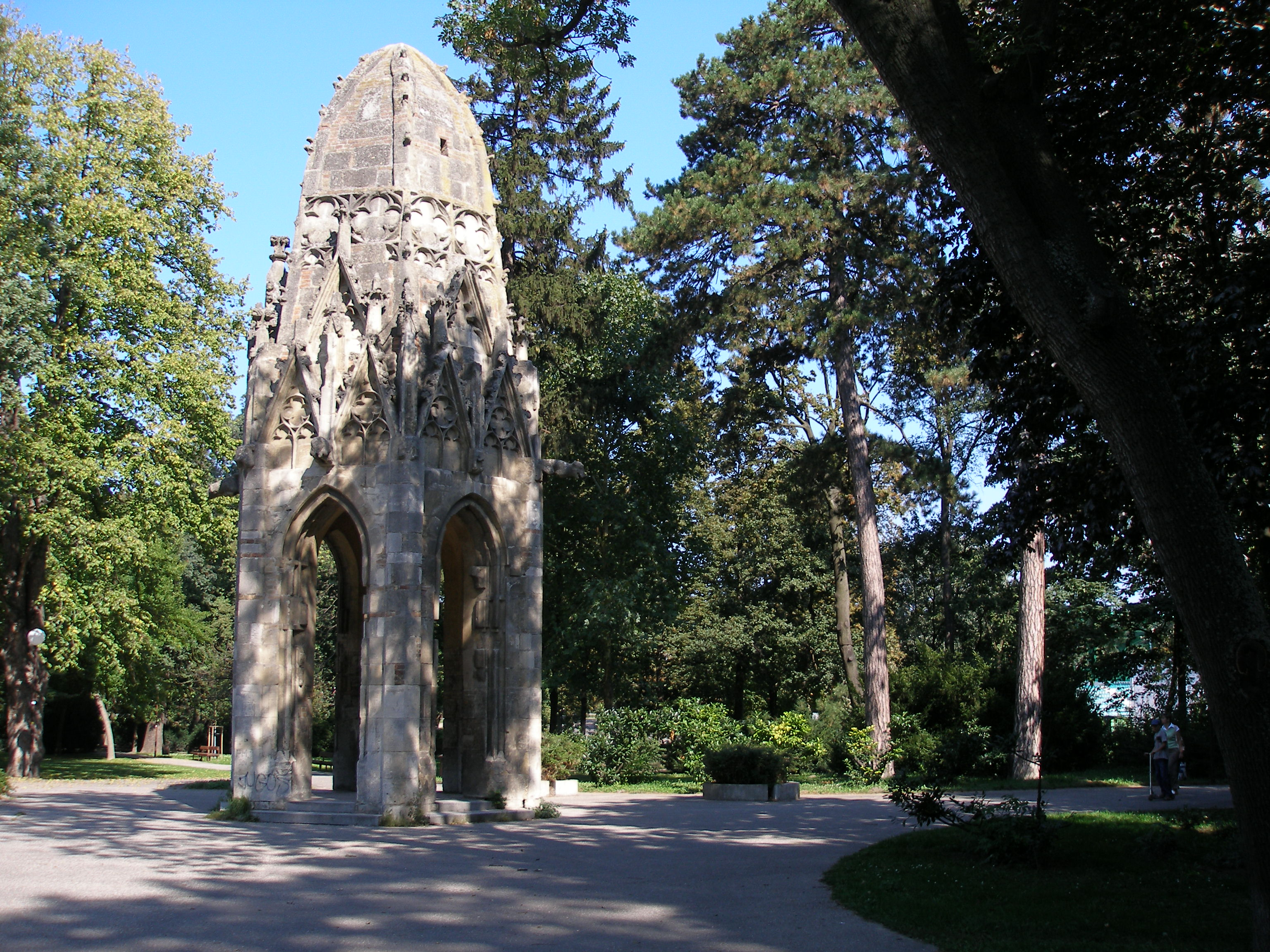
Unique gazebo in Janko Kráľ Park is former gothic tower from the Franciscan church

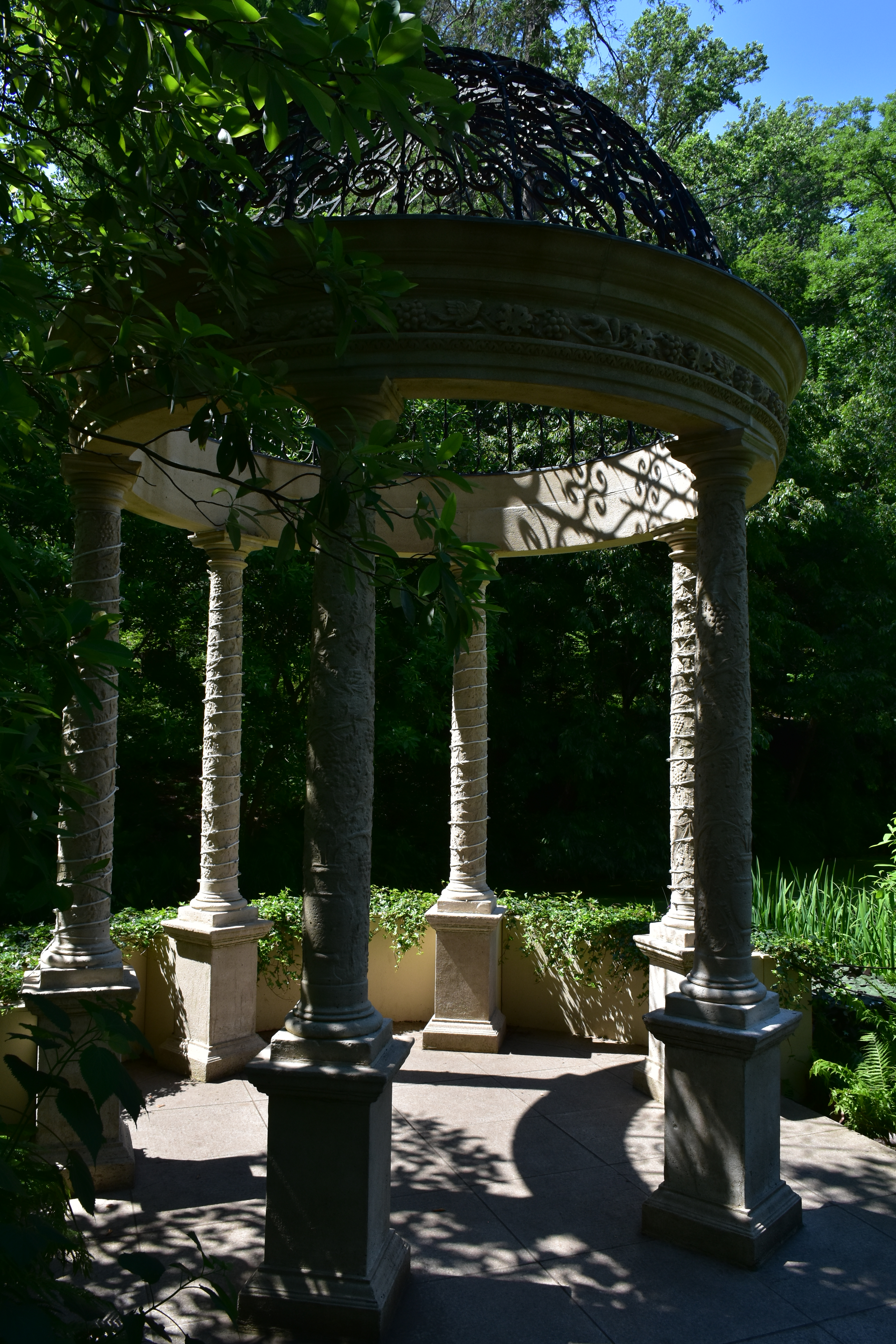
Greek-style gazebo in Longwood Gardens

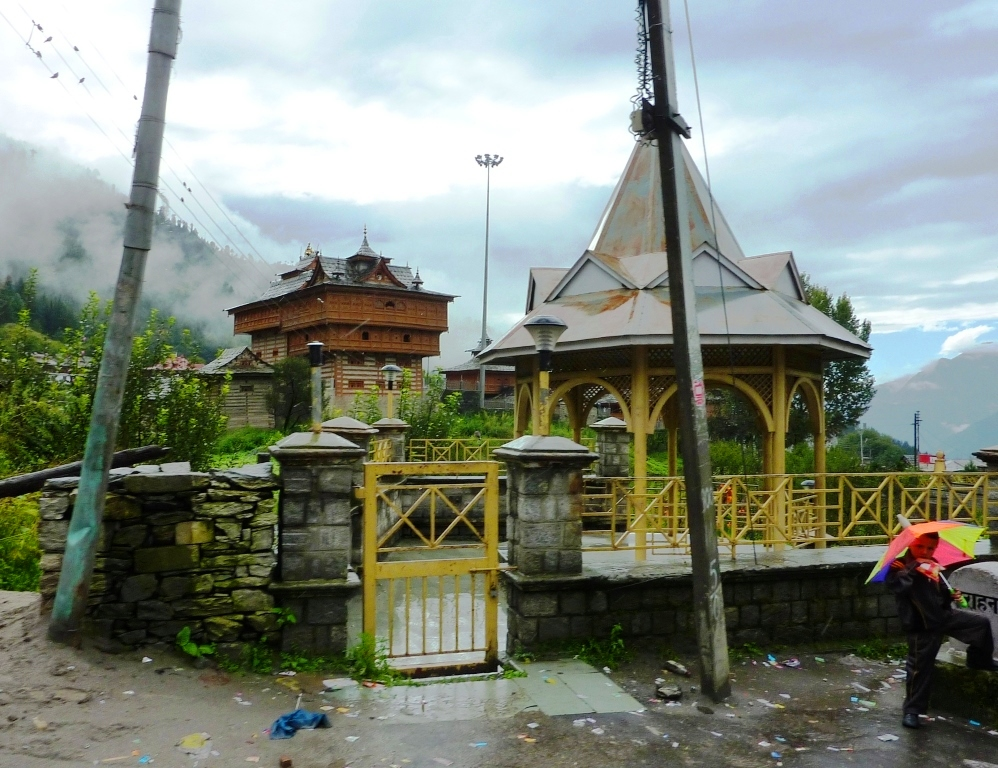
Bandstand at Royal Palace, Sarahan, India

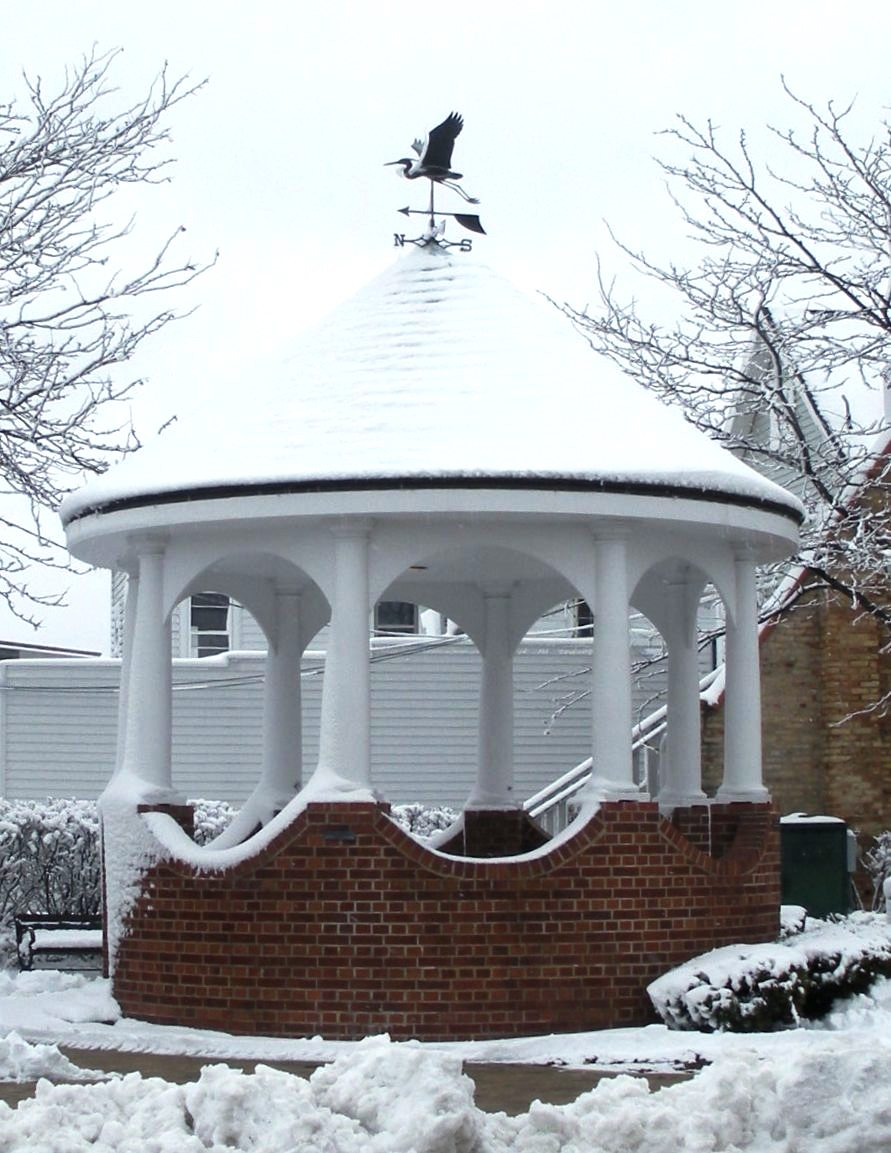
A gazebo during winter, topped with a weather vane

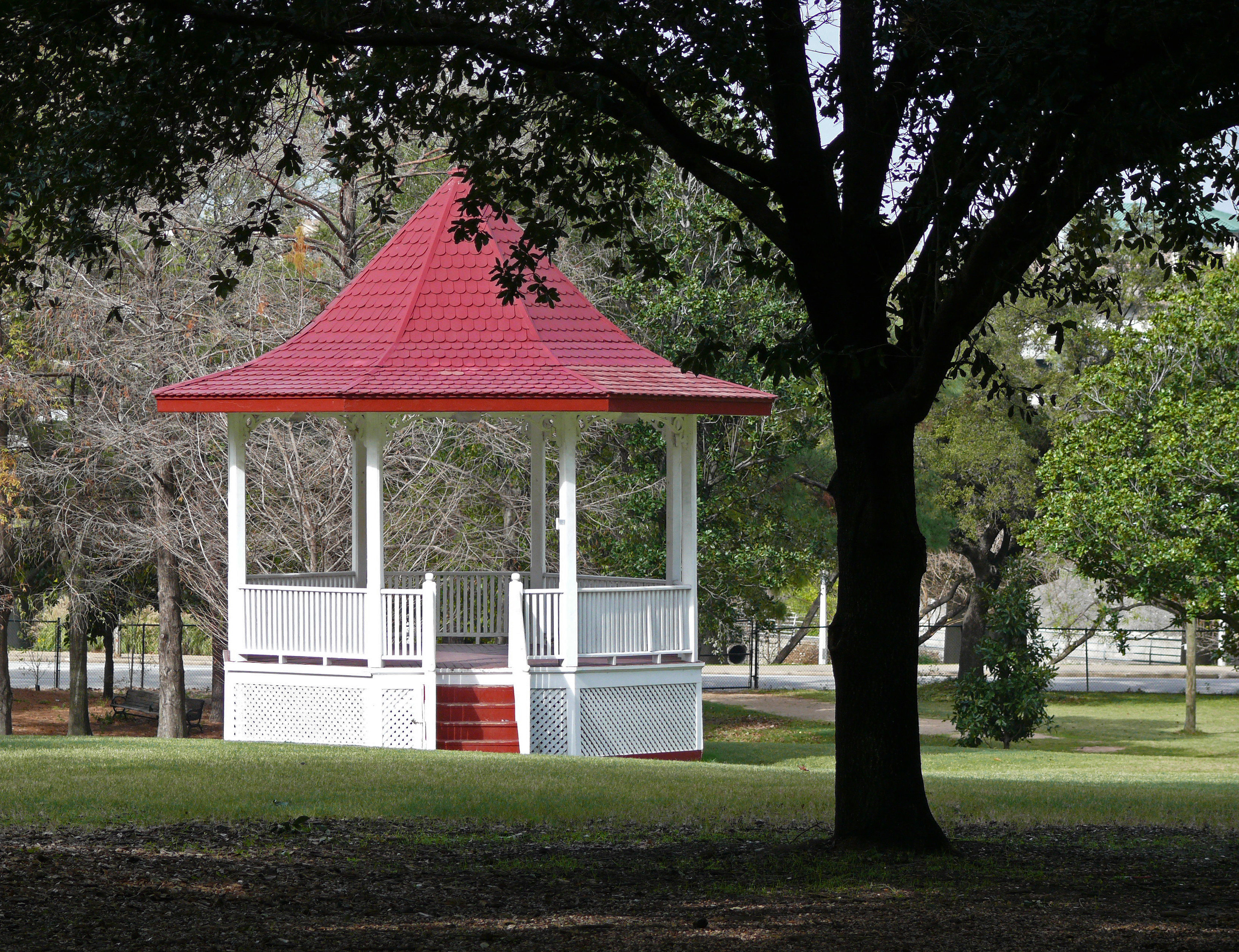
Gazebo in Sam Houston Park, Houston, Texas

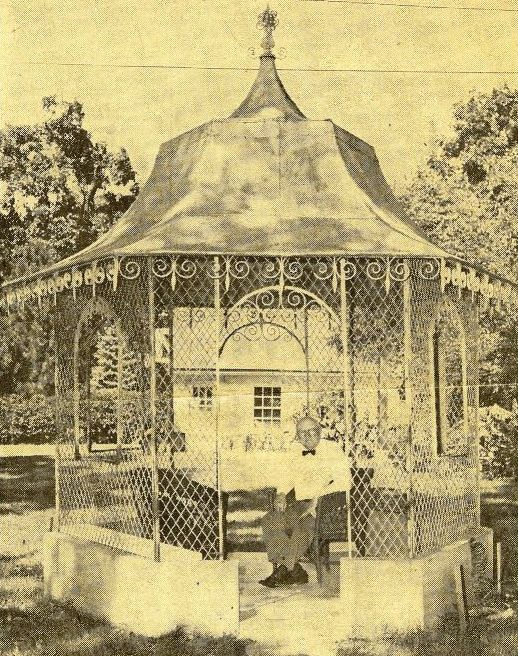
Gazebo, United States, late 19th century

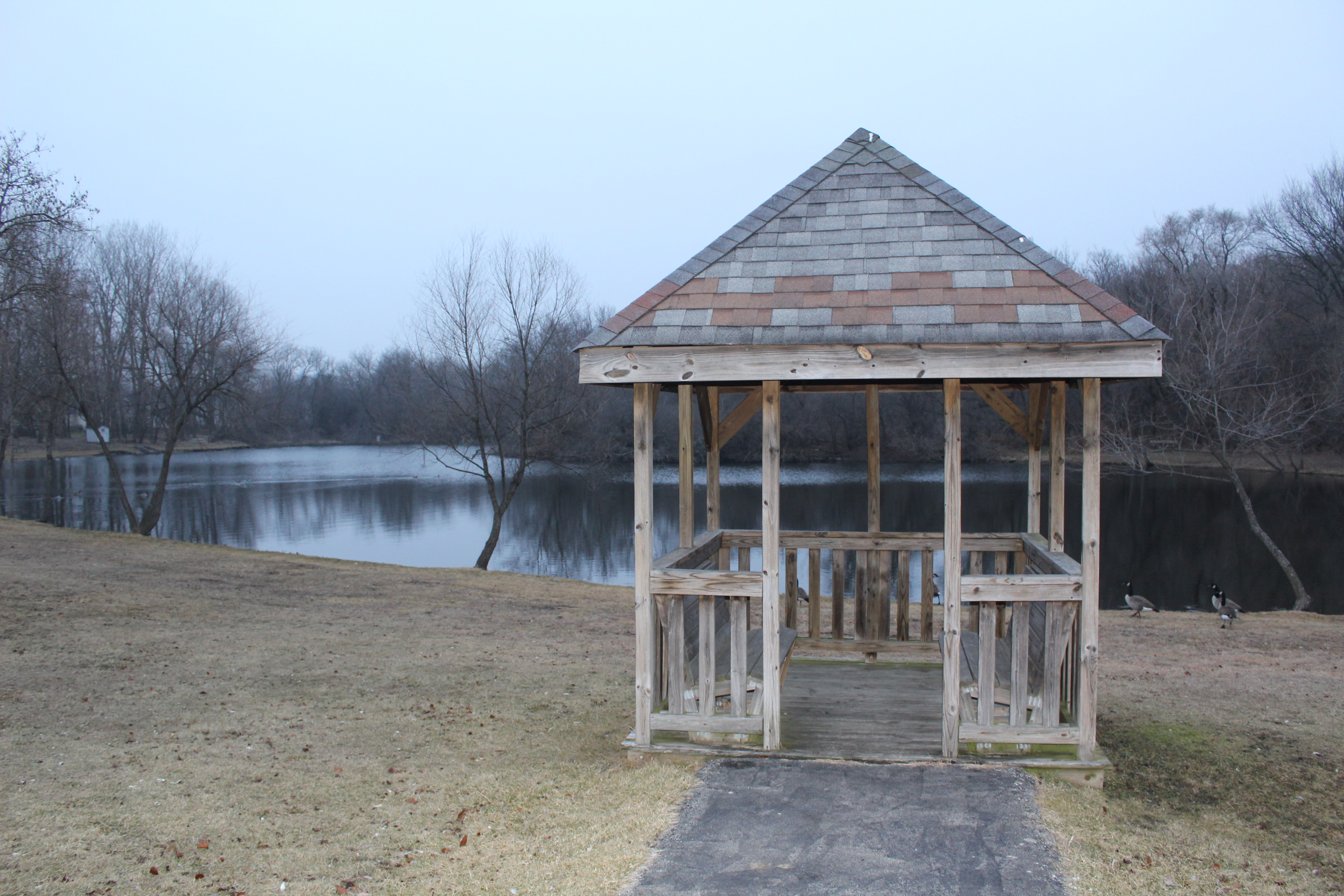
Weathered gazebo near a fishing hole in Fox River Grove, Illinois

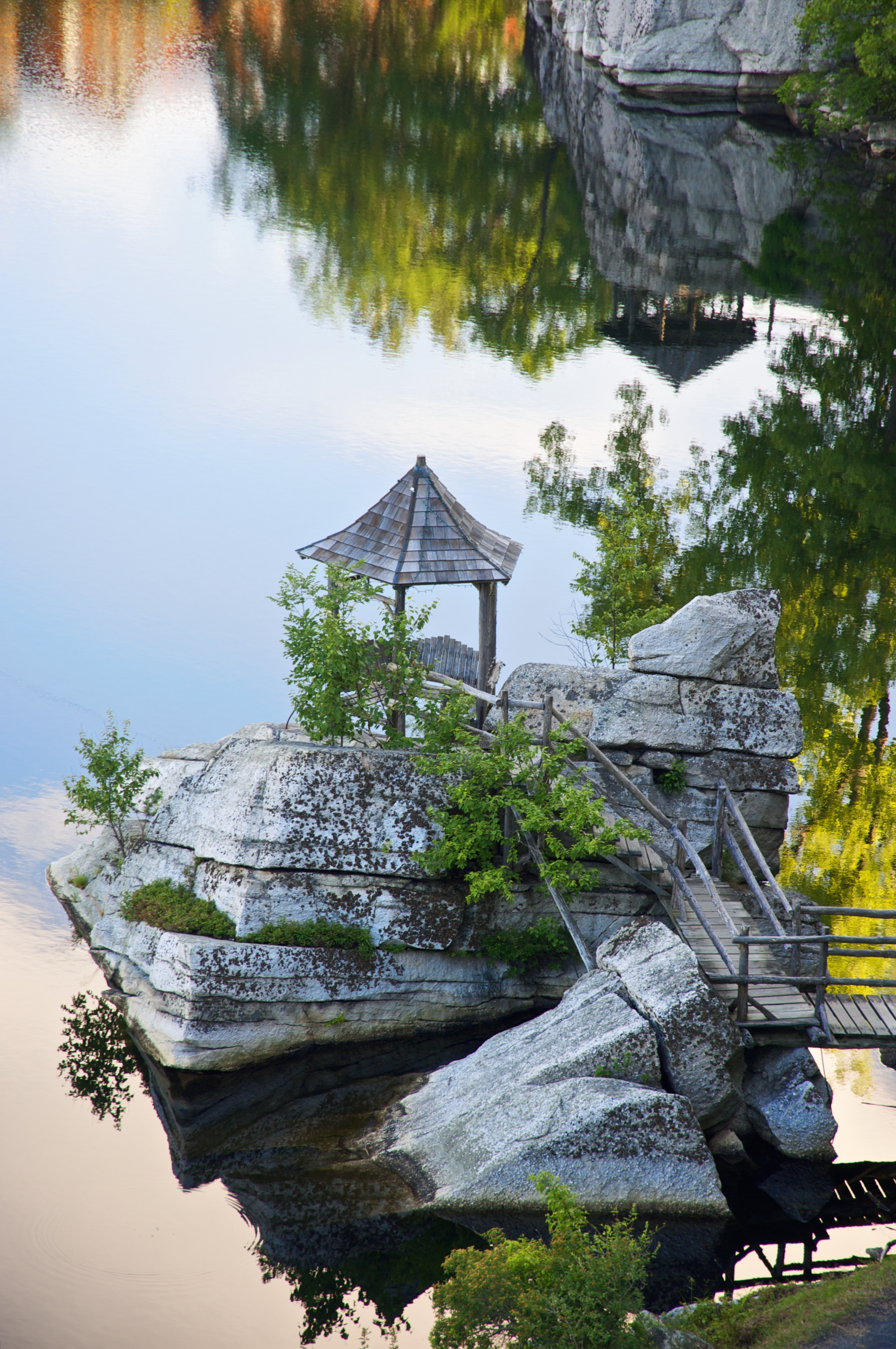
A gazebo to shade fishing, Lake Mohonk, New York

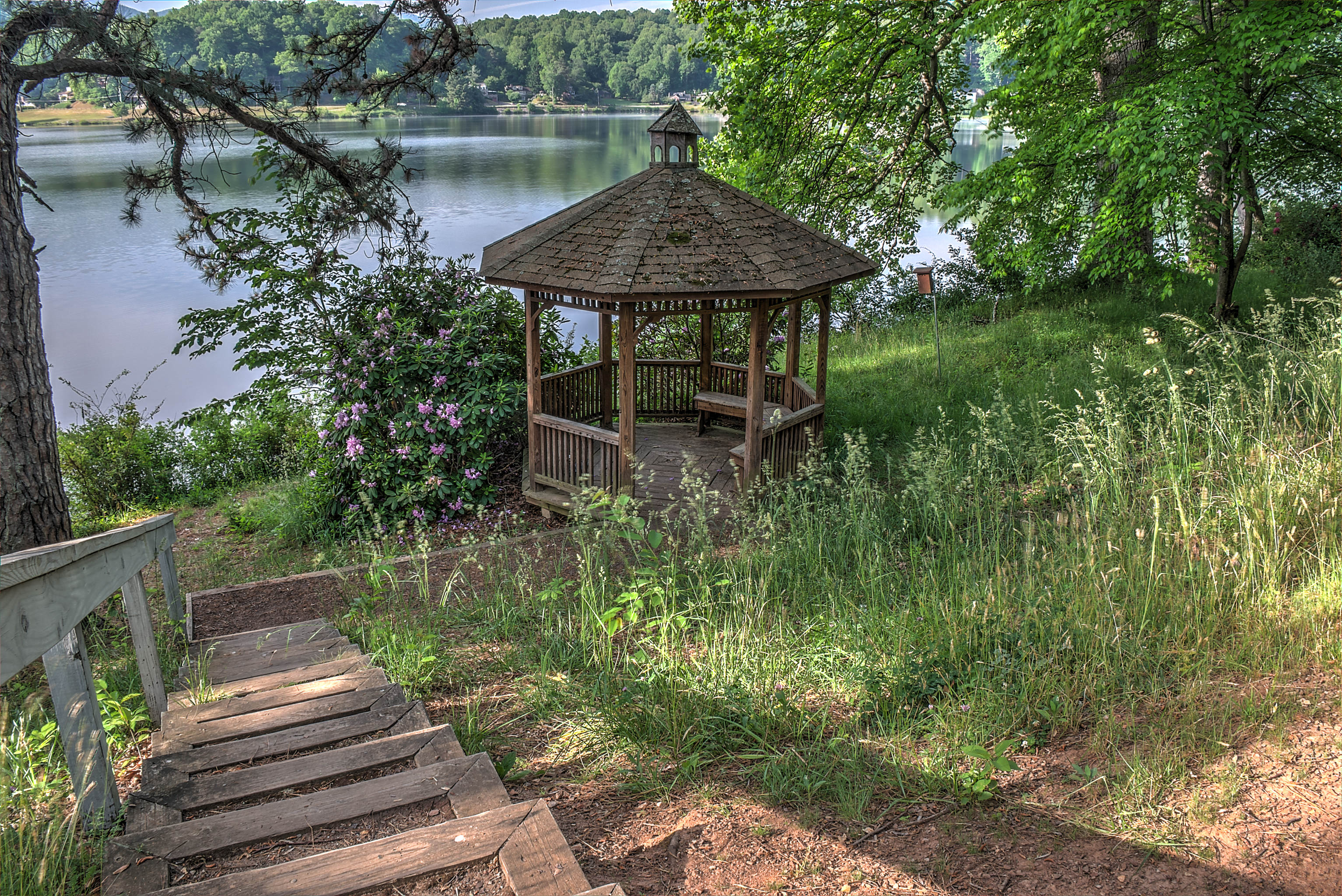
Gazebo at Lake Junaluska, North Carolina

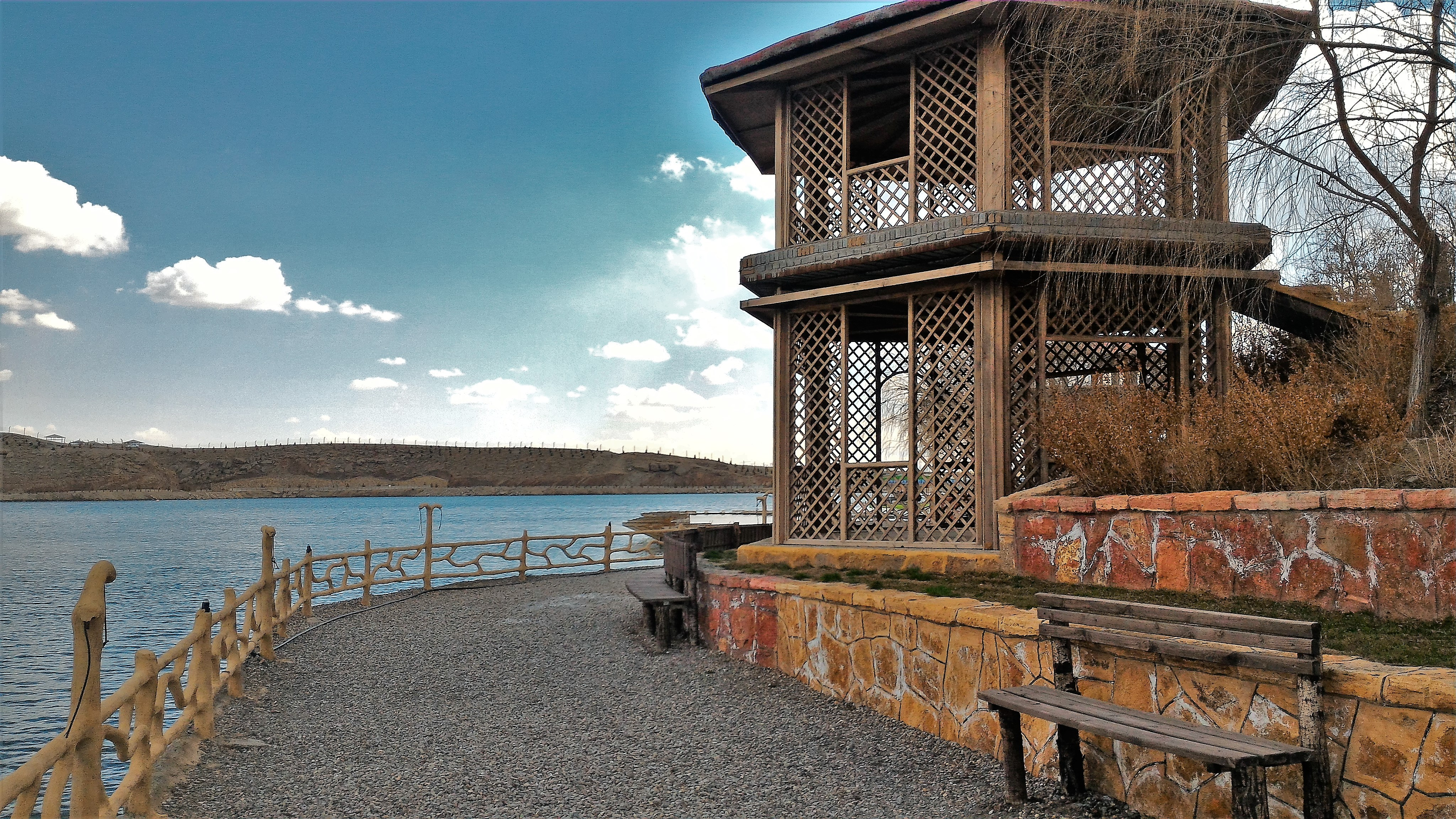
A two-story gazebo at Ammand Dam, Tabriz, Iran

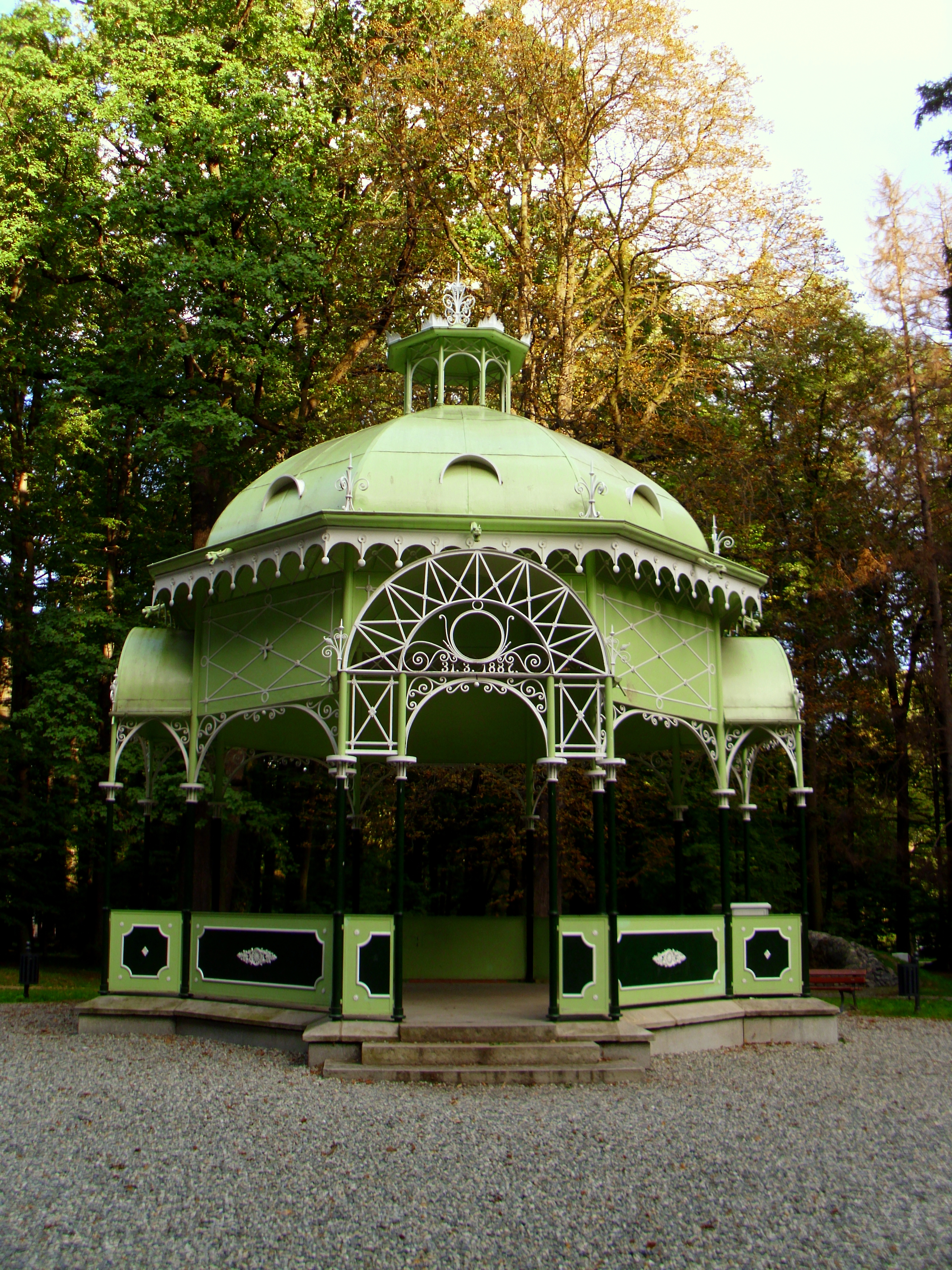
Gazebo in Prudnik, Poland

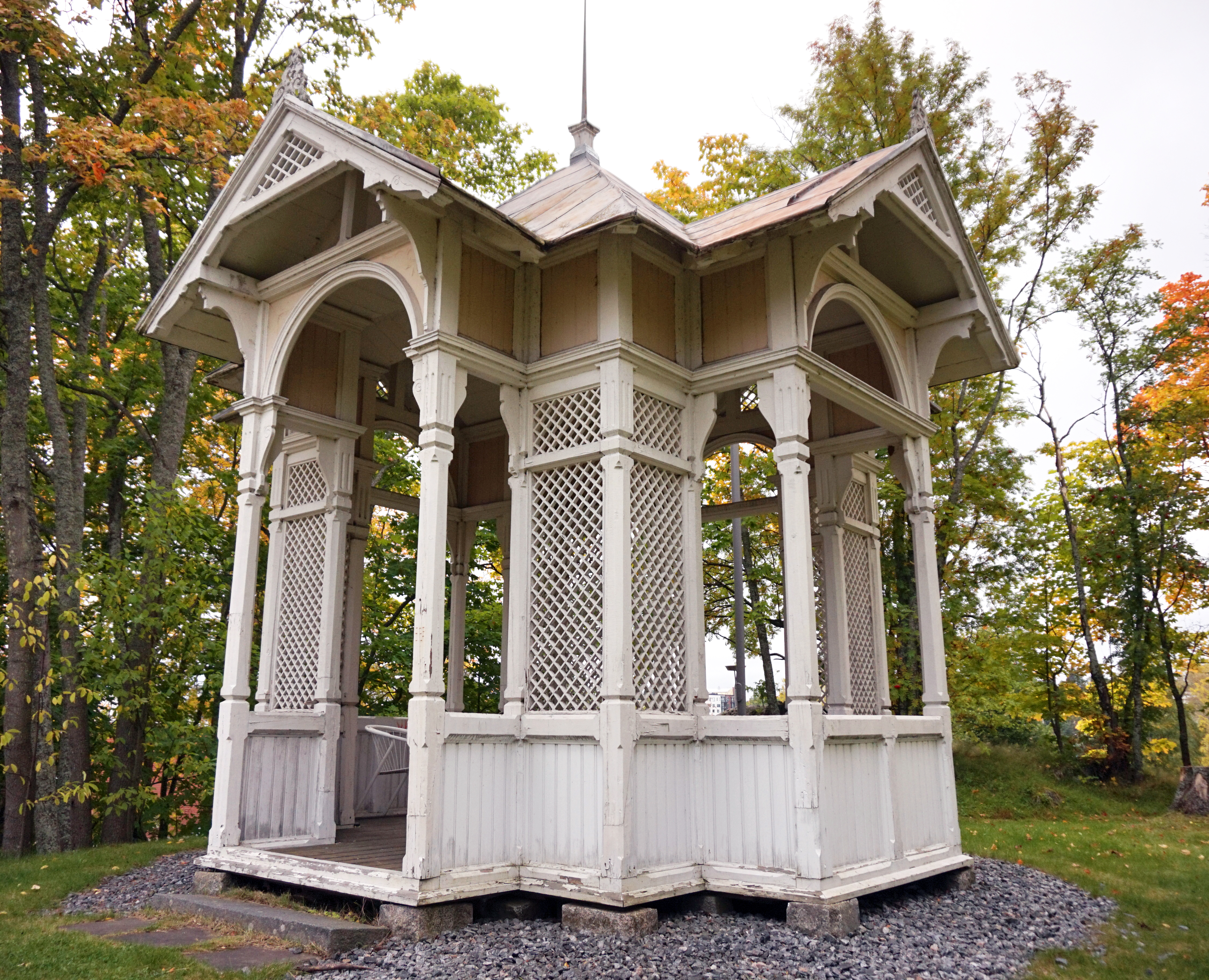
A small gazebo in Väinölänniemi, Kuopio, Finland

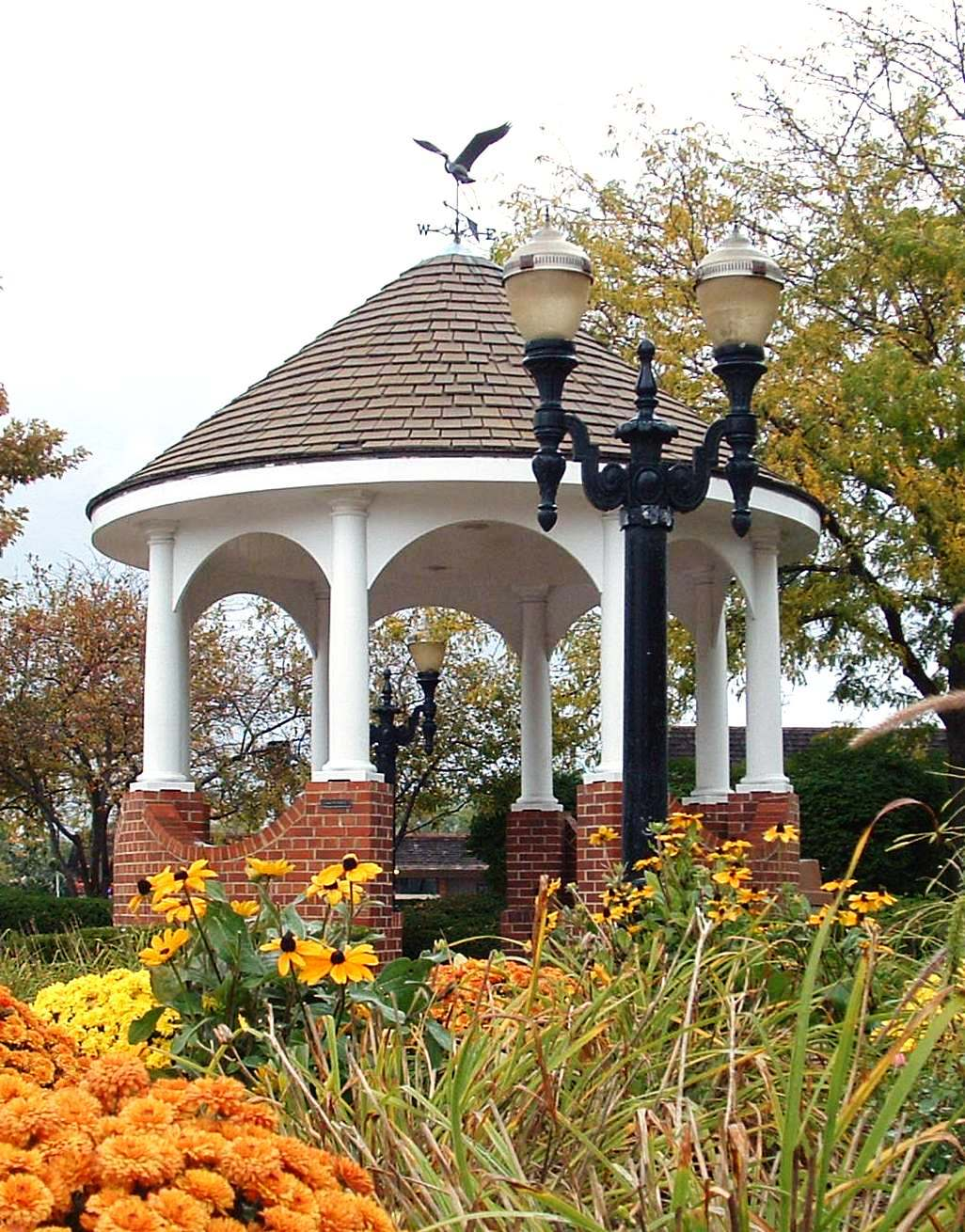
Gazebo in Barrington, Illinois, in the fall

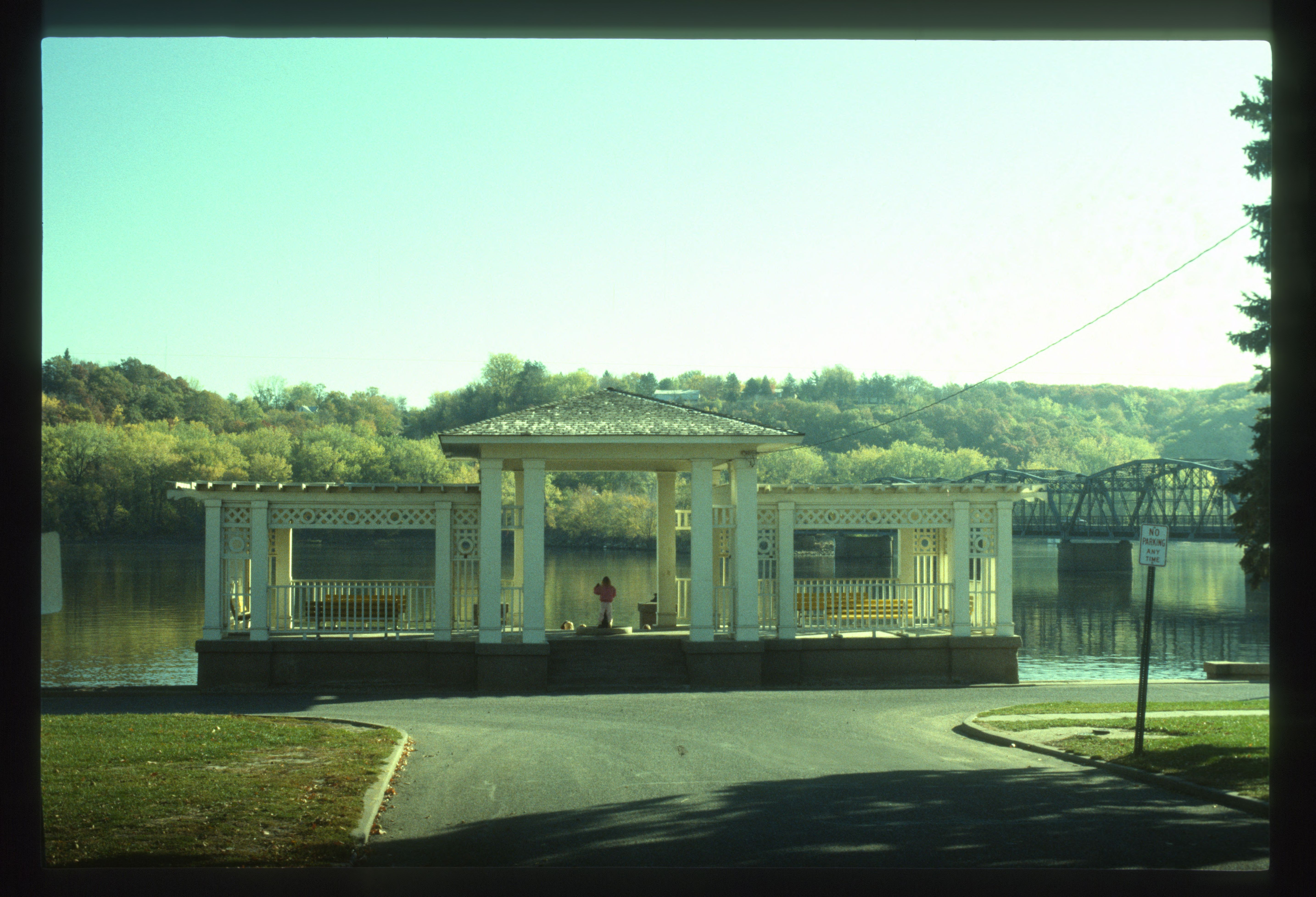
Lowell Park, Stillwater, Minnesota

== See also ==
- Belvedere
- Bandstand
- Canopy (architecture)
- Chickee
- Chinese pavilion
- Eric and the Dread Gazebo
- Monopteros: a ring of columns, often domed
- Pendhapa
- Solar canopy
- Spring House Gazebo
- Widow's walk
