= Eric and the Dread Gazebo =

Anecdote in role-playing game culture

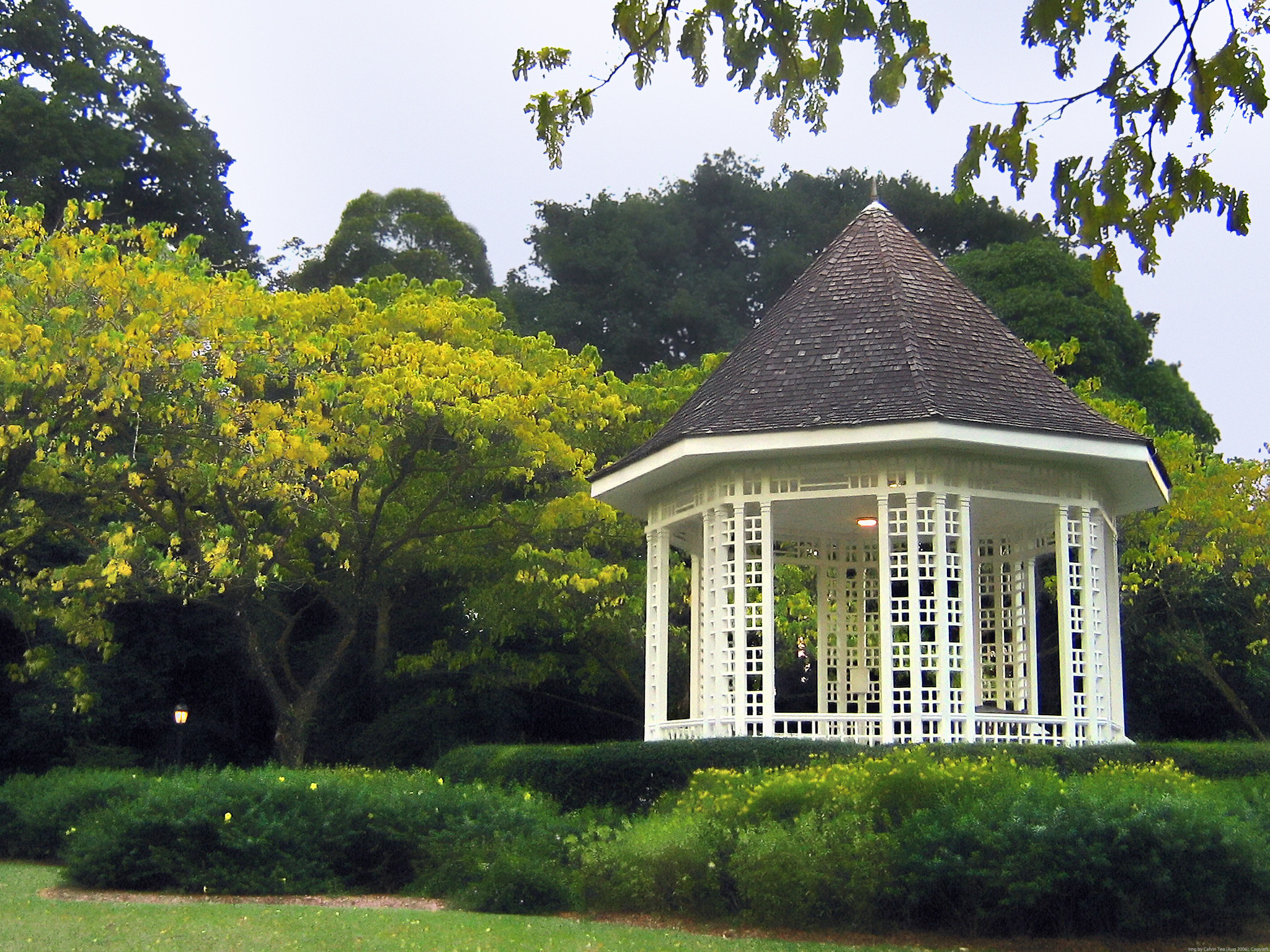
A gazebo

"Eric and the Dread Gazebo", also known as just "The Gazebo story", is a role-playing game anecdote, made famous by Richard Aronson (designer of The Ruins of Cawdor, a graphical MUD, and the voice of Cedric in King's Quest V). Aronson's account first appeared in print in the APA Alarums and Excursions #139, (March, 1987). It was reprinted in the RPG APA The Spell Book in 1987, and Mensa's The Mensa Bulletin in 1989. It subsequently spread to the internet where it has been frequently retold and adapted as short stories and comics. The story, as it was originally published, was titled "Eric and the Gazebo" but many retellings inserted the word 'Dread' in the title.

The tale features a player who misunderstands the gamemaster's description of a gazebo on a small hill, mistakenly assuming it to be some kind of monster in the game. After asking the gamemaster its color, size and distance from the group, the player attempts to call out to the gazebo. When it fails to respond, he looses an arrow at it, to little effect. ("There is now a gazebo with an arrow sticking out of it.") By the end of the encounter the player, lacking the means to harm the gazebo, opts to flee in desperation. The frustrated game master retaliates by humouring the player's misconception and announcing that the gazebo has awakened to capture and consume the player.

According to Ed Whitchurch (the real gamemaster of the story), the original incident on which the anecdote is based was actually less than a minute long, ending rather unceremoniously with Whitchurch asking "Don't you know what a gazebo is?"

The story has been called "legendary".

== See also ==
- Don Quixote#Tilting at windmills
- Mental model
