= Kenzer & Company =

American tabletop game publisher

- Industry: Role-playing, card games, board games and miniature wargaming publisher
- Headquarters: Waukegan, Illinois, United States
- Key people: David Kenzer; Brian Jelke; Jolly R. Blackburn; Steve Johansson; Jennifer Kenzer; Mark Plemmons
- Products: HackMaster, Aces & Eights: Shattered Frontier, Kingdoms of Kalamar role-playing games and Knights of the Dinner Table magazine
- Website: www.kenzerco.com

Kenzer & Company (KenzerCo) is a Waukegan, Illinois based publisher of comic books, role-playing games, board games, card games, and miniature games.

They are known for the Kingdoms of Kalamar campaign setting and for their own HackMaster and Aces & Eights: Shattered Frontier role-playing games (RPGs). Perhaps their best known product is the Knights of the Dinner Table (KoDT) magazine, which is a monthly publication that is part comic book and part RPG magazine. KenzerCo's line of comics now includes spinoffs such as Knights of the Dinner Table Illustrated and Spacehack, licensed comics in the Dungeons & Dragons line, and the fantasy literature magazine Black Gate. Other products include the Fairy Meat miniatures game, the Fuzzy Knights web strips, the Monty Python and the Holy Grail card game and board games such as Dwarven Dig, Elemental, and The Great Space Race.

== History ==
In the early 1990s, David Kenzer, a law student, was playing Advanced Dungeons & Dragons regularly with five friends, including Brian Jelke and Steve Johansson. In the spring of 1993, the group decided to start up a company in order to publish AD&D adventures. Kenzer filled out the paperwork to incorporate the company, and put "Kenzer and Company" as a placeholder for the company name. When the five friends objected to the name, Kenzer told them it was only a placeholder, and they were free to come up with a better name for the company. A discussion produced no consensus, and Kenzer laid down a deadline of a week to come up with a better name before he filed the papers. No better name was submitted, so the new company became known as Kenzer & Company.

After producing The Kingdom of Kalamar and another adventure, Kenzer decided to branch out, producing a licensed collectible card game (CCG) based on Monty Python and the Holy Grail in 1996, which proved to be a bestseller.

Kenzer began a casual relationship with Alderac Entertainment Group, which had just started to publish the RPG magazine Shadis, with Jolly Blackburn as editor. Kenzer and his staff wanted Blackburn to join Kenzer & Company after he left AEG in 1995, and Kenzer and others visited him in November 1996 during a local convention, during which Blackburn became convinced that Kenzer had the business sense and integrity he wanted in a partner. Kenzer & Company began publishing the Knights of the Dinner Table comic books by Blackburn, and beginning with issue #5 (February 1997) it became the work of the "KoDT Development Team" made up of Blackburn, Kenzer, Jelke and Johansson.

Kenzer acquired the license to Advanced Dungeons & Dragons from Wizards of the Coast that allowed the company to release HackMaster (2001) as a satire of AD&D. Kenzer was not willing to sign the Game System License that Wizards offered when they released 4th edition D&D in 2008, and he instead published a 501-page PDF for Kingdoms of Kalamar (2008) and did not reach out to Wizards for authorization.

== Unlicensed supplements and trademark issues ==
Studying Intellectual Property law at the time, Kenzer was sure that the company could produce non-licensed material for AD&D without TSR's approval. Their first project, published in 1994 , was the AD&D-compatible adventure The Kingdom of Kalamar. The adventure was marked "suitable for use with Advanced Dungeons & Dragons" printed on the back cover, and included the disclaimer text "Advanced Dungeons & Dragons is a registered trademark of TSR Hobbies, Inc. Use of this trademark is NOT sanctioned by the holder." This source book was a completely unlicensed product, and although TSR (the then-owner of the Dungeons & Dragons trademark) had a precedent of threatening legal action against similar supplements, Kenzer & Company was never threatened.

With the launch of Dungeons & Dragons’s 3rd edition, Wizards of the Coast made the d20 System available under the Open Game License (OGL) and d20 Trademark License. Under these licenses, authors are free to use the d20 System when writing games and game supplements. Shortly after Wizards of the Coast announced the 3rd edition of Dungeons & Dragons, they announced jointly with Kenzer & Company that Kenzer had acquired a license to produce official Dungeons & Dragons material, using the Kalamar setting exclusively.

With the release of the fourth edition, Wizards of the Coast introduced its Game System License, which represented a significant restriction compared with the very open policies embodied by the OGL. In response, Kenzer & Company launched an updated version of Kingdoms of Kalamar compatible with the 4th-edition version of Dungeons & Dragons that did not conform to the new GSL for approved use, instead releasing the campaign setting as an unlicensed supplement, similar to the original publication. The Dungeons & Dragons trademark is used in accordance with US law under a concept called nominative use – the book merely says that it is for use with the new version. David Kenzer is named as an expert in copyright law.

== Notable employees ==
- Barbara Blackburn - Assistant Editor of KoDT and staff writer
- Jolly Blackburn - Vice-President and creator of Knights of the Dinner Table
- Brian Jelke - Vice-President and game designer
- Steve Johansson - Vice-President and game designer
- David Kenzer - President and game designer
- CW Moellencamp - CFO
- Eli Ninnemann - Game designer

== Awards ==
Aces & Eights: Shattered Frontier, co-authored by Kenzer, Jolly R. Blackburn, Brian Jelke, Steve Johansson, Jennifer Kenzer and Mark Plemmons, won a 2007 Origins Award in the category Roleplaying Game of the Year 2007, and a Silver ENnie Award for "Best Game of 2007."

== See also ==
- Midnight's Terror
