= Jolly Blackburn =

American cartoonist

Jolly Randall Blackburn is an American publisher and cartoonist who is best known as the creator of the comic strip and identically titled magazine Knights of the Dinner Table.

== Early life ==
As a child, Jolly Blackburn enjoyed playing Monopoly, Life, Sorry and many other board games. At age 15, he was introduced to the Avalon Hill wargame Luftwaffe, and soon owned several other wargames. While perusing wargames at the local games shop, Blackburn was introduced to Dungeons & Dragons, and he eventually created his own campaign world called Alderac.

Following high school, Blackburn entered Ball State University where he majored in anthropology, history, and classical cultures.

Jolly married his wife, Barbara after college. Their daughter Amber Kay Blackburn died in 2011 at age 23.

== Shadis ==
After graduation, Blackburn enlisted in the Army, along with his wife, Barbara under the Married Couples program. Blackburn had always wanted to be a writer, and while he was posted in Fort Jackson, South Carolina, he and Barbara launched a gaming magazine titled Shadis. He also created Alderac Entertainment Group, named after his D&D campaign world. (Shadis was the name of one of the moons that circled Alderac.)

Shadis was a black-and-white digest that featured gaming articles usually written by Blackburn, as well as several fictional works by Blackburn, collectively referred to as the "Alderac Anthology", since they were set in Blackburn's Alderac world.

In the second issue, faced with a blank last page, Blackburn drew a roughly drawn comic strip titled Knights of the Dinner Table that featured a group of gamers seated at a table playing a fictional role-playing game called Hackmaster. As Blackburn told Allen Varney, "I had been a great fan of J.D. Webster's Finieous Fingers from the early Dragon Magazine, and I wanted something similar. Unfortunately, I couldn't find anyone willing to do a strip. Finally I sat down and drew out a very crude cartoon showing a gamemaster and a player sitting around a table arguing over a rules call." Blackburn based the comic strip's players on his gamer friends, and the gamemaster B.A. Felton on himself. Blackburn continued to draw the cartoon for Issues 3 to 5, but in Issue 6, believing that his readers wanted better artwork and a more involved storyline, Blackburn replaced his own comic strip with more professional cartoon strips. However, his readers' outcry convinced him to immediately return to Knights of the Dinner Table in the very next issue.

Blackburn had to put both Shadis and Knights of the Dinner Table on hold for 18 months in 1991–1992. He was still working as a sergeant in the army, and during Operation: Desert Storm, Blackburn was involved with activating reservists for remedial training prior to deployment, a job that required him to work working seven days a week for up to 16 hours a day. Following the end of the conflict, Blackburn returned to writing.

== Knights of the Dinner Table ==
In 1994, Alderac published a Knights of the Dinner Table comic book, and followed up with two more issues. But by the following year, Blackburn felt that his plans for the future had diverged from his partners John Zinser and David Seay — they wanted to expand Alderac and look for success in the collectible card game industry while Blackburn wanted to keep the company fun and small and focus on Knights of the Dinner Table. Blackburn sold his share of Alderac to his partners — keeping the rights to Knights of the Dinner Table — and also sold Shadis after Issue 21.

Blackburn believed that he could produce a monthly Knights of the Dinner Table magazine, and started up KODT Enteractive Facktory with that in mind.

While he was working on getting that new company together, Blackburn received a call from the editor of TSR's Dragon magazine, asking if the Knights of the Dinner Table strip was now available; although Blackburn originally planned to continue the strip in Shadis, he accepted the offer and Knights of the Dinner Table appeared Issue 226 of Dragon (February 1996). Blackburn's comic suddenly reached ten times the audience that it in Shadis, and Blackburn was surprised at the overwhelmingly positive response. He later recounted "I think that's when the light bulb went on over my head. I was shocked by the interest and the apparent appetite for more." Knights of the Dinner Table would continue in Dragon until Issue 269 (March 2000), when it was replaced by an expanded Nodwick strip.

After he and Barbara finally published Knights of the Dinner Table #4, Blackburn questioned whether they could make it work on their own. In November 1996 when David Kenzer and some of his Kenzer & Company staff of met Blackburn at a local con, Kenzer asked Blackburn to join his company. Blackburn decided that Kenzer had the sort of business sense and integrity that he was looking for in a partner, and he agreed to become a shareholder. Kenzer reprinted Issue 4 of Knights of the Dinner Table that the Blackburns had produced on their own. Starting with Issue 5 (February 1997), Knights of the Dinner Table was the work of the "KoTD Development Team" which consisted of Jolly Blackburn, David Kenzer, Brian Jelke and Steve Johansson.

Knights of the Dinner Table increased in popularity, and Blackburn was invited to be the guest of honor at several conventions, including U Con (November 1998), Key Con (April 2003) and Gencon (August 2004).

In 2022, Knights of the Dinner Table published its 301st issue, becoming the longest comic book series by a single creator (passing the 300 issues of Cerebus the Aardvark created by David Sim).

In 2023, Blackburn announced that Knights of the Dinner Table would be moving to an expanded format, but only once every two months, citing the short turnaround times for a monthly magazine and increased production costs.

== Hackmaster ==
As early as 1995, Blackburn toyed with the idea of creating a one-off joke role-playing game called Hackmaster, based on the fictional role-playing game being played in Knights of the Dinner Table. However, Dave Kenzer urged him to wait, believing that it could become a serious product. In 2000, using a license for the AD&D rules, Blackburn and Kenzer created Hackmaster, based on the rules for D&D.

Several years later, Blackburn made the decision to break away from the D&D game system and create an independent role-playing system for Hackmaster. This enabled him to include many items and ideas from the Knights of the Dinner Table comics.

== Reception ==
Writing for Black Gate, John O'Neill noted that the artwork is not what draws readers to Knights of the Dinner Table, commenting, "Jolly has never claimed to be an artist, and in truth the art isn't where this strip shines anyway. Jolly's true gifts are as a writer, and the writing in KoDT is top notch."

== Awards ==
Blackburn has received a number of awards for Knights of the Dinner Table, including:

- Origins Awards for "Best Professional Game Magazine" of 1998 and 1999.
- Origins Award for "Gamer's Choice: Best Periodical of 2003".
- Origins Award for "Best Game Accessory of 2009".
