= Slavic paganism =

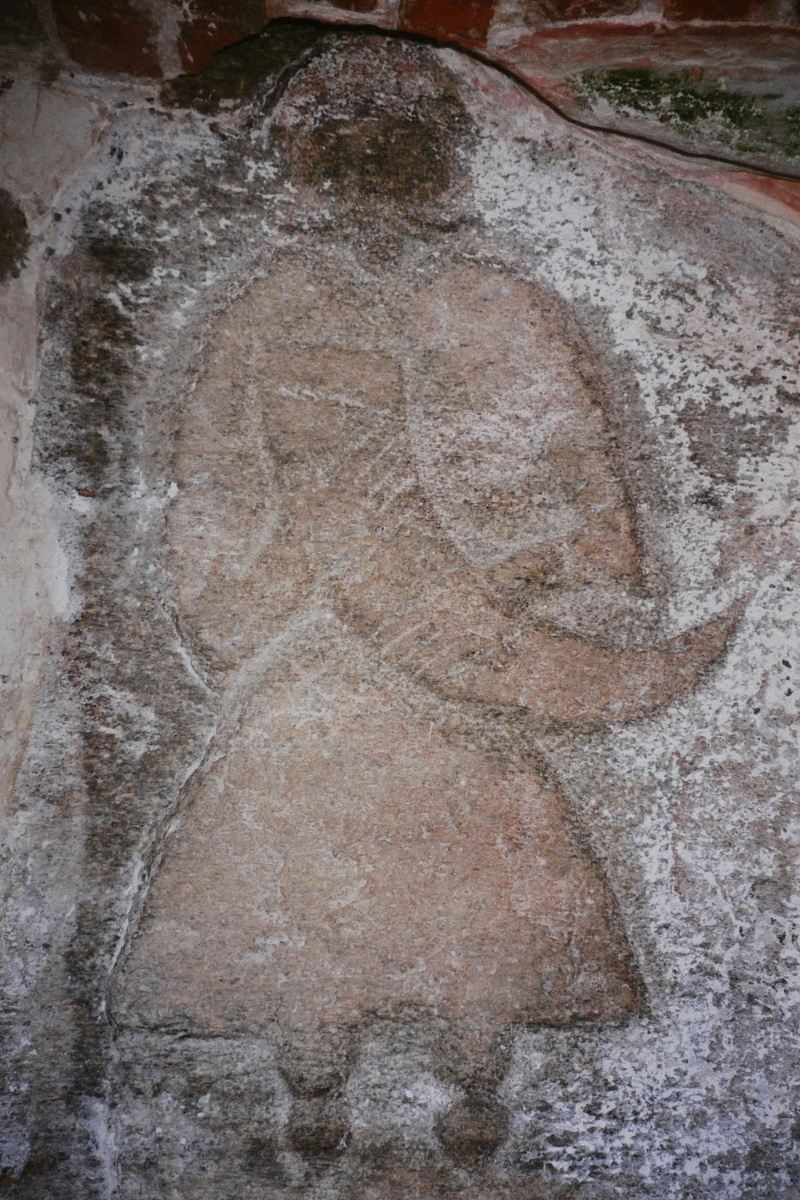
A priest of Svantevit depicted on a stone from Arkona, now in the church of Altenkirchen, Rügen.

Slavic paganism encompasses the historical pre-Christian religious beliefs, mythologies, and ritual practices of the Slavic peoples before their gradual Christianization between the 8th and 13th centuries. Rooted in broader Proto-Indo-European religion, the historical Slavic faith was polytheistic and animistic, characterized by a deep reverence for nature, ancestor worship, and rituals tied closely to the agricultural calendar. While a unified pan-Slavic pantheon likely never existed due to geographic fragmentation, certain core deities and cosmological concepts were shared across the East, West, and South Slavs.

== History ==
The South Slavs, who likely settled in Southeastern Europe during the 6th–7th centuries AD, bordering with the Byzantine Empire to the south, came under the sphere of influence of Eastern Christianity relatively early, beginning with the creation of writing systems for Slavic languages (first Glagolitic, and then Cyrillic script) in 855 by the brothers Saints Cyril and Methodius and the adoption of Christianity in Bulgaria in 864 and 863 in Great Moravia. The East Slavs followed with the official adoption in 988 by Vladimir the Great of Kievan Rus'.

The process of Christianising the West Slavs was more gradual and complicated compared to their eastern counterparts. The Moravians accepted Christianity as early as 831, the Bohemian dukes followed in 845, and the Slovaks accepted Christianity somewhere between the years 828 and 863, but the first historical Polish ruler, Mieszko I, accepted it much later, in 966, around the same time as the Sorbs, while the Polabian Slavs only came under the significant influence of the Catholic Church from the 12th century onwards. For the Polabian Slavs and the Sorbs, Christianisation went hand in hand with full or partial Germanisation.

The Christianisation of the Slavic peoples was, however, a slow and—in many cases—superficial phenomenon, especially in what is today Russia. It was vigorous in western and central parts of what is today Ukraine, since they were closer to Kiev, the capital of Kievan Rus'. Even there, however, popular resistance led by volkhvs, pagan priests or shamans, recurred periodically for centuries. Popular resistance to Christianity was also widespread in early Poland, culminating in the pagan reaction.

The West Slavs of the Baltic tenaciously withstood Christianity until it was violently imposed on them through the Northern Crusades. Among Poles and East Slavs, rebellions broke out throughout the 11th century. Christian chroniclers reported that the Slavs regularly re-embraced their original religion (relapsi sunt denuo ad paganismus).

Many elements of the Slavic indigenous religion were officially incorporated into Slavic Christianity (which manifested itself in the architecture of the Russian Church, icon painting, etc.), and the worship of Slavic gods has persisted in unofficial folk religion into modern times. The Slavs' resistance to Christianity gave rise to a "whimsical syncretism", which was called dvoeverie, "double faith", in Old Church Slavonic. Since the early 20th century, Slavic folk religion has undergone an organised reinvention and reincorporation in the movement of Slavic Native Faith (Rodnovery).

== Sources ==
=== Foreign sources ===
One of the first written sources on the religion of the ancient Slavs is the description of the Byzantine historian Procopius of Caesarea (6th century), who mentioned sacrifices to the supreme god-the thunderer of the Slavs, river spirits ("nymphs") and others:

These tribes, the Slavs and the Antes, are not ruled by one person, but since ancient times they have lived in the people's rule (democracy), and therefore their happiness and unhappiness in life is considered a common cause. And in all other respects, both of these barbarian tribes have the same life and laws. They believe that one of the gods, the creator of lightning, is the lord over all, and bulls are sacrificed to him and other sacred rites are performed. They do not know fate and generally do not recognize that it has any power in relation to people, and when they are about to face death, whether they are seized by illness or in a dangerous situation in the war, they promise, if they are saved, to immediately sacrifice to God for their soul; having escaped death, they sacrifice what they promised, and they think that their salvation has been bought at the price of this sacrifice. They worship rivers, and nymphs, and all sorts of other deities, offer sacrifices to all of them and with the help of these sacrifices they also produce divination.

— Procopius of Caesarea. The war with the Goths. Book VII (Book III of the War with the Goths)

Al-Masudi, an Arab historian, geographer and traveler, equates the paganism of the Slavs and the Rus' with reason:

There was a decree of the capital of the Khazar khaganate, and there are seven judges in it, two of them from Muslims, two from the Khazars, who judge according to the law of Taura, two from the Christians there, who judge according to the law of Injil, one of them from the Slavs, Russ and other pagans, he judges according to the law of paganism, that is, according to the law of reason.

— Al-Masudi. Gold mines or placers of gems

Western European authors of the 11th and 12th centuries gave detailed descriptions of the sanctuaries and cults of Redigost (Radegast, Svarozhich) in Rethra, Svyatovit (Svetovid) in Arkon (Jaromarsburg), Triglav in Szczecin, Chernobog, the sanctuary in Volyně, etc. The identification of a number of Eastern European monuments with Slavic sanctuaries is a matter of dispute (Peryn, a complex near the site of the Zbruch idol).

=== Slavic sources ===
The main idea of paganism and mythology of the Slavs is given primarily by historical and documentary sources (letopises and chronicles). The Tale of Bygone Years under the year 980 contains a story about the sanctuary in Kiev, built by Vladimir Svyatoslavich, and the idols of pagan gods installed there are mentioned:

And Vladimir began to reign alone in Kiev. And he placed idols on the hill outside the palace: Perun in wood with a silver head and a gold moustache, and Khors, Dazhdbog and Stribog and Simargl and Mokosh. And they offered sacrifices and called them gods, and they took their sons and daughters to them and sacrificed them to the devils. And they profaned the earth with their sacrifices, and Rus’ and that hill were profaned by blood. But God the merciful, who does not wish the death of sinners, on that hill stands today the church of Saint Vasilij, as we will relate later.

Old East Slavic original text
И нача къняжити Володимиръ въ Кыевѣ единъ, и постави кумиры на хълму, вънѣ двора теремьнаго: Перуна древяна, а главу его сьребряну, а усъ златъ, и Хърса, Дажьбога и Стрибога и Сѣмарьгла и Мокошь. И жьряху имъ, наричюще я богы, и привожаху сыны своя и дъщери, и жьряху бѣсомъ. И осквьрняху землю требами своими; и осквьрни ся кръвьми земля Русьская и хълмъ тъ. Нъ преблагыи Богъ не хотя съмьрти грѣшьникомъ, на томь хълмѣ нынѣ цьркы есть святаго Василия, якоже послѣди съкажемъ.

— Primary Chronicle

The text mentions the deities Svarog, Yarilo and Veles. It is known that the idol of Veles stood in Kiev "under the mountain", probably on the Kiev Podol, in the lower part of the city, that is, in the trade and craft part of Kiev at the pier on the Pochain River. In the "Life of Vladimir" it is said that this idol was overthrown during the baptism of Kievan Rus in 988: "And Veles idol ... ordered to throw off the river in Pochaina".

Ancient Russian teachings against paganism can also serve as sources. In this genre, three of the most famous monuments are known: The Word of St. Gregory about idols, The word of a certain Christ-lover and the punishment of the spiritual father (about submission and obedience) and The Walking of the Virgin in torment.

=== Modern sources ===
In the absence of original mythological texts, Slavic paganism can only be understood through secondary sources, such as archaeological findings and non-Slavic historical texts, which then have to be analyzed via the comparative method and subsequent reconstruction, a means used by many historians, including Evgeny Anichkov, Dmitry Zelenin, Lubor Niederle, Henryk Łowmiański, Aleksander Gieysztor, Stanisław Urbańczyk and others.

Reconstruction, however, only gained momentum at the beginning of the 20th century, with Slavic sources being compared to sources on other Indo-European cultural traditions (Baltic, Iranian, German, etc.), where the works of Vechaslav Ivanov and Vladimir Toporov are among the most prominent.

The richest sources for the study of Slavic paganism as a cultural model and the reconstruction of Ancient Slavic ideas remain the linguistic, ethnographic and folklore studies of Slavic traditions from the 19th and 20th century, although some of these studies are contested due to historical inaccuracies. Many traces of Slavic paganism are thought to be left in European toponymy, including the names of settlements, rivers, mountains, and villages, but ethnologists such as Vitomir Belaj warn against hasty assumptions that the toponyms truly originate in pre-Christian mythological beliefs, with some potentially being derived from common vocabulary instead.

Twentieth-century scholars who pursued the study of ancient Slavic religion include Vyacheslav Ivanov, Vladimir Toporov, Marija Gimbutas, Boris Rybakov, and Roman Jakobson, among others. Rybakov is noted for his effort to re-examine medieval ecclesiastical texts, synthesizing his findings with archaeological data, comparative mythology, ethnography, and nineteenth-century folk practices. He also elaborated one of the most coherent pictures of ancient Slavic religion in his Paganism of the Ancient Slavs and other works. Among earlier, nineteenth-century scholars there was Bernhard Severin Ingemann, known for his study of Fundamentals of a North Slavic and Wendish mythology.

Historical documents about Slavic religion include the Primary Chronicle, compiled in Kiev around 1111, and the Novgorod First Chronicle compiled in the Novgorod Republic. They contain detailed reports of the annihilation of the official Slavic religion of Kiev and Novgorod, and the subsequent "double faith". The Primary Chronicle also contains the authentic text of Rus'-Greek treatises (dated 945 and 971) with native pre-Christian oaths. From the eleventh century onwards, various Rus' writings were produced against the survival of Slavic religion, and Slavic gods were interpolated in the translations of foreign literary works, such as the Malalas Chronicle and the Alexandreis.

The West Slavs who dwelt in the area between the Vistula and the Elbe stubbornly resisted the Northern Crusades, and the history of their resistance is written down in the eleventh- and twelfth-century Latin Chronicles by Thietmar of Merseburg, Adam of Bremen, and Helmold, three German clergymen, as well as in the twelfth-century biographies of Otto of Bamberg, and in Saxo Grammaticus' thirteenth-century Gesta Danorum. These documents, together with minor German writings and the Icelandic Knýtlinga saga, provide a detailed description of northwestern Slavic religion.

The religions of other Slavic populations are less well-documented as texts about them, such as the fifteenth-century Polish Chronicle, were only produced later, after Christianisation, and contain a lot of sheer inventions. In the times preceding Christianisation, however, some Greek and Roman chroniclers, such as Procopius and Jordanes in the sixth century, sparsely documented some Slavic concepts and practices.

== Overview and common features ==
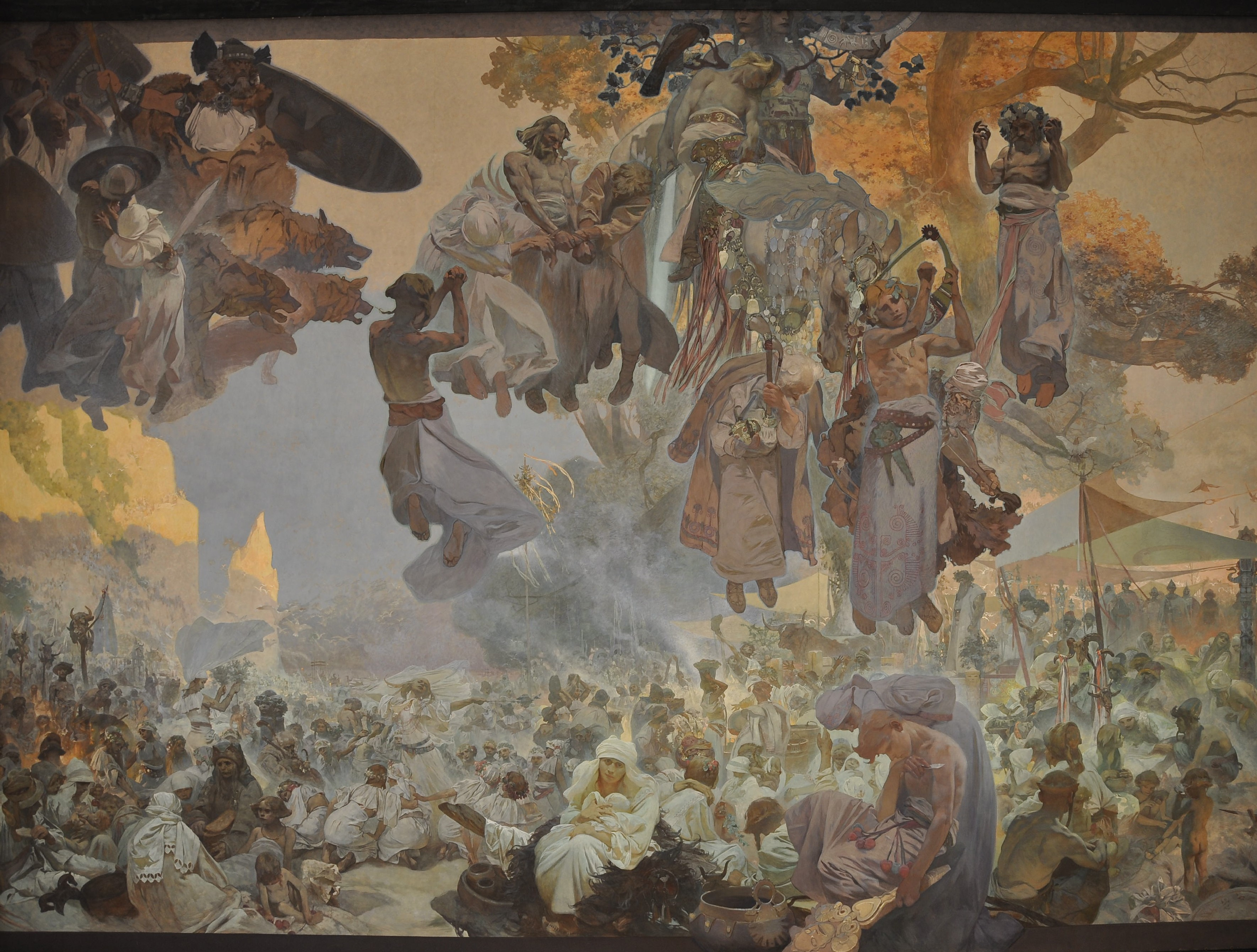
"The Celebration of Svantovit in Rujana: When Gods Are at War, Art is the Salvation" (Slavnost Svantovítova: Když jsou bohové ve válce, pak je umění spásou)—Alphonse Mucha, 1912. Pagan-themed painting part of The Slav Epic. (Note: Anna Dvořák, in the upper right section of The Celebration of Svantovit, identifies a group of priests. The figure of a priest with his arms stretched out prays for the future of the Slavs, both in times of peace (represented by the young man to his left) and in times of war (the man with a sword to the priest's right).)

=== Origins and other influences ===
The Early Slavs (5th to 10th centuries AD) inhabited extensive lands across central, eastern and southeastern Europe. They spoke closely-related languages that split from proto-Slavic in the 6th century, with only minor differences in dialect. The words for religious concepts in the pre-Christian Slavic languages are almost identical, which implies a uniform religion among the Slavs. It has been argued that Slavic identity was originally ethno-religious: whether a person was a Slav was chiefly determined by their religious beliefs and practices, not their racial ancestry or birthplace. Ivanov and Toporov identified the Slavic religion as an outgrowth of a purported common Proto-Indo-European religion, sharing strong similarities with other neighbouring belief systems such as those of the Balts, Thracians and Phrygians.

Local development of the ancient Slavic religion, especially in Russia, was likely influenced by the neighbouring Finnic peoples, contributing to local ethnogenesis. Historians consider Slavic (and Baltic) religion and mythology to be more conservative (closer to the original Proto-Indo-European religion) than other Indo-European derived traditions, because Slavic religion remained widely practised for centuries. In contrast, other Indo-European derived religions were modified by intellectual elites. Therefore studies of Slavic religion provide information on the evolution of other Indo-European beliefs.

The affinity to Proto-Indo-Iranian religion is evident in shared developments, including the elimination of the term for the supreme God of Heaven, *Dyeus, and its substitution by the term for "sky" (Slavic Nebo), the shift of the Indo-European descriptor of heavenly deities (Avestan daeva, Old Church Slavonic div; Proto-Indo-European *deiwos, "celestial", similar to Dyeus) to the designation of evil entities, and the parallel designation of gods by the term meaning both "wealth" and its "giver" (Avestan baga, Slavic bog). Much of the religious vocabulary of the Slavs, including vera (loosely translated as "faith", meaning "radiation of knowledge"), svet ("light"), mir ("peace", "agreement of parts", also meaning "world") and rai ("paradise"), is shared with Iranian.

According to Adrian Ivakhiv, the Indo-European element of Slavic religion may have included what Georges Dumézil studied as the "trifunctional hypothesis", that is to say a threefold conception of the social order, represented by the three castes of priests, warriors and farmers. According to Marija Gimbutas, Slavic religion represented an unmistakable overlap of any purported Indo-European-originated themes with ancient religious themes dating back to time immemorial. The latter were particularly hardwearing in Slavic religion, represented by the widespread devotion to Mat Syra Zemlya, the "Damp Mother Earth". Rybakov said the continuity and gradual complexification of Slavic religion started from devotion to life-giving forces (bereginy), ancestors and the supreme God, Rod ("Generation" itself), and developed into the "high mythology" of the official religion of the early Kievan Rus'.

=== God and spirits ===
As attested by Helmold (c. 1120–1177) in his Chronica Slavorum, the Slavs believed in a single heavenly God begetting all the lesser spirits governing nature, and worshipped it by their means. According to Helmold, "obeying the duties assigned to them, [the deities] have sprung from his [the supreme God's] blood and enjoy distinction in proportion to their nearness to the god of the gods". According to Rybakov's studies, wheel symbols such as the "thunder marks" (gromovoi znak) and the "six-petaled rose inside a circle" (e.g.), which are quite common in Slavic folk crafts and which were still carved on edges and peaks of roofs in northern Russia in the nineteenth century, were symbols of the supreme life-giver Rod. Before its conceptualisation as Rod, Rybakov claims, this supreme God was known as Deivos (cognate with Sanskrit Deva, Latin Deus, Old High German Ziu and Lithuanian Dievas). The Slavs believed that from this God was preceded by a cosmic duality, represented by Belobog ("White God") and Chernobog ("Black God", also named Tiarnoglofi, "Black Head/Mind"), representing the root of all the heavenly-masculine and the earthly-feminine deities, or the waxing light and waning light gods, respectively. In both categories, deities might be either Razi, "rede-givers", or Zirnitra, "wizards".

The Slavs perceived the world as inhabited by a variety of spirits, which they represented as persons and worshipped. These spirits included those of waters (mavka and rusalka), forests (lisovyk), fields (polyovyk), those of households (domovoy), those of illnesses, luck and human ancestors. For instance, Leshy is an important woodland spirit, believed to distribute food assigning preys to hunters, later regarded as a god of flocks and herds, and still worshipped in this function in early twentieth-century Russia. Many gods were regarded as the ancestors of individual kins (rod or pleme), and the idea of ancestrality was so important that Slavic religion may be epitomised as a "manism" (i.e. worship of ancestors), though the Slavs did not keep genealogical records.

The Slavs also worshipped star-gods, including the moon (Russian: Mesyats) and the sun (Solntse), the former regarded as male and the latter as female. The moon-god was particularly important, regarded as the dispenser of abundance and health, worshipped through round dances, and in some traditions considered the progenitor of humanity. The belief in the moon-god was still very much alive in the nineteenth century, and peasants in the Ukrainian Carpathians openly affirmed that the moon is their god.

Some Slavic deities are related to Baltic mythology: Perun/Perkūnas, Veles/Velnias, Rod/Dievas, Yarilo/Saulė. There was an evident continuity between the beliefs of the East Slavs, West Slavs and South Slavs. They shared the same traditional deities, as attested, for instance, by the worship of Zuarasiz among the West Slavs, corresponding to Svarožič among the East Slavs. All the bright male deities were regarded as the hypostases, forms or phases in the year, of the active and masculine divine force personified by Perun ("Thunder").

Perun's name, from the Indo-European root *per or *perk^{w} ("to strike", "splinter"), signified both the splintering thunder and the splintered tree (especially the oak; the Latin name of this tree, quercus, comes from the same root), regarded as symbols of the irradiation of the force. This root also gave rise to the Vedic Parjanya, the Baltic Perkūnas, the Albanian Perëndi (now denoting "God" and "sky"), the Germanic Fjörgynn and the Greek Keraunós ("thunderbolt", rhymic form of *Peraunós, used as an epithet of Zeus). From the exact same root comes the name of the Finnish deity Ukko, which has a Balto-Slavic origin. Prĕgyni or peregyni, despite being rendered as bregynja or beregynja (from breg, bereg, meaning "shore") and reinterpreted as female water spirits in modern Russian folklore, were rather spirits of trees and rivers related to Perun, as attested by various chronicles and highlighted by the root *per.

Slavic traditions preserved very ancient elements and intermingled with those of neighbouring European peoples. An exemplary case are the South Slavic still-living rain rituals of the couple Perun–Perperuna, Lord and Lady Thunder, shared with the neighbouring Albanians, Greeks and Arumanians.

The West Slavs, especially those of the Baltic, prominently worshipped Svetovid ("Lord of Power"), while the East Slavs prominently worshipped Perun himself, especially after Vladimir's 970s–980s reforms. The various spirits were believed to manifest in certain places, which were revered as numinous and holy; they included springs, rivers, groves, rounded tops of hills and flat cliffs overlooking rivers. Calendrical rituals were attuned with the spirits, which were believed to have periods of waxing and waning throughout the year, determining the agrarian fertility cycle.

=== Cosmology, iconography, temples and rites ===
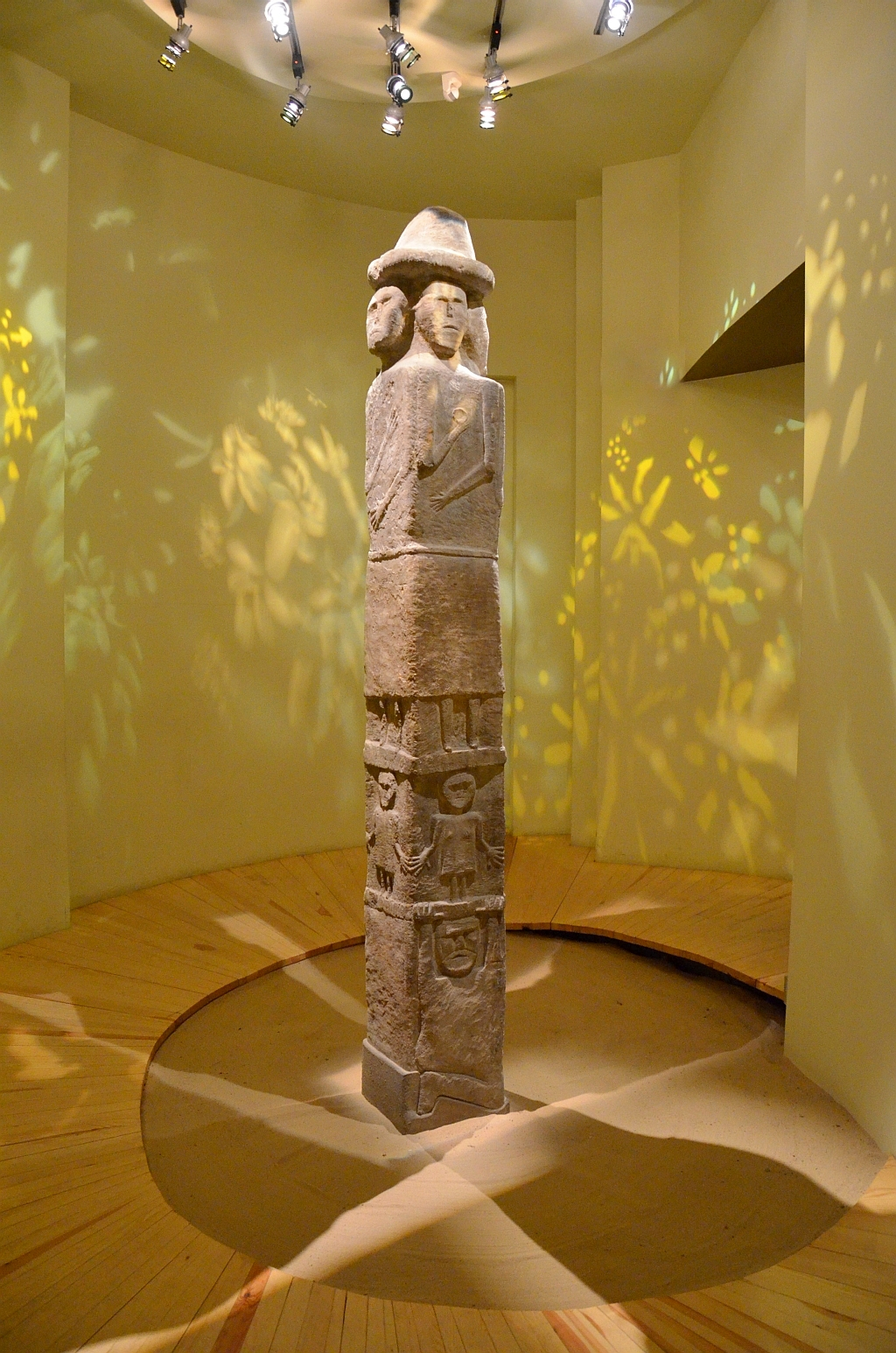
The Zbruch Idol on display at the Krakow Archaeological Museum

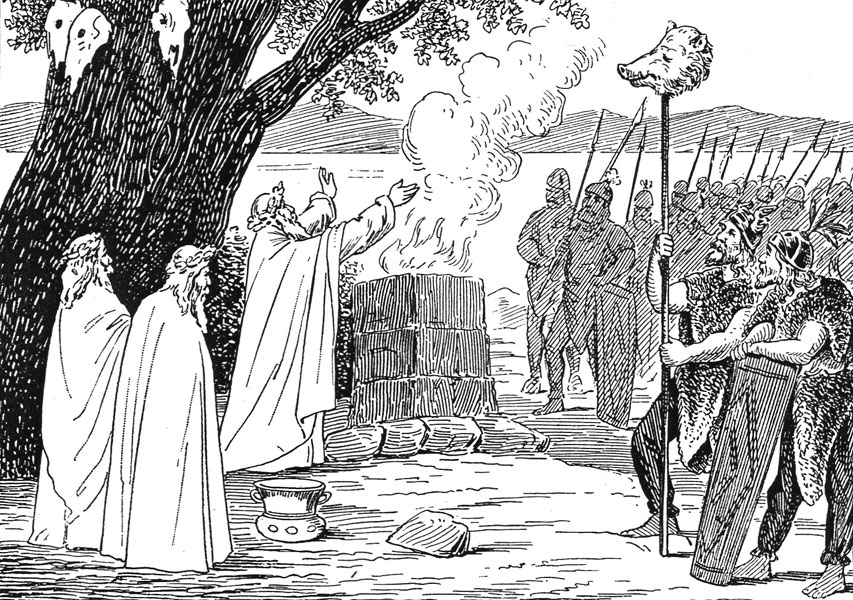
Slavs serving their Gods, a 19th-century woodcut

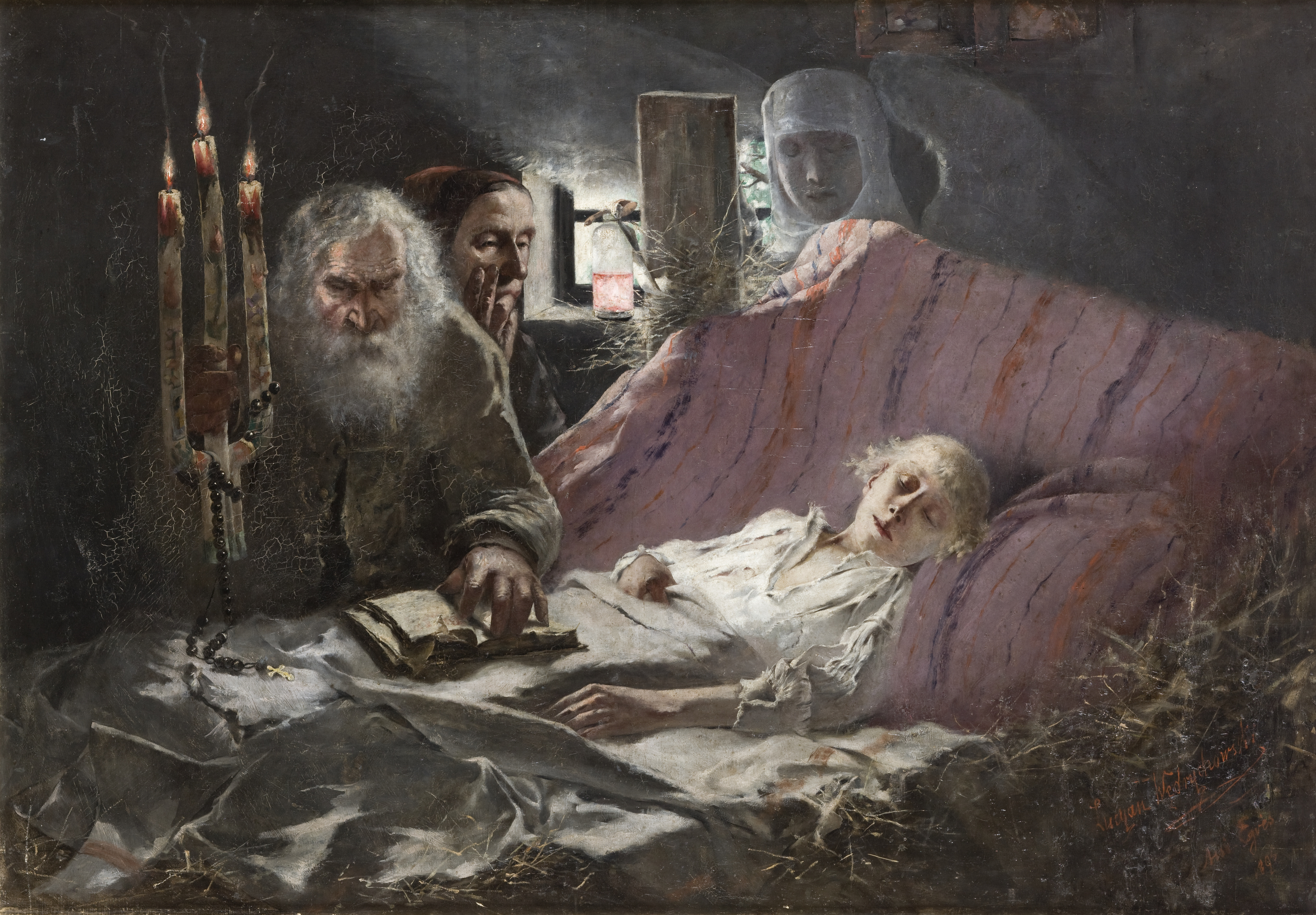
Znachor, Slavonic witch doctor, depicted on an 1895 Polish painting by Lucjan Wędrychowski

The cosmology of ancient Slavic religion, which is preserved in contemporary Slavic folk-religion, is visualised as a three-tiered vertical structure, or "world tree", as is common in other Indo-European religions. At the top there is the heavenly plane, symbolised by birds, the sun and the moon; the middle plane is that of earthly humanity, symbolised by bees and men; at the bottom of the structure there is the netherworld, symbolised by snakes and beavers, and by the chthonic god Veles. The Zbruch Idol found in western Ukraine (which was at first identified as a representation of Svetovid) represents this theo-cosmology: the three-layered effigy of the four major deities—Perun, Dazhbog, Mokosh and Lada—is constituted by a top level with four figures representing them, facing the four cardinal directions; a middle level with representations of a human ritual community (khorovod); and a bottom level with the representation of a three-headed chthonic god, Veles, who sustains the entire structure.

The scholar Jiří Dynda studied the figure of Triglav (literally "the Three-Headed One") and Svetovid, which are widely attested in archaeological testimonies, as the respectively three-headed and four-headed representations of the same axis mundi, of the same supreme god. Triglav itself was connected to the symbols of the tree and the mountain, which are other common symbols of the axis mundi, and in this quality he was a summus deus (a sum of all things), as recorded by Ebbo (c. 775–851).

Triglav represents the vertical interconnection of the three worlds, reflected by the three social functions studied by Dumézil: sacerdotal, martial and economic. Ebbo himself documented that the Triglav was seen as embodying the connection and mediation between Heaven, Earth and the underworld. Adam of Bremen (c. 1040s–1080s) described the Triglav of Wolin as Neptunus triplicis naturae (that is to say, "Neptune of the three natures/generations"), attesting the colours that were attributed to the three worlds, also studied by Karel Jaromír Erben (1811–1870): white for Heaven, green for Earth and black for the underworld.

The Triglav also represents the three dimensions of time, mythologically rendered in the figure of a three-stranded rope. Triglav is Perun in the heavenly plane, Svetovid in the centre from which the horizontal four directions unfold, and Veles the psychopomp in the underworld. Dynda interprets Svetovid as the incarnation of the axis mundi in the four dimensions of space. Helmold defined Svetovid as deus deorum ("god of all gods").

Alongside Triglav and Svetovid, other deities were also represented with many heads. This is attested by chroniclers who wrote about West Slavs, including Saxo Grammaticus (c. 1160–1220). According to him, Rugievit in Charenza was represented with seven faces, which converged at the top in a single crown. These three-, four- or many-headed images, wooden or carved in stone, some covered in metal, which held drinking horns and were decorated with solar symbols and horses, were kept in temples, of which numerous archaeological remains have been found.

The temples were built on upraised platforms, frequently on hills, but also at the confluences of rivers. The biographers of Otto of Bamberg (1060/1061–1139) inform that these temples were known as continae, "dwellings", among West Slavs, testifying that they were regarded as the houses of the gods. They were wooden buildings with an inner cell with the god's statue, located in wider walled enclosures or fortifications; such fortifications might contain up to four continae.

Different continae (Russian: контини) were owned by different kin-groups, and used for ritual banquets in honour of their own ancestor-gods. These ritual banquets are known variously, across Slavic countries, as bratchina (from brat, "brother"), mol'ba ("entreaty", "supplication") and kanun ("short religious service") in Russia; slava ("glorification") in Serbia; sobor ("assembly") and kurban ("sacrifice") in Bulgaria. With Christianisation, the ancestor-gods were replaced with Christian patron-saints.

There also existed holy places with no buildings, where the deity was believed to manifest in nature itself. Such locations were characterised by the combined presence of trees and springs, according to the description of one such site in Szczecin by Otto of Bamberg. A shrine of the same type in Kobarid, (in present-day Slovenia), was stamped out in a "crusade" as recently as 1331.

Usually, common people were not allowed into the presence of the images of their gods, the sight of which was a privilege of the priests. Many of these images were seen and described only in the moment of their violent destruction at the hands of the Christian missionaries. The priests (volkhvs), who kept the temples and led rituals and festivals, enjoyed a great degree of prestige; they received tributes and shares of military booties by the kins' chiefs.

Some of the stone idols of the northeastern Slavs looked like mushrooms, without a face but with a clearly distinguished hat. Moreover, such idols were made by hand through turning a boulder upside-down and giving it the shape of a mushroom. The medieval manuscript of the 11th–14th centuries "The Word of St. Gregory, Invented in Toltsekh" contains a direct indication that the Slavs worshiped such phallic idols. According to some researchers, such idols were dedicated to Rod or Veles (according to local old folklore, stone mushrooms are dedicated to Veles).

Due to the fact that these idols had no face, they were not destroyed. According to the beliefs of the local population, such stone idols had healing properties, so they were regularly visited. On certain days, people brought gifts to them, and in order to receive healing from an illness, they had to sit on an idol. The stone mushroom was respected and protected. Disrespect towards this idol was not allowed. The keepers of traditions and rituals performed around the idol were elderly women, and the tradition passed down through generations.

There are also beliefs that such stone mushrooms provided fertility for the soil and for people. Therefore, in some places, the worship of these idols persisted for centuries until the end of the 20th century (and even after being transferred to a museum, elements of the rituals are still performed). The dating of stone mushrooms is only approximate, most dating back to about 1000 AD. The stone-mushroom idols are very similar to two Slavic stone idols from the northeastern regions: Sheksna idol (in Novgorod museum, Novgorod region, Russia) and Sebej idol (Sebej museum, Pskov region, Russia). These Slavic idols have a face and a phallic shape. Their characteristic feature is a hat.

An ancient Slavic stone idol was discovered on the territory of the Nikolo-Babaevsky monastery (Nekrasovsky district of the Yaroslavsky oblast) in 2020. An ancient pagan place that existed before the monastery and churches is mentioned in the ethnographic materials of Bogdanovich. In that place, on Babayki, the idol of the supreme heavenly god was worshiped. The discovered Babaevsky idol has a clear shape of a large mushroom, completely carved from a boulder. It is very similar to mushroom idols from the nearby settlements of Ples and Myshkin. Based on morphological details, the multifaceted cult function of this idol is assumed—fertility not only for the land and forest, but also fertility for humans.

== History ==
=== Amongst the South Slavs ===
A form of the ancient, Slavic polytheistic religion was practised by the South Slavs (including the Croats and Serbs) prior to Christianisation. They came into contact with Christianity during the reign of emperor Heraclius (610-641), continued by Rome, and baptization process ended during the rule of Basil I (867-886) by Byzantine missionaries of Constantinople Cyril and Methodius.

=== Kievan Rus' official religion and popular cults ===
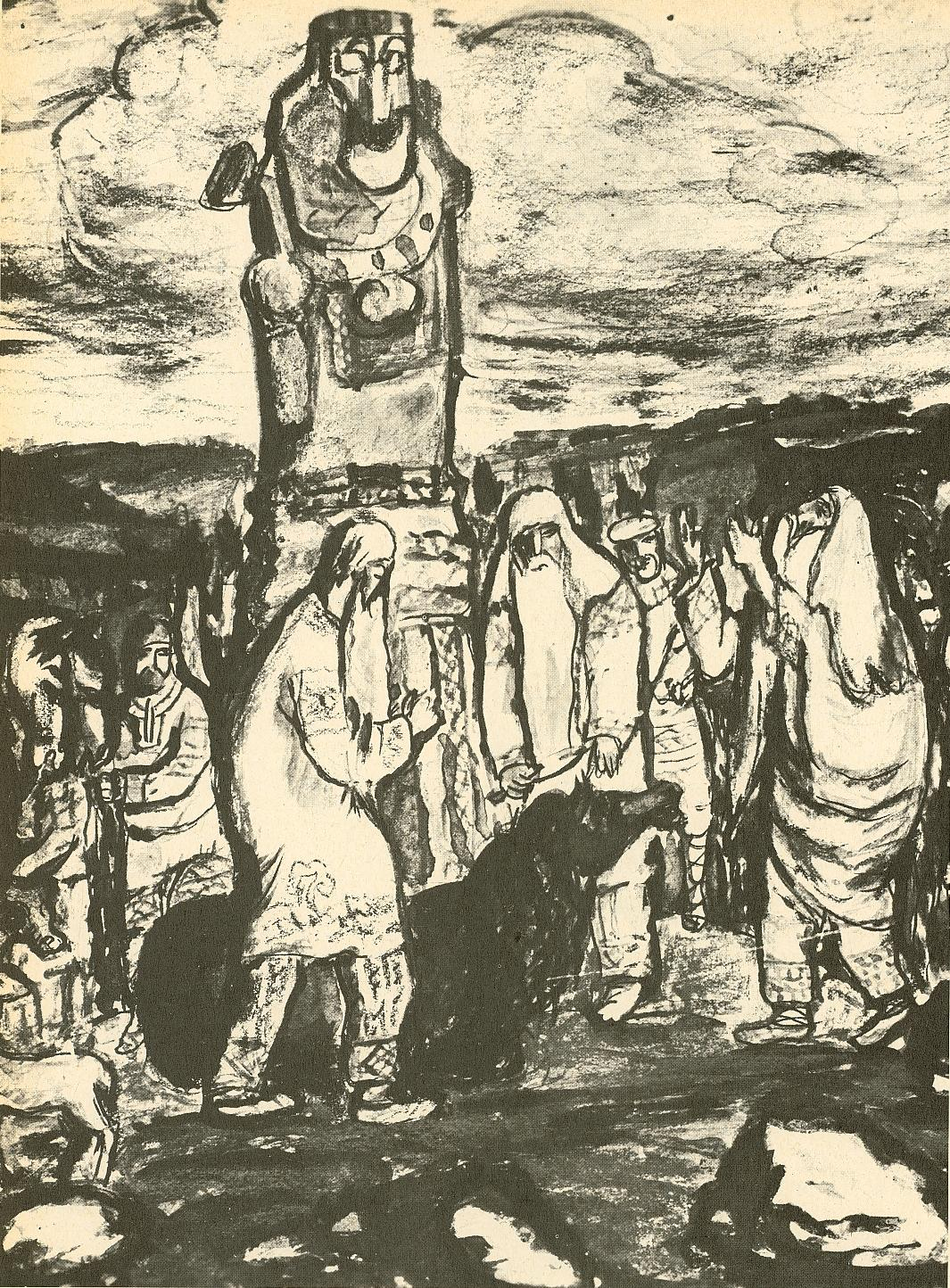
A Polish depiction of Veles from 1900 by A. Czeko-Potocka

In 980 CE, in Kievan Rus', led by the Great Prince Vladimir, there was an attempt to unify the various beliefs and priestly practices of Slavic religion in order to bind together the Slavic peoples in the growing centralised state. Vladimir canonised a number of deities, to whom he erected a temple on the hills of the capital Kiev. These deities, recorded in the Primary Chronicle, were five: Perun, Xors Dazhbog, Stribog, Simargl and Mokosh. Various other deities were worshipped by the common people, notably Veles who had a temple in the merchant's district of Podil of the capital itself. According to scholars, Vladimir's project consisted of a number of reforms that he had already started by the 970s, and which were aimed at preserving the traditions of the kins and making Kiev the spiritual centre of East Slavdom.

Perun was the god of thunder, law and war, symbolised by the oak and the mallet (or throwing stones), and identified with the Baltic Perkunas, the Germanic Thor and the Vedic Indra among others; his cult was practised not so much by commoners but mainly by the aristocracy. Veles was the god of horned livestock (Skotibog), of wealth and of the underworld. Perun and Veles symbolised an oppositional and yet complementary duality similar to that of the Vedic Mitra and Varuna, an eternal struggle between heavenly and chthonic forces. Roman Jakobson himself identified Veles as the Vedic Varuna, god of oaths and of the world order. This belief in a cosmic duality was likely the reason that led to the exclusion of Veles from Vladimir's official temple in Kiev. Xors Dazhbog ("Radiant Giving-God") was the god of the life-bringing power of the sun. Stribog was identified by E. G. Kagarov as the god of wind, storm and dissension. Mokosh, the only female deity in Vladimir's pantheon, is interpreted as meaning the "Wet" or "Moist" by Jakobson, identifying her with the Mat Syra Zemlya ("Damp Mother Earth") of later folk religion.

According to Ivanits, written sources from the Middle Ages "leave no doubt whatsoever" that the common Slavic peoples continued to worship their indigenous deities and hold their rituals for centuries after Kievan Rus' official baptism into Christianity, and the lower clergy of the newly formed Orthodox Christian church often joined the celebrations. The high clergy repeatedly condemned, through official admonitions, the worship of Rod and the Rozhanitsy ("God and the Goddesses", or "Generation and the generatrixes") with offerings of bread, porridge, cheese and mead. Scholars of Russian religion define Rod as the "general power of birth and reproduction" and the Rozhanitsy as the "mistresses of individual destiny". Kagarov identified the later Domovoi, the god of the household and kinship ancestry, as a specific manifestation of Rod. Other gods attested in medieval documents remain largely mysterious, for instance Lada and her sons Lel and Polel, who are often identified by scholars with the Greek gods Leda or Leto and her twin sons Castor and Pollux. Other figures who in medieval documents are often presented as deities, such as Kupala and Koliada, were rather the personifications of the spirits of agrarian holidays.

=== Christianisation of the East Slavs ===
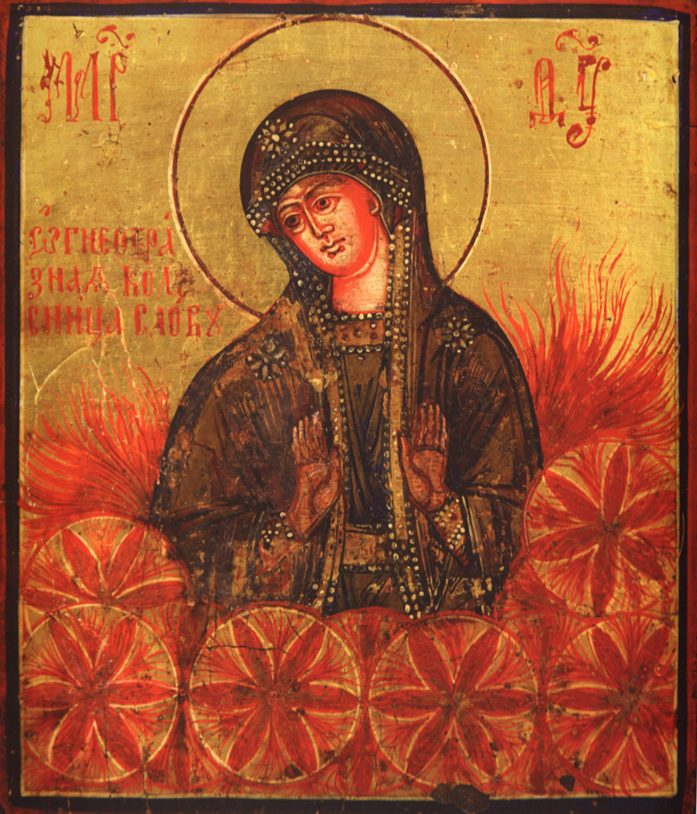
The Fiery Chariot of the Word—19th-century Russian icon of the Theotokos as Ognyena Maria ("Fiery Mary"), fire goddess sister of Perun, and a glaring example of Slavic religious themes in Christianised fashion. Belief in a mother goddess as receptacle of life, Mat Syra Zemlya ("Damp Mother Earth"), was preserved in Russian folk religion up to the 20th century, often disguised as the Virgin Mary of Christianity. The fiery "six-petaled roses" that surround the Ognyena are one of the variants of the whirling symbol of the supreme God (Rod).

==== Vladimir's baptism, popular resistance and syncretism ====
In 988, Vladimir of Kievan Rus' rejected Slavic religion and he and his subjects were officially baptised into the Eastern Orthodox Church, then the state religion of the Byzantine Empire. According to legend, Vladimir sent delegates to foreign states to determine what was the most convincing religion to be adopted by Kiev. Joyfulness and beauty were the primary characteristics of pre-Christian Slavic ceremonies, and the delegates sought something capable of matching these qualities. They were crestfallen by the Islamic religion of Volga Bulgaria, where they found "no joy ... but sorrow and great stench", and by Western Christianity (then the Catholic Church) where they found "many worship services, but nowhere ... beauty". Those who visited Constantinople were instead impressed by the arts and rituals of Byzantine Christianity. According to the Primary Chronicle, after the choice was made Vladimir commanded that the Slavic temple on the Kiev hills be destroyed and the effigies of the gods be burned or thrown into the Dnieper. Slavic temples were destroyed throughout the lands of Kievan Rus' and Christian churches were built in their places.

According to Ivakhiv, Christianisation was stronger in what is today western and central Ukraine, lands close to the capital Kiev. Slavic religion persisted, however, especially in northernmost regions of Slavic settlement, in what is today the central part of European Russia, such as the areas of Novgorod, Suzdal and Belozersk. In the core regions of Christianisation themselves the common population remained attached to the volkhvs, the priests, who periodically, over centuries, led popular rebellions against the central power and the Christian church. Christianisation was a very slow process among the Slavs, and the official Christian church adopted a policy of co-opting pre-Christian elements into Slavic Christianity. Christian saints were identified with Slavic gods—for instance, the figure of Perun was overlapped with that of Saint Elias, Veles was identified with Saint Blasius, and Yarilo became Saint George—and Christian festivals were set on the same dates as pagan ones.

Another feature of early Slavic Christianity was the strong influence of apocryphal literature, which became evident by the thirteenth century with the rise of Bogomilism among the South Slavs. South Slavic Bogomilism produced a large amount of apocryphal texts and their teachings later penetrated into Russia, and would have influenced later Slavic folk religion. Bernshtam tells of a "flood" of apocryphal literature in eleventh- to fifteenth-century Russia, which might not have been controlled by the still-weak Russian Orthodox Church.

==== Continuity of Slavic religion in Russia up to the 15th century ====
Some scholars have highlighted how the "conversion of Rus" took place no more than eight years after Vladimir's reform of Slavic religion in 980; according to them, Christianity in general did not have "any deep influence ... in the formation of the ideology, culture and social psychology of archaic societies" and the introduction of Christianity in Kiev "did not bring about a radical change in the consciousness of the society during the entire course of early Russian history". It was portrayed as a mass and conscious conversion only by half a century later, by the scribes of the Christian establishment. According to some scholars, the replacement of Slavic temples with Christian churches and the "baptism of Rus" has to be understood in continuity with the foregoing chain of reforms of Slavic religion launched by Vladimir, rather than as a breaking point.

V. G. Vlasov quotes the respected scholar of Slavic religion E. V. Anichkov, who, regarding Russia's Christianisation, said:

Christianization of the countryside was the work, not of the eleventh and twelfth, but of the fifteenth and sixteenth or even seventeenth century.

According to Vlasov the ritual of baptism and mass conversion undergone by Vladimir in 988 was never repeated in the centuries to follow, and mastery of Christian teachings was never accomplished on the popular level even by the start of the twentieth century. According to him, a nominal, superficial identification with Christianity was possible with the superimposition of a Christianised agrarian calendar ("Christmas–Easter–Whitsunday") over the indigenous complex of festivals, "Koliada–Yarilo–Kupala". The analysis of the Christianised agrarian and ritual calendar, combined with data from popular astronomy, leads to determine that the Julian calendar associated with the Orthodox Church was adopted by Russian peasants between the sixteenth and seventeenth century. It was by this period that much of the Russian population became officially part of the Orthodox Church and therefore nominally Christians. This occurred as an effect of a broader complex of phenomena which Russia underwent by the fifteenth century, that is to say radical changes towards a centralisation of state power, which involved urbanisation, bureaucratisation and the consolidation of serfdom of the peasantry.

That the vast majority of the Russian population was not Christian back in the fifteenth century may possibly be evidenced by archaeology: according to Vlasov, mound (kurgan) burials, which do not reflect Christian norms, were "a universal phenomenon in Russia up to the fifteenth century", and persisted into the 1530s. Moreover, chronicles from that period, such as the Pskov Chronicles, and archaeological data collected by N. M. Nikolsky, testify that back in the fifteenth century there were still "no rural churches for the general use of the populace; churches existed only at the courts of boyars and princes". It was only by the sixteenth century that the Russian Orthodox Church grew as a powerful, centralising institution taking the Catholic Church of Rome as a model, and the distinctiveness of a Slavic folk religion became evident. The church condemned "heresies" and tried to eradicate the "false half-pagan" folk religion of the common people, but these measures coming from the centres of church power were largely ineffective, and on the local level creative syntheses of folk religious rituals and holidays continued to thrive.

==== Sunwise Slavic religion, withershins Christianity, and Old Belief ====
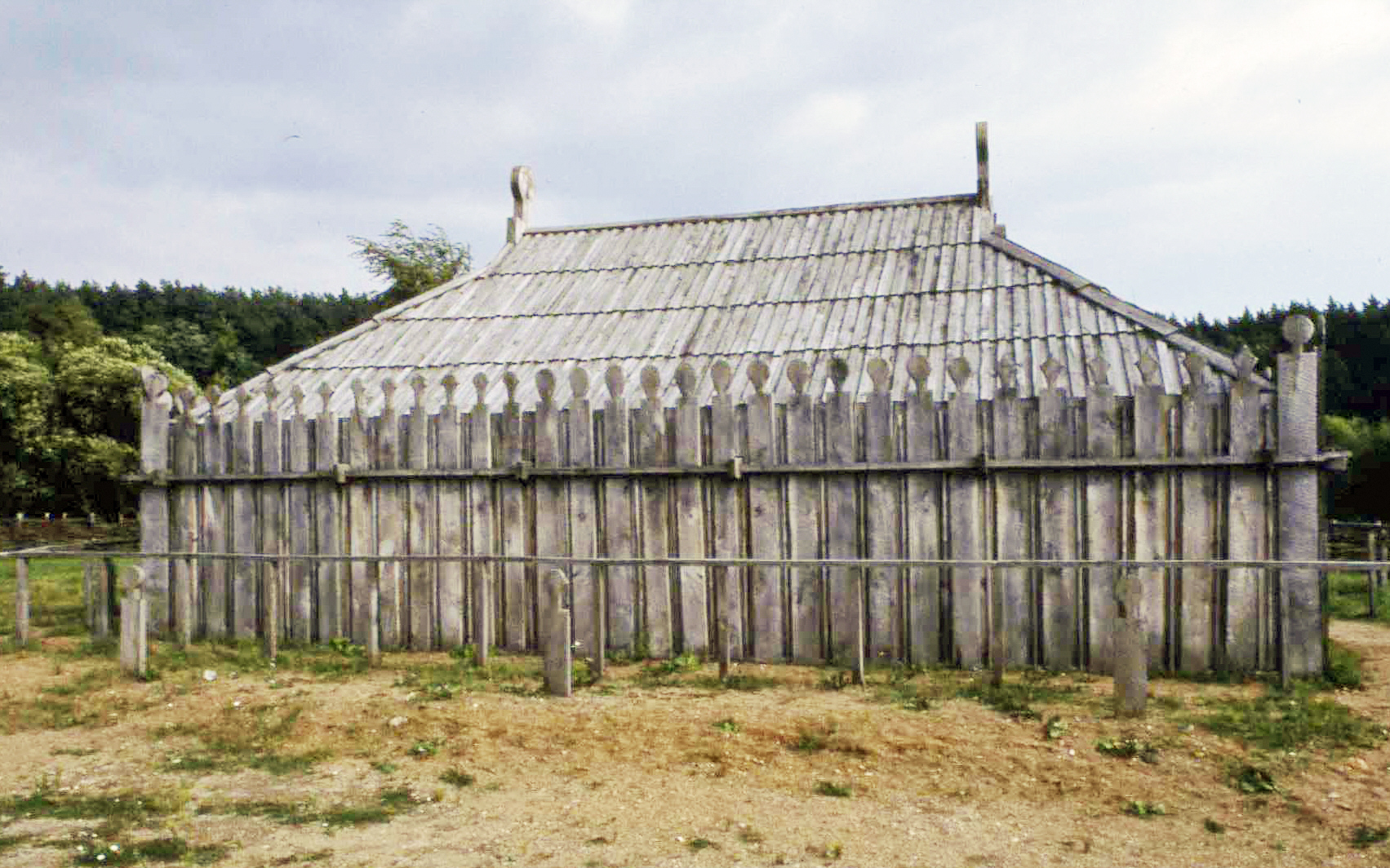
Reconstructed hipped-roofed Slavic temple at Groß Raden Museum

When the incorporation of the Russian population into Christianity became substantial in the middle of the sixteenth century, the Russian Orthodox Church absorbed further elements of pre-Christian and popular tradition and underwent a transformation of its architecture, with the adoption of the hipped roof which was traditionally associated with pre-Christian Slavic temples. The most significant change, however, was the adoption of the sunwise—or clockwise—direction in Christian ritual procession.

Christianity is characterised by withershins ritual movement, that is to say, movement against the course of the sun. This was also the case in Slavic Christianity before the sixteenth century. Sunwise movements are instead characteristic of Slavic religion, evident in the khorovod, ritual circle-dance, which magically favours the development of things. Withershins movement was employed in popular rituals, too, though only in those occasions when it was considered worthwhile to act against the course of nature, in order to alter the state of affairs.

When Patriarch Nikon of Moscow launched his reform of the Orthodox Church in 1656, he restored the withershins ritual movement. This was among the changes that led to a schism (raskol) within Russian Orthodoxy, between those who accepted the reforms and the Old Believers, who preserved instead the "ancient piety" derived from indigenous Slavic religion. A large number of Russians and ethnic minorities converted to the movement of the Old Believers, in the broadest meaning of the term—including a variety of folk religions—pointed out by Bernshtam, and these Old Believers were a significant part of the settlers of broader European Russia and Siberia throughout the second half of the seventeenth century, which saw the expansion of the Russian state in these regions. Old Believers were distinguished by their cohesion, literacy and initiative, and constantly emerging new religious sects tended to identify themselves with the movement. This posed a great hitch to the Russian Orthodox Church's project of thorough Christianisation of the masses. Veletskaya highlighted how the Old Believers have preserved early Slavic pagan ideas and practices such as the veneration of fire as a channel to the divine world, the symbolism of the colour red, the search for a "glorious death", and more in general the holistic vision of a divine cosmos.

=== Christianisation of the West Slavs ===
In the opinion of Norman Davies, the Christianisation of Poland through the Czech–Polish alliance represented a conscious choice on the part of Polish rulers to ally themselves with the Czech state rather than the German one. The Moravian cultural influence played a significant role in the spread of Christianity onto the Polish lands and the subsequent adoption of that religion. Christianity arrived around the late 9th century, most likely around the time when the Vistulan tribe encountered the Christian rite in dealings with their neighbours, the Great Moravia (Bohemian) state. The "Baptism of Poland" refers to the ceremony when the first ruler of the Polish state, Mieszko I and much of his court, converted to Christianity on the Holy Saturday of 14 April 966.

In the eleventh century, Slavic pagan culture was "still in full working order" among the West Slavs. Christianity faced popular opposition, including an uprising in the 1030s (particularly intense in the years of 1035–1037). By the twelfth century, however, under the pressure of Germanisation, Catholicism was forcefully imposed through the Northern Crusades, and temples and images of Slavic religion were violently destroyed. West Slavic populations held out vigorously against Christianisation. One of the most famous instances of popular resistance occurred at the temple-stronghold of Svetovid at Cape Arkona, in Rugia. The temple at Arkona had a squared groundplan, with an inner hall sustained by four pillars which contained Svetovid's statue. The latter had four heads, shown beardless and cleanshaven after the Rugian fashion. In its right hand the statue held a horn of precious metal, which was used for divination during the yearly great festival of the god. In 1168, Arkona surrendered to the Danish troops of King Valdemar I, and the bishop Absalon led the destruction of the temple of Svetovid.

=== Slavic folk religion ===
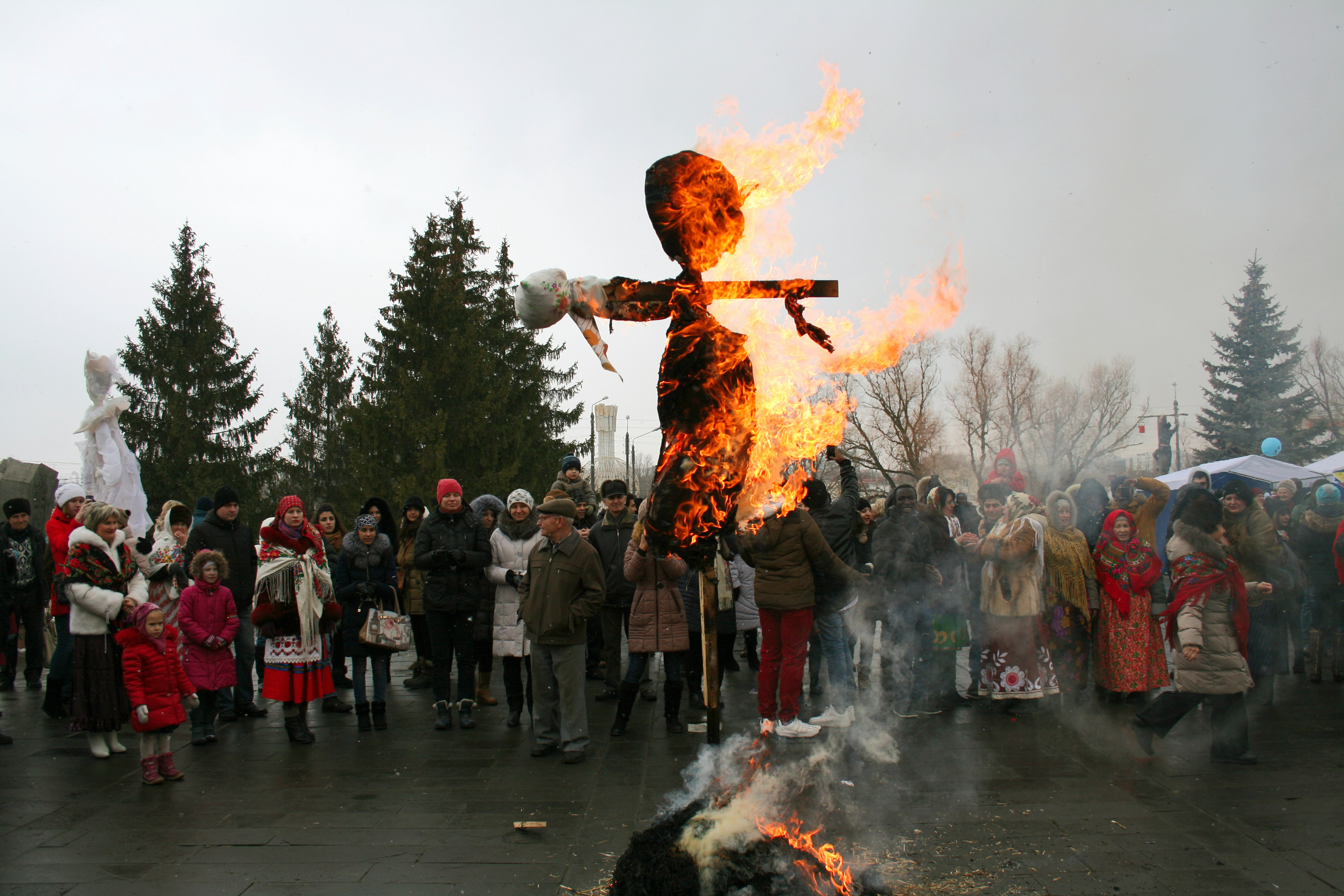
Burning the straw effigy of Marzanna, on Maslenitsa holiday, in Belgorod

Ethnography in late-nineteenth-century Ukraine documented a "thorough synthesis of pagan and Christian elements" in Slavic folk religion, a system often called "double belief" (Russian: dvoeverie, Ukrainian: dvovirya). According to Bernshtam, dvoeverie is still used to this day in scholarly works to define Slavic folk religion, which is seen by certain scholars as having preserved much of pre-Christian Slavic religion, "poorly and transparently" covered by a Christianity that may be easily "stripped away" to reveal more or less "pure" patterns of the original faith. Since the collapse of the Soviet Union there has been a new wave of scholarly debate on the subjects of Slavic folk religion and dvoeverie. A. E. Musin, an academic and deacon of the Russian Orthodox Church, published an article about the "problem of double belief" as recently as 1991. In this article he divides scholars between those who say that Russian Orthodoxy adapted to entrenched indigenous faith, continuing the Soviet idea of an "undefeated paganism", and those who say that Russian Orthodoxy is an out-and-out syncretic religion. Bernshtam challenges dualistic notions of dvoeverie and proposes interpreting broader Slavic religiosity as a mnogoverie ("multifaith") continuum, in which a higher layer of Orthodox Christian officialdom is alternated with a variety of "Old Beliefs" among the various strata of the population.

According to Ivanits, nineteenth- and twentieth-century Slavic folk religion's central concern was fertility, propitiated with rites celebrating death and resurrection. Scholars of Slavic religion who focused on nineteenth-century folk religion were often led to mistakes such as the interpretation of Rod and Rozhanitsy as figures of a merely ancestral cult; however, in medieval documents Rod is equated with the ancient Egyptian god Osiris, representing a broader concept of natural generativity. Belief in the holiness of Mat Syra Zemlya ("Damp Mother Earth") is another feature that has persisted into modern Slavic folk religion; up to the twentieth century, Russian peasants practiced a variety of rituals devoted to her and confessed their sins to her in the absence of a priest. Ivanits also reports that in the region of Vladimir old people practiced a ritual asking Earth's forgiveness before their death. A number of scholars attributed the Russians' particular devotion to the Theotokos, the "Mother of God", to this still powerful pre-Christian substratum of devotion to a great mother goddess.

Ivanits attributes the tenacity of synthetic Slavic folk religion to an exceptionality of Slavs and of Russia in particular, compared to other European countries; "the Russian case is extreme", she says, because Russia—especially the vastness of rural Russia—neither lived the intellectual upheavals of the Renaissance, nor the Reformation, nor the Age of Enlightenment, which severely weakened folk spirituality in the rest of Europe.

Slavic folk religious festivals and rites reflect the times of the ancient pagan calendar. For instance, the Christmas period is marked by the rites of Koliada, characterised by the element of fire, processions and ritual drama, offerings of food and drink to the ancestors. Spring and summer rites are characterised by fire- and water-related imagery spinning around the figures of the gods Yarilo, Kupala and Marzanna. The switching of seasonal spirits is celebrated through the interaction of effigies of these spirits and the elements which symbolise the coming season, such as by burning, drowning or setting the effigies onto water, and the "rolling of burning wheels of straw down into rivers".

=== Modern Rodnovery ===
Since the early twentieth century there has been a reinvention and reinstitutionalisation of "Slavic religion" in the so-called movement of "Rodnovery", literally "Slavic Native Faith". The movement draws from ancient Slavic folk religion, often combining it with philosophical underpinnings taken from other religions, mainly Hinduism. Some Rodnover groups focus almost exclusively on folk religions and the worship of gods at the right times of the year, while others have developed a scriptural core, represented by writings purported to be centuries-old documents such as the Book of Veles; writings which elaborate powerful national mythologemes such as the Maha Vira of Sylenkoism; and esoteric writings such as the Slavo-Aryan Vedas of Ynglism.

== Reconstructed calendar of celebrations ==
Linda J. Ivanits reconstructed a basic calendar of the celebrations of the most important Slavic gods among East Slavs, based on Boris Rybakov's studies on ancient agricultural calendars, especially a fourth-century one from an area around Kiev.

Festival	Date (Julian or Gregorian)	Deity celebrated	Overlapped Christian festival or figure
Yuletide (Koliada)	Winter solstice	Rod – first half Veles – second half	Christmas, Baptism of the Lord, Epiphany
Komoeditsa	Spring equinox	Veles	Shrovetide
Day of Young Shoots	May 2	—N/a	Saints Boris and Gleb
Semik	June 4	Yarilo	Green week
Rusalnaya Week	June 17–23	Simargl	Trinity Sunday
Kupala Night / Kupalo	June 24	—N/a	Saint John the Baptist
Festival of Perun	July 20	Rod—Perun	Saint Elijah
Harvest festivals	July 24 / September 9	Rodzanica—Rodzanicy	Feast of the Transfiguration (August 6) / Birthday of the Mother of God (September 8)
Festival of Mokosh	October 28	Mokosh	Saint Paraskeva's Friday

== Influence on Christian art and architecture ==
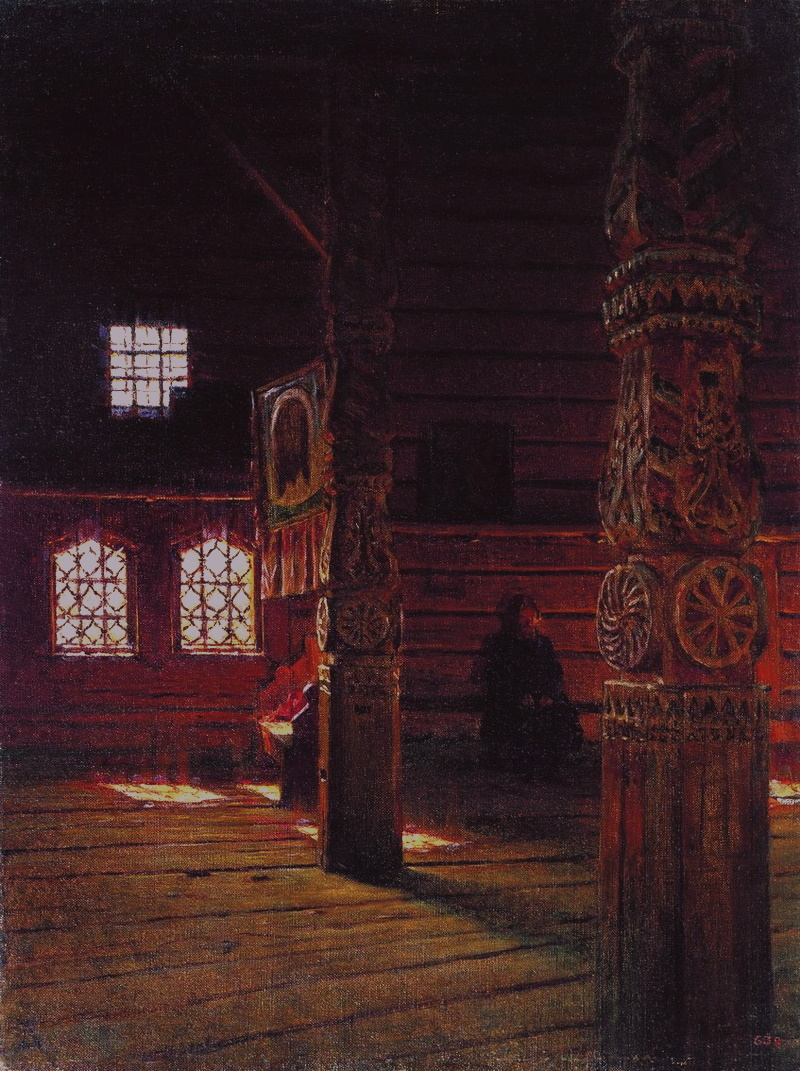
Vasily Vereshchagin. "Interior view of the wooden church of Peter and Paul in Puchug". 1894

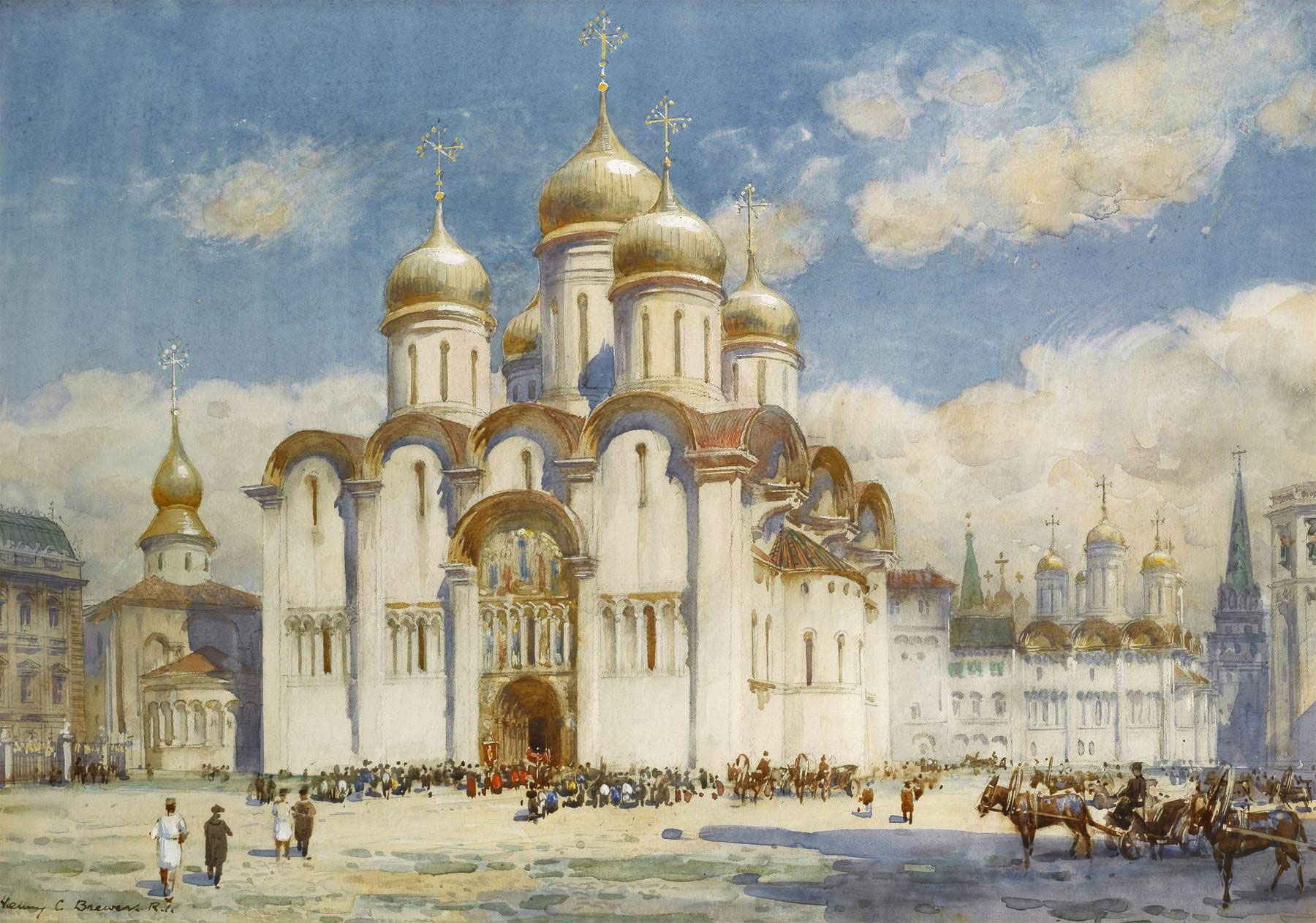
Henry Charles Brewer. "Assumption Cathedral of the Moscow Kremlin"

The Old Russian architecture of churches originates from the pre-Christian Slavic zodchestvo (Russian: зодчество - construction/architecture). This pagan style had a great influence on the entire architecture of ancient Russia, including the structure and decoration of churches and the art of icon painting.

On this occasion, the researcher Boris Grekov wrote:

Neither in Byzantium nor in the West can you find temples with a large number of domes. This is a purely old Russian phenomenon, a legacy of wooden architecture.

— Boris Grekov

The peculiarity of ancient Russian architecture was also manifested in the appearance of the domes themselves, the most famous of which is the onion dome.

The historian Alexander Zamaleev suggests that the orientation of ancient Russian architects on pagan foundations is explained primarily by the difference in building materials: in Byzantium, the construction of temples was carried out from stone and marble, while in ancient Russia wooden architecture prevailed. This choice of material also led to the emergence of many architectural trends, including the so-called "tent architecture". The earliest wooden churches in shape and plan were a square or oblong quadrangle with a tower-shaped dome planted on it, similar to those that were placed in ancient Russian fortresses. Above the dome, under the cross, another chapter was being built, resembling an onion.

Outside and inside the temples were decorated with various carvings, often in the traditions of the pagan style. Later, this tradition was transferred to the stone church architecture.

A distinctive feature of the Old Russian architectural thinking was the attraction to high-rise composition. This was manifested not only in the creation of tower-like churches (moreover, the "polydoming" and pyramidal composition, which was absent in the Byzantine culture, was highly appreciated), but also in the choice of a high place for religious buildings.

Most often, the vaults in the Old Russian churches are represented in the form of "kokoshniks" (semicircular vaults with a protruding sharp middle) and "zakomara" (semicircular protruding end of the outer section of the wall).

Meanwhile, Christianity had an impact on the Old Russian funeral rites: corpse-burning was replaced with burial. However, among the common population, there is a memory of triangular mounds piled up over the burned body of the deceased. Later, this custom developed into the construction of a "roof" over the cross, the so-called "golubets".

This style gained immense popularity in the Russian Empire, thereby reviving in the form of Neo-Russian architecture.

== See also ==
- Ancestor worship
- Proto-Indo-European religion
- Proto-Indo-Iranian religion
- Historical Vedic religion
- Finnish paganism
- Zagovory
- Rodnovery
- Outline of Slavic history and culture
- Werewolves in Slavic mythology
