= Rusalka Week =

Eastern Europe holiday

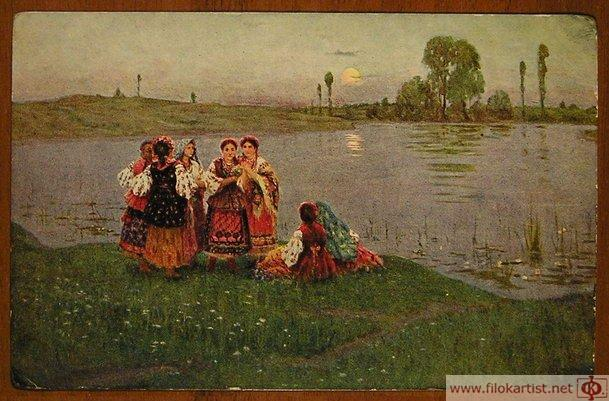
- Also called: Zelenyy, (Note: Ukrainian: Зелений, lit. 'Green') Klechalʹnyy, (Note: Ukrainian: Клечальний) Hryanyy, (Note: Ukrainian: Гряний) Troyitsʹkyy tyzhdenʹ (Note: Ukrainian: Троїцький тиждень, lit. 'Trinity Week')
- Observed by: Ukrainians
- Type: Folk Orthodoxy
- Date: The week after Pentecost

Rusalka Week (Ukrainian: Руса́льний ти́ждень, romanized: Rusal'nyy tyzhden'), also known as Rusalia (Ukrainian: Русалії), is a Ukrainian folk holiday held during the week after Pentecost, when, according to popular belief, rusalkas (mermaids) walk the earth. It was celebrated from Monday to Thursday. On the first Thursday after Trinity, mermaids celebrate their Easter. A week after Trinity, mermaids were solemnly sent out of the village. Trinity rites were supposed to add health to a person and fertility to the field, and protect the home from evil. It was believed that mermaids protected the fields, forests, and waters.

== Traditions and beliefs ==
Rusalka Week begins the day after Pentecost (Ukrainian: День Святої Трійці, romanized: Den' Sviatoyi Triytsi, lit. 'Day of the Holy Trinity'). Rusalia takes place in Ukraine accompanied by various ritual actions: dressing one of the girls as a mermaid, wearing wreaths, girding herself with a girdle made of grass or grain, dancing, singing mermaid songs, etc. In some places, Rusalka Week ended with a farewell of the mermaids - the expulsion of the mermaids or "mermaid games", that is, the end of the mermaid festivities and fun.

According to folk beliefs, during Mermaid Week, when the rye is in bloom, mermaids emerge from the water and roam the fields and forests. They hunt young men and women and can tickle them to death, or lure them into their underwater kingdom. It is especially dangerous to swim in rivers during this week, as mermaids will tickle them and leave them behind.

Lying in wait for a passerby on the outskirts of the village, the mermaid would ask him: “Wormwood or parsley?” (Ukrainian: «Полин чи петрушка?», romanized: «Polyn chi petrushka?»). If you answer “wormwood”, the mermaid would disappear, but if you answer “parsley,” she would say: “You are my darling!” (Ukrainian: «Ти моя душка!», romanized: «Ty moia dushka!») and could tickle you to death. The most common belief was that during Mermaid Week, the restless souls of girls that committed suicide or drowned, and who had turned into rusalkas, roamed the fields, forests, and ponds and rivers. Also on Rusalia, for mermaids and mermaids ("so that they could have fun and not get hurt"), girls would organize a ritual event - "wreath-making", which in some places was done on the Thursday before Trinity, and in others - after it. They would go to the forest in groups and weave wreaths of thin twigs on live birch trees, which were to be kept until Monday, when the mermaids were seen off.

Before going to the forest to pick grapes, in the morning they prepared ritual pies and eggs, which, as Vasyl Skurativsky writes in his book "Rusalia" (Ukrainian: Русалії), were mandatory in the Trinity rites.

Mermaids were popularly imagined as girls of supernatural beauty - with white or slightly bluish body color and luxurious flowing braids, dressed in transparent clothing or completely naked.

In some Ukrainian villages, there was a custom: at sunrise, girls would carry rye bread baked in holy water to the field. It was broken into small pieces and carried around the fields — “for the mermaids, so that the rye would bear fruit.” The girls wove wreaths, chose the most beautiful and slender one among them and decorated her with flowers and ribbons. As soon as the moon rose, in white shirts and necklaces, holding hands, they would go out of the village, and the “mermaid” they had chosen would walk in front. All the girls had their hair unbraided and a wreath on their heads.

The girls' march resembled a khorovod - the first pair raised their hands up, forming a kind of "gate", through which the other participants passed in pairs. The event was accompanied by mermaid songs, lighting a bonfire, over which the girls jumped. The boys also joined them. This is reminiscent of Kupala fun, but with the difference that the girls threw their wreaths at the boys and ran away. Instead, the "mermaid" tried to catch one of her friends and tickle her. At midnight, everyone returned to the village, believing that now the mermaids would be in their lands until the next May Easter.

== Days of the week ==
To prevent mermaids from harming people in the fields, on Mondays, peasants would organize “mermaid farewells.” In Polesie — the region where these relict rites have been most fully preserved — the custom of mermaid farewells was still in active use at the end of the 19th century.

On Wednesday and Thursday, it was considered better not to go anywhere at all. Mermaids were especially dangerous on Thursday - Rusalka Easter. On this day, mermaids and nyavky (mavky) walk through the fields, play near the water and on the edges of the forest - "their souls are set free." And this is the only time when they can take on human form and eat ordinary food. Therefore, in order not to fall into their hands, you need to carry a talisman with you - wormwood (Evshan-zillia) and lovage, which will drive them away. Houses were also cleaned with potions - for example, in the Kyiv region, fragrant herbs were collected and the floor in the house was covered with them, lovage was given special preference. Windows, images, and the penitential crypt were decorated with fragrant mint and silk grass. Outside, they were decorated with a tree - linden, maple. They placed branches on the gates, and the paths were covered with grass.

During Rusalka Week, especially on Thursday, women in all regions of Ukraine hung cloth on trees so that the nymphs would take it for their shirts.

On Rusalka Easter, "so as not to anger the souls of the dead," people were careful not to work, especially when sifting flour into a bowl — "because many mermaids will appear." In the morning, women baked Easter cakes and painted Easter eggs yellow, but they did not throw the egg shells into the water, as is done on Easter, "because a group of mermaids will gather around them." In some places, hot bread was placed on the windowsill, because it was believed that the steam and smell from it would make the mermaids full.

== See also ==
- Green week
