= Goryń =

Goryń may refer to:

== Places ==
- Goryń, Kuyavian-Pomeranian Voivodeship (north-central Poland)
- Goryń, Łódź Voivodeship (central Poland)
- Goryń, Masovian Voivodeship (east-central Poland)
- Goryń, Warmian-Masurian Voivodeship (north Poland)

== Music ==
- Goryń (singing group) - Belarusian singing group

== See also ==
- Horyn (disambiguation)
