= Goryń (singing group) =

Belarusian singing group

Goryń is a Belarusian singing group.

== History ==
Goryń was formed in 2008 by members of the Students' Ethnographic Association. The group has a diverse knowledge of music and had performed more than 20 times as of late 2014. While touring rural parts of Belarus, Goryń chose to perform without arrangements and incorporated specific features of regional dialect and singing styles in their performances. Their repertoire consists of songs from the Paleśsie region as well as from Central and Northern Belarus. The group attempts to preserve traditional culture in various urban environments, through the revival of regional festivals.

== Origin of the group's name ==
The word goryń was used in Belarus at the end of the nineteenth and beginning of the twentieth centuries to describe the red cotton embroidery threads often sold by Jews and Gypsies in Belarusian villages. The word comes from the German garn, which means "yarn".

The word "goryń", "garyna" or "gorynka" is still used in some parts of Belarus and the red woven threads have become symbolic and meaningful in national Belarusian costume alongside its musical associations.

== Discography ==
=== Da padaj, Boža, klučy... (2012) ===
Da padaj, Boža, klučy. 2012

Songs of a spring cycle. A Candlemas song starts the album. There are also songs dedicated to Hukańnie viasny, Easter, Jurja, and Rusalle, along with other songs related to the spring season.

==== Track listing ====
1. Na mory vutka kupałasia (Candlemas) (Baranava village, Staryja Darohi district)
2. Sam Boh piva varyć (spring) (Siberia (from migrants from Mahiloŭ hubiernija))
3. Oj, i chto z-za vorot kliče (spring) (Černičy village, Žytkavičy district)
4. Vołotarр (Easter) (Pinsk district)
5. Čyj to dvor na pahuračku (Easter) (Hałany village, Tałačyn district)
6. Za novaju śviatlicaju (spring) (Kančany village, Vierchniadźvinsk district)
7. Šoś u lesie hukaje (spring) (Kazły village, Jelsk district)
8. Cieraz haj zielanieńki (spring) (Mahiloŭ district)
9. Riddle
10. Ja skakała-plasała (spring) (Staŭbun village, Vietka district)
11. Jšła Jurova maci mastami (Jurja) (Hlinnaja Słabada village, Rečyca district)
12. Da my Jurja pačynajem (Jurja) (Fieliksova village, Lida district)
13. Na vulicy, na šyrokaj (Jurja) (Fieliksova village, Lida district)
14. Praviadu rusalačku ja da boru (rusalnaja) (Paličyn village, Lubań district)
15. Jak pajdu ja maładziusieńka (Trinity) (Kančany village, Vierchniadźvinsk district)

== Members ==
- Halina Druk
- Nasta Hłuško
- Natalla Jarmalinskaja
- Taciana Lukjanava
- Aŭhińnia Suchavierchava
- Julija Litvinava (past member)
- Hanna Jakuš (past member)

== Performances at festivals ==
=== 2011 ===
- Cukierkavy Fest (Ivianiec, Belarus)

=== 2013 ===
- Bahač (Viazynka, Belarus)
- VIII International Folklore Festival "Pokrovskye Kolokola" (Pokrov Bells) (Vilnius, Lithuania)

=== 2014 ===
- Hukańnie Viasny (Viazynka, Belarus)
- Regional Fest of Traditional Culture "Zialonyja śviatki" (Mahiloŭ, Belarus)
- "Kreva Ceramic" Fest (Kreva, Belarus)
- Folk-fest "Kamianica" (Aziarco, Belarus)
- Bahač (Viazynka, Belarus)
