= Unclean dead in Slavic mythology =

Slavic folklore regarding those who died unnatural deaths

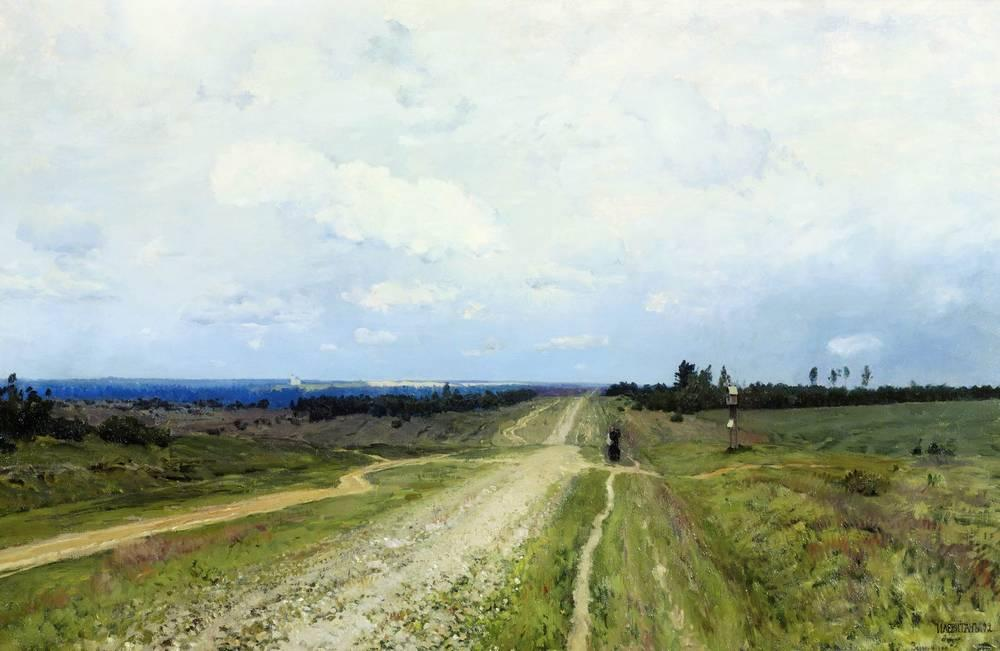
A cross with a «golubets» at a crossroads. (Isaac Levitan. Vladimirka. 1892)

The unclean dead, (Note: Russian: нечистые покойники, мертвяки, нави, навь, romanized: nechistyye pokoyniki, mertvyaki, navi, nav’; Belarusian: наўцы, наўкі, romanized: naŭcy, naŭki; Ukrainian: мавки, нявки, romanized: mavky, niavky; Bulgarian: навье, навлянци, навои, навяци, romanized: navie, navlyantsi, navoi, navyatsi; Serbian: навjе, romanized: nawje; Slovene: navje, mavje; Polish: nawie.) according to Slavic folklore, are those who died an unnatural death and did not find peace after death. They were believed to return to the world of the living and continue their existence on earth as malevolent mythical beings.

In Russian ethnography, the term zalozhnye pokoiniki (Russian: заложные покойники) is also used to describe these beings; it was introduced into scholarly discourse in the early 20th century by ethnographer Dmitry Zelenin, as the "unclean dead" had no single name common across all Slavic traditions.

It was believed that the soul of a so-called "restless" (Russian: неупокоенный) dead could not pass on to the afterlife and therefore wandered the earth. According to Slavic folklore, such dead could turn into malevolent spirits.

== "Zalozhny dead" in Russian ethnography ==
The term "zalozhny dead" was introduced to scholarly usage in the early 20th century by ethnographer Dmitry Zelenin, who borrowed it from the Vyatka dialectal lexicon to designate an "unclean," "walking" corpse; this expression is not recorded in other Russian dialects. He linked the origin of the word “zalozhny” to the burial method itself: the body was placed face down in the coffin, and the grave was sealed with stones and branches (hence the term “zalozhny”, coming from the verb "zakladyvat'", which means "to block up”). "Zalozhny dead" were typically considered to be those who died violently, suicides, drunken deaths, drowning victims, unbaptized children, sorcerers, and witches.

== Burial practices ==
Unlike the "ordinary" dead, the so-called "parents" (i.e., the community's own), the "unclean dead" were not buried in the ground and not interred in cemeteries. Rather, they were buried outside the territory of a church, in places such as at crossroads, field boundaries, forests, swamps, or ravines, since it was believed that they were "cursed by their parents and the earth would not receive them."

Among the Eastern Slavs, it was customary to bury such deceased along the roadsides, especially at crossroads, and also along field boundaries. In Kievan Rus', there was a pre-Christian custom of collecting the ashes of the deceased into a vessel after cremation and leaving them on roadside posts.

Despite the opposition of the church to such practices (for example, Serapion of Vladimir condemned the pagan custom of digging up the bodies of drowned or hanged people in the event of disasters, while Joseph of Volokolamsk established the practice of performing funeral rites for the "unclean" dead, founding the Bogoradny Monastery in the village of Spirovo, where they were buried), these beliefs were so deeply rooted that eventually separate cemeteries (skudelnitsy, or "paupers’ graves") appeared. These were simple plots fenced with planks or stakes.

== Folk beliefs ==
In Simbirsk, there was a belief that during a drought, "one must certainly find a drunkard that the earth refuses to accept, so one must dig it up and throw it into a swamp so that rain may come." Similar accounts exist about other regions, including those where drought never occurred.

Besides drought, the unclean dead were thought to cause other harm. For example, one well-known legend tells of tells of Baturk, a man who was said to have been extremely greedy. Therefore, to satisfy his greed, a passersby had to leave offerings at his burial spot, otherwise he would bring disease upon them and their livestock. Numerous other tales survive about unclean dead frightening both animals and people.

In Belarus, places of violent death were considered unclean, and passersby would throw stones, tree branches, tufts of straw, or handfuls of earth onto such places "lest the deceased chase them." Outside of Belarus, the custom of throwing objects on the grave of an unclean dead was also recorded in the Vilna, Pskov, Olonets, Saratov, Volhynia, Chernigov, Poltava and Kharkov Governorates. In the Kharkov Governorate, it was believed that throwing something on the grave of a "pawned deceased" was thereby participating in the burial and rendering the deceased proper funeral honors.

== Mythological figures ==
- Rusalka — Dmitry Zelenin equated unclean dead with rusalkas. Meanwhile, Soviet ethnographer Sergei Tokarev argued that the image of the rusalka as a girl living in water, or in a field or forest, which emerged in the 18th century, combined folklore about water spirits (such as vodyanitsy, bereginyas, etc.), the unclean dead, and fertility spirits.
- Upyr — an "unclean" dead person, most often a deceased sorcerer who returned as an undead being.
- Mavka — a malevolent spirit akin to rusalkas and the Carpatho-Ukrainian "forest maidens" or female mountain spirits. It was believed that mavkas were formed from stillborn children, unbaptized infants, or those who died during Green week.

== See also ==
- Nav (Slavic folklore)
