= Horyn (disambiguation) =

Horyn is a tributary of the Pripyat River which flows through Ukraine and Belarus.

Horyń may also refer to:

- Bohdan Horyn (born 1936), Ukrainian politician
- Cathy Horyn (born 1956), American fashion critic and journalist
- Mykhailo Horyn (1930–2013), Ukrainian politician
- Mykola Horyn (born 1945), Governor of Lviv Oblast, Ukraine (1994–1997)

== See also ==
- Goryń (disambiguation)
