= Students' Ethnographic Association =

Belarusian non-governmental youth organisation

Students' Ethnographic Association (SEA)
- Formation: August 1998 Minsk, Belarus
- Type: Non-governmental organization
- Headquarters: 220036, vulica Karła Libkniechta 112, Minsk, Belarus phone + 375 17 208 20 90 fax + 375 17 208 44 28
- Region served: Belarus
- Leader: Alaksiej Hłuško
- Website: set.ethno.by set@ethno.by

Students' Ethnographic Association (SEA) (Belarusian: Студэ́нцкае этнаграфі́чнае тавары́ства (СЭТ)) is a Belarusian non-governmental youth organisation, founded in August 1998. It is recognised by UNESCO as an expert in the field of intangible cultural heritage. The Council of SEA operates in Miensk, where the headquarters are situated. The Association also has its branches in Grodno, Vitebsk and Mogilev.

== Aims and activities ==
The organization is focused on preserving and developing the cultural traditions of Belarus, as well as the country's natural and cultural landscape. Its activities include:

- organisation of ethnographic expeditions;
- organisation of traditional holidays and ceremonies, participation in holidays, which take part in authentic surroundings;
- organisation of summer camps, workshops and educational courses on traditional crafts;
- learning traditional songs and dances;
- organisation of exhibitions and festivals;
- publication of folklore materials in printed and electronic forms;
- organisation of meetings, lectures, seminars, creation of scientific and educational literature;
- organisation of ecological actions, protection of landscapes and architectural monuments;
- promotion of traditional culture in medias;
- participation in international festivals, holidays and summer schools.

=== Hukańnie viasny spring festival ===
Hukańnie viasny festival is organised annually in Viazynka and is designed to greet the coming spring.

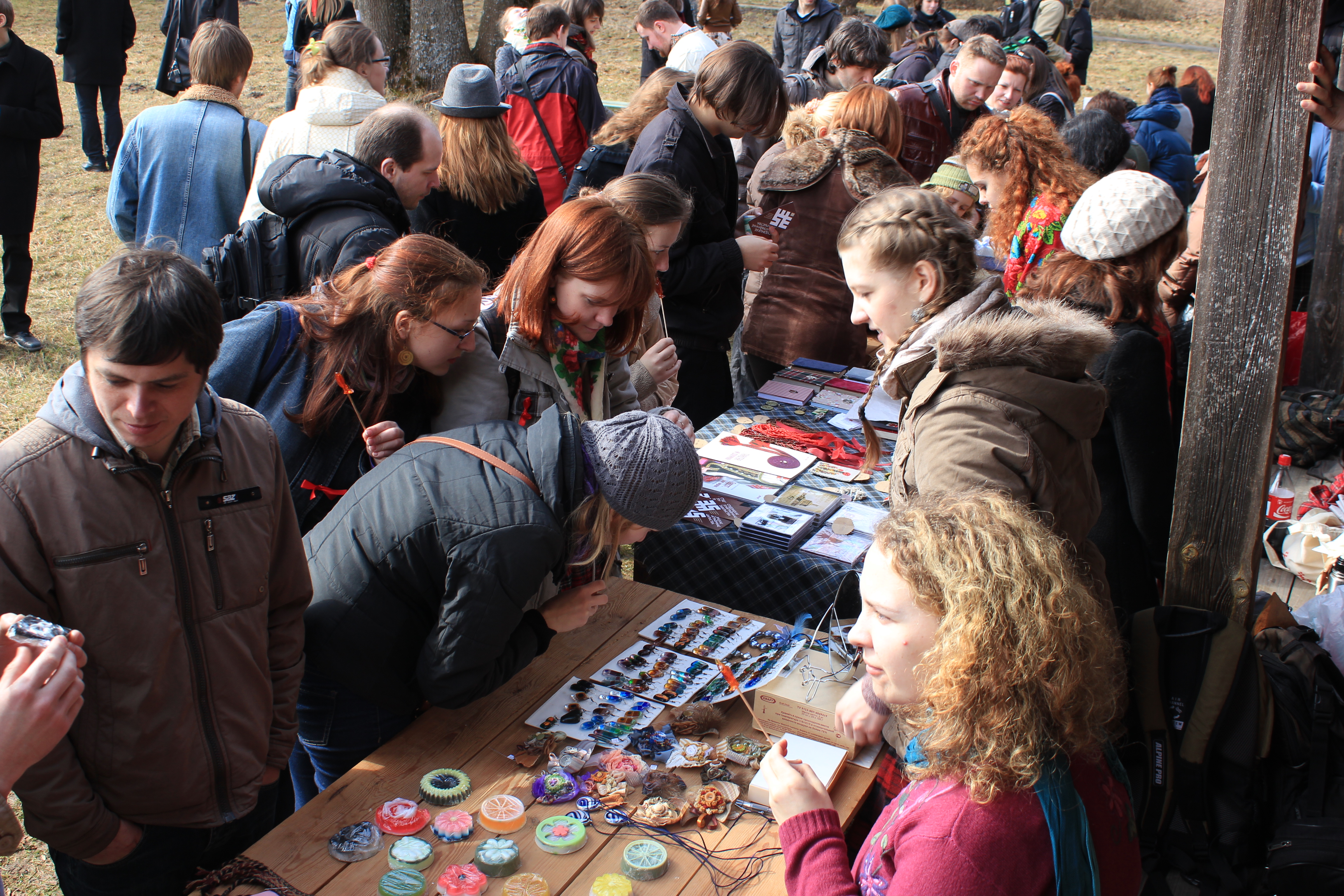
Crafts market, Hukańnie viasny, 2012

== Ethnographic expeditions ==
The Association organized more than twenty ethnographic expeditions to different regions of Belarus. It has created its own scientific archive and ethnographic collections, composed of some 2,000 hours of audio-visual materials and 50,000 photos.

- Lepiel-1998
- Uśviaty-1999
- Sianno-2000
- Krupki-2001
- Siebiež-2002

- Haradok-2003
- Barysaŭ-2004
- Lozna-2005
- Ušačy-2006
- Staryja Darohi-2007

- Suraž-2007
- Latgalija-2007
- Drybin-2008
- Čašniki-2008
- Kalinkavičy-2009

- Sianno-2009
- Śvietłahorsk-2010
- Klimavičy-2010
- Kličaŭ-2011
- Dziatłava-2012

- Dokšycy-2012
- Horki-2013
- Vialejka-2014
- Masty-2014
- Čavusy-2014

=== Horki-2013 ===
An ethnographic expedition to Horki district Mahiloŭ region was organised from 5 to 23 August 2013. During the expedition, a vast collection of audio-visual materials (about 500 songs and its variants) was gathered and local textile and other crafts were analysed. The major part of Horki district was covered by the expedition. In addition, a solid analysis of the border area of Kraśninski district Smalensk region (Russia) was carried out. In Russia the work was conducted in cooperation with the culture department of Kraśninski district.

== Partners ==
Students' Ethnographic Association collaborates with various scientific, research and educational institutions of Belarus, including the Scientific and Educational Centre of the Belarusian State Pedagogical University, Institute of Art, Ethnography and Folklore of the National Academy of Sciences of Belarus, Belarusian Institute of Problems of Culture, Belarusian State Museum of Folk Architecture and Rural Lifestyle, cultural institutions in Belarusian regions, as well as youth organisations and folk groups from Lithuania, Latvia, Poland, Russia, Ukraine, Estonia and Sweden.
