= Dmitry Zelenin (ethnographer) =

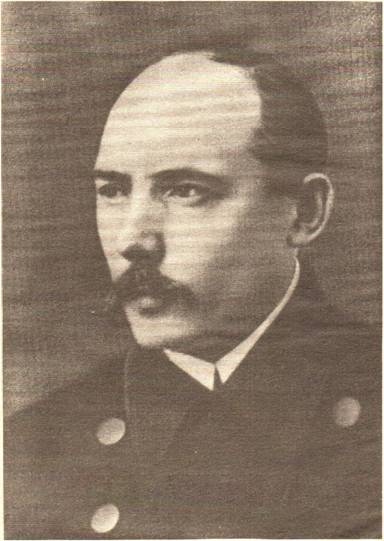
Dmitry Zelenin, ca. 1905

Dmitry Konstantinovich Zelenin (Russian: Дми́трий Константи́нович Зеле́нин; November 2, 1878 – August 31, 1954) was a Russian and Soviet linguist and ethnographer.

He was born in an Udmurt village near Sarapul, where his father was a parish clerk. He attended the Vyatka seminary and the Dorpat University. As of 1915, he read lectures on Slavic dialects at the Petrograd University. He argued that the East Slavs comprise four distinct branches (North Russians, South Russians, Little Russians and White Russians) and outlined some subtle differences between East Slavic dialects.

In the early 20th century, Zelenin collected fairy tales and chastushkas in his native region and the Northern Urals. This collection of folk tales was extensively used by his disciple Vladimir Propp. He was also the first to explore the concept of "unclean dead" in the Slavic folklore.

In 1927, Max Vasmer published Zelenin's magnum opus, Russische (Ostslavische) Volkskunde. It was "the most comprehensive survey of research works and data on East Slavic folk culture" available at the time.

Between 1916 and 1925 Zelenin lived in Kharkiv, teaching at the local university and helping to set up the Museum of the Sloboda Ukraine. In 1925 he joined the staff of the Leningrad University and the Kunstkammer Museum.

In the late 1920s and 1930s Zelenin developed an interest in Turkology. Every summer he would roam the Altai Mountains and Kazakh steppes, collecting materials for his work. In 1936 he managed to publish a pioneering study of Siberian shamanism ("The Cult of Ongons in Siberia").

Zelenin led the European Brigade of the Institute of Anthropology and Ethnography, which was formed in 1938 to formulate the list of nationalities to be officially recognized by the Soviet Union.

Despite his adoption of Marr's theories, Zelenin was attacked by Soviet Marxist ethnologists as a Russian nationalist and racist "in disguise", which made the publication of his new works impossible. His later works are thought to be lost.

In November 2004 the Anthropology Forum of Saint Petersburg honored Zelenin with some readings dedicated to him.

== Publications ==
- Mezhdunarodnyi iazyk nauki i kul'turnykh snoshenii, Moscow, 1901. (The international language of science and cultural relations)
- Russische (Ostslavische) Volkskunde, Berlin und Leipzig, de Gruyter, 1927.
- Imushchestvennyye zaprety kak perezhitki pervobytnogo kommunizma, Leningrad, 1934. (Property Restrictions as Survivals of Primitive Communism)
- Kult ongonov v Sibiri, Moscow, 1936. (The Cult of Ongons in Siberia)
  - French translation: Le culte des idoles en Sibérie, Paris : Payot, 1952.
