= Green week =

Slavic folk Christianity holiday

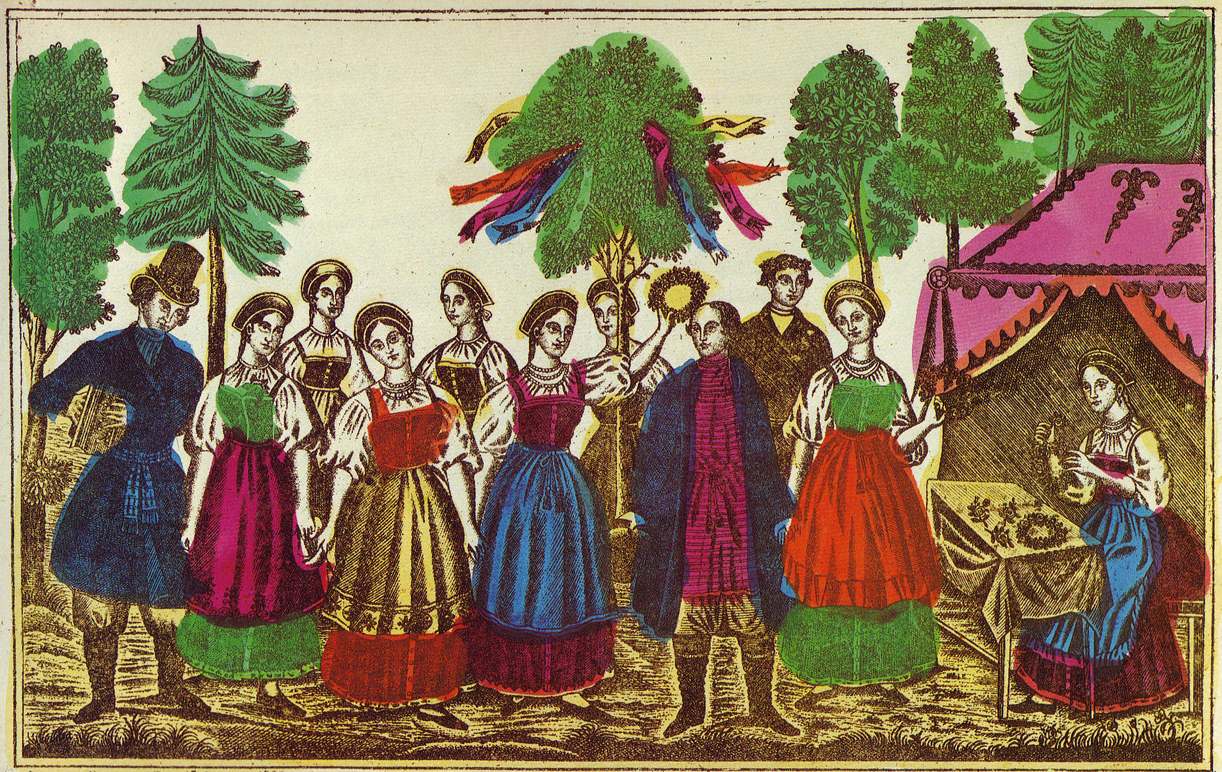
- Semik, Russian lubok, 19th century
- Also called: various names in Slavic languages: Belarusian: зялёныя святкі, зелянец, сёмуха; Bulgarian: русалска седмица; Czech: rusalné svátky, rusalje; Russian: зелёные cвятки, русальная неделя, русалии; Polish: zielone świątki; Ukrainian: зелені свята, русалії
- Observed by: Slavic people
- Begins: Easter + 42 days
- Ends: Pentecost
- Date: the week preceding Pentecost
- Duration: 7
- Frequency: annual
- Related to: Pentecost, Trinity Sunday, Eastern Orthodox liturgical days, Rosalia

Green week, or the green holidays, is a traditional Slavic seasonal festival celebrated in early June. It is closely linked with the veneration of the dead and the spring agricultural rites. In Eastern European villages, the seven weeks following Easter have historically been a time of festivity. Green week takes place during the seventh week leading up to the Pentecost, and includes the seventh Thursday after Easter, called Semik.

The green week is followed by Trinity week, also known as the holiday of the Trinity in Eastern Christianity. It is also widely known as Whitsuntide week in the English-speaking world, especially Great Britain, and is inaugurated by the celebrations of Trinity Sunday, the Sunday of Pentecost in Eastern Christianity.

== Observance ==
=== Russia ===
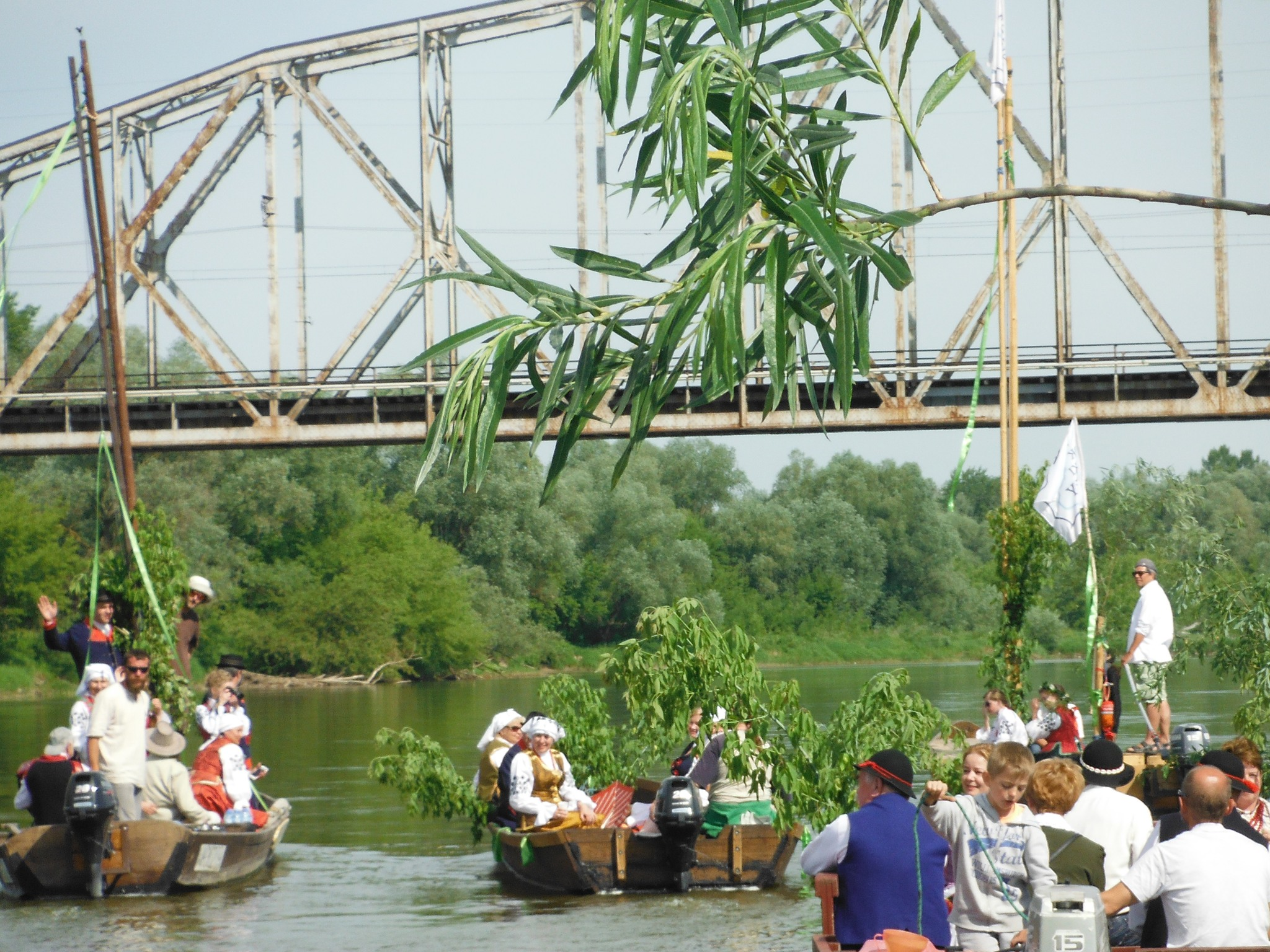
Celebrants carrying green branches on river boats during green week celebrations, Urzecze, Poland, 2017

In Russia on Semik (the Thursday of the green week), funeral rites are held for the unclean dead (those who had died before their time). Birch trees are particularly significant, because they are considered hosts for the souls of the deceased. Sometimes people honor a particular tree by decorating it or carrying it around. At other times, people cut birch branches and hang them in their homes. The birch is also seen as a symbol of vegetative power, and may be honored with people's hope that it will bring its vitality to the coming season's crops.

Springtime and fertility rituals are also important to the holiday. Girls bring offerings of fried eggs (a symbol of rebirth) and beer to birches, and speak charms about improved harvest when weaving garlands for the trees. Another tradition is for girls to pledge vows of friendship before the chosen birch tree. Some believe this to be the remnant of ritual sexual activity associated with the cult of spring. Like Kostroma during Maslenitsa, in Russia a chosen birch tree is destroyed at the end of the festivities. It is usually drowned, "in order to provide the needed rainfall for the sprouting crops".

=== Ukraine ===
In Ukraine during the Green holidays (Ukrainian: Зелені свята) women would engage in the tradition known as kumuvannia (кумування), during which a kerchief and coral jewelry would be given to a potential godmother of one's future child (kumá). In Polesia girls would give each other birch wreaths and yellow-painted eggs, kissing and wishing for themselves to become kumas in the future. During the Green week people would also commemorate the deceased by visiting their graves, holding religious services and feasting. Among Hutsuls, after a blessing ceremony in the church, bread loaves (kalach) would be carried to the cemetery along with cheese and milk products. In Galicia knyshes and pies would be baked for this occasion. Bread made during the Green week was considered to have magical properties. In some regions of Ukraine koliva would also be prepared in that period.

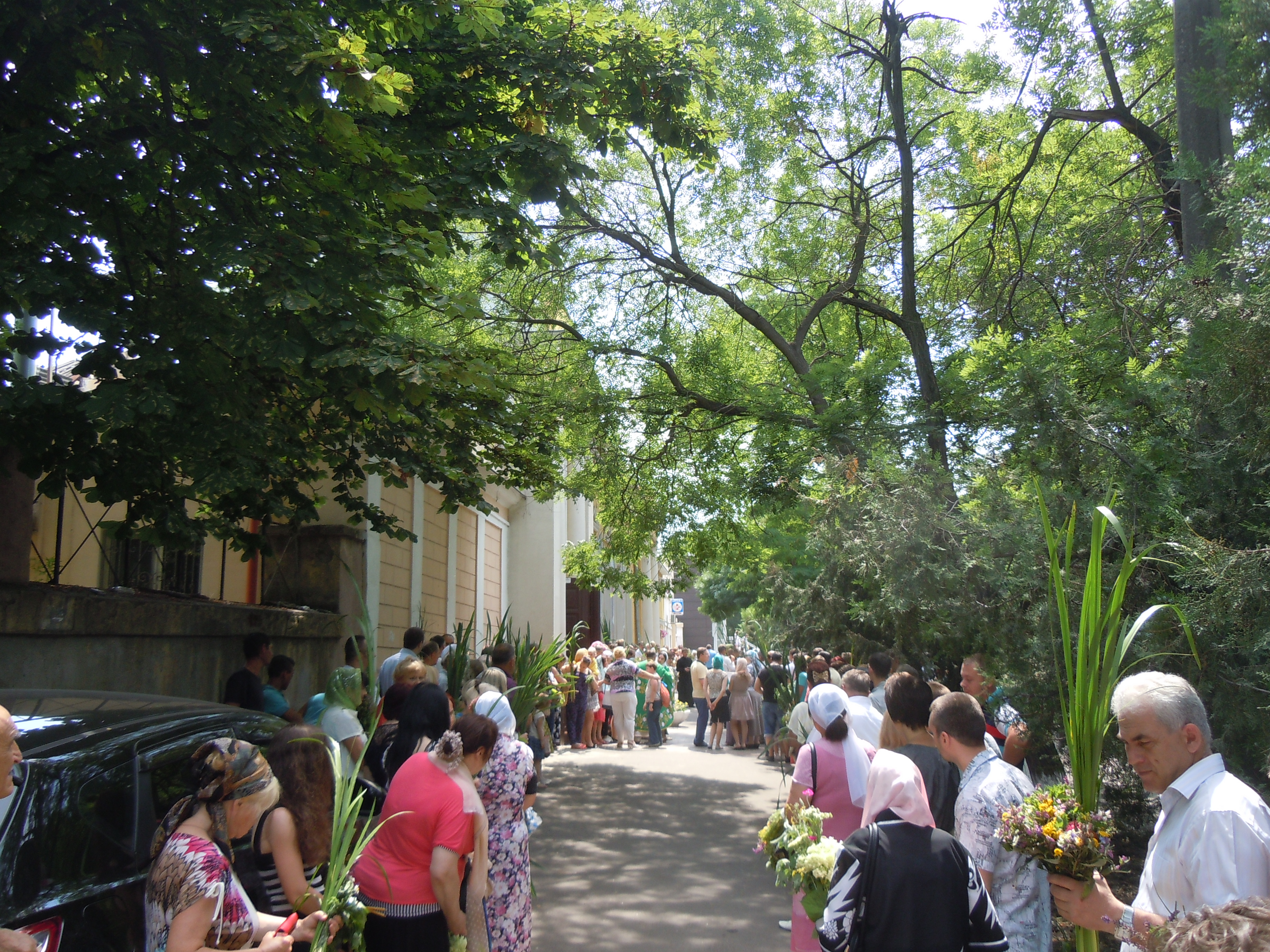
Blessing of green branches during Pentecost in Odesa

As part of the commemoration ritual during the Green week, in Ukraine graves would be decorated with green branches of linden, willow, maple and other plants. Private homes were adorned in a similar way. The most popular plant for this purpose was sweet flag, which was considered to have magical properties, functioning as an amulet against evil forces, and could also be used for covering floors. Other plants used for house decoration during the feast were thymus, lovage, carex, ash, oak, walnut etc. Green branches could also be placed on garden plots to provide good harvest, and in Podolia they would be thrown into wells to attract rainfall. In some Ukrainian villages the tradition of blessing wells on Green holidays exists to this day.

After the Pentecost service, Ukrainian peasants would go into the fields together with a parish priest, who performed a blessing ritual over each plot of land in order to protect the harvest from hail and fire. In some localities a cross would be dug into the earth to prevent hailstorms. If the procession passed a roadside cross, the priest would say a prayer commemoration the person who had paid for its erection. Sometimes a few stalks of rye or wheat would be tied together, as it was believed to stimulate growth. In some places the procession would produce noise to expel evil forces from the fields.

== Association with rusalki ==
The rusalki are nature spirits (navki, mavki) associated with green week traditions. They derived their name from Rusalii, another name for the holidays. Some believe they were associated with deceased family members, or perhaps only unclean dead. Sometimes an honored birch tree would be named for a rusalka as part of green week. Some of the rites of green week (like making offerings of eggs and garlands) were thought to placate the rusalki so they would stay away from the village's agricultural fields for the season and not bring them harm. In Ukraine it was believed that bread baked on Saturday during the Green week was the best for accommodating rusalki and mavki. Rusalki are also associated with water and fertility, and so may be invoked during green week in an attempt to bring their moisture and vigor to the fields. During green week, rusalki are believed to be more active, making them a greater threat to villagers. One precaution villagers take during this week is to avoid swimming, because rusalki are thought to live in the water and could drown passersby.

== Related observances ==
There is a similar holiday celebrating Pentecost in Romania, called Rusalii. There are also similar Germanic traditions, for example, Pfingstbaumpflanzen in Germany. In modern-day Poland it is celebrated along with Pentecost Sunday as Zielone Świątki.

== See also ==
- Călușari
