= Apocryphal prayer =

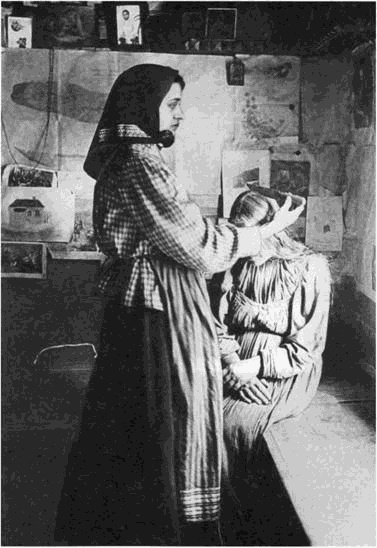
Treatment of a seizure patient with a knife and prayer by a witch doctor, Ryazan Governorate, 1914

Apocryphal prayer (in the Index of Repudiated Books, false prayer) is a prayer modeled on the church prayer, but containing a large number of insertions from folk beliefs, incantations, in some cases rearrangements or excerpts from apocrypha. Performed as apotropeia (amulet ritual), it is also used for medicinal purposes. Apocryphal prayers are mostly texts of bookish origin. It is found in all collections of zagovory.

== History ==
Apocryphal prayers and hagiographies adapted for "protective" purposes are much more common in the folk tradition than canonical church texts. The use of written texts as amulets began late and their range was relatively narrow, but this did not prevent some of them from becoming widespread.

Apocryphal prayers exist in both oral and written forms. As bookish texts, they retain the features of written language, which leads to the distortion of difficult-to-understand passages. The apocryphal prayers preserved in ancient manuscripts are more ecclesiastical in character than those recorded from the vernacular. Oral "versions" of apocryphal prayers are free translations into spoken language. Some versions may retain the genre form of a prayer, while others take on the features of zagovory.

Some apocryphal prayers are excerpts from popular apocrypha, sometimes distorted or abridged. One source of apocryphal prayers in the Orthodox tradition is Abagar, the first printed book in Bulgarian, authored by Bishop Philip Stanislav. It is a collection of apocrypha, including the New Testament Apocrypha of King Avagar. Among the Southern Slavs, this apocryphal played the role of a protective talisman. Also included in "Abagar" at different times were two apocryphal tales: "And these are the names of the Lord by the number ÕB. These two tales were included at different times: "And these are the names of the Lord's name, numbered ÕB" and "The names of the blessed Virgin Mary numbered ÕB". Lists of these apocrypha texts were also circulated among Eastern Slavic readers. The basis of these texts was a listing of the sacred names of God and the Virgin Mary.

Among texts of bookish origin, both Orthodox and Catholics have a significant proportion of apocryphal prayers that contain accounts of the life and crucifixion of Christ or other significant events of sacred history.

== Applications ==
Apocryphal prayers are used for protective and healing purposes. They were often copied and used as talismans and amulets, which were worn together with a body cross or kept in the house. With the eastern Slavs, the rewriting of such texts by ordinary people did not reduce their sacredness and "effectiveness", while with the southern Slavs great importance was attached to the fact that these "salvation" texts, called "hamajlia", were rewritten by people with a sacred status - Orthodox priests or Muslim clerics.

The use of apocryphal prayers is often determined solely by tradition, so their endings usually contain an explanation of what trouble the prayer protects against. For example: "Whoever knows this prayer, who by memory, who by literacy, will be saved from the enemy, saved from the beast. On the court easy judgment, on the water easy swimming" (Vologda region); "Kto będzie tę modlitewkę odmawiał... Nie zginie wśród burzy i pieronów..." ("Whoever reads these prayers will not be lost amidst storms and lightning" (southeastern Poland). Presumably, these endings go back to the conclusions of Byzantine hagiographies, which received an independent development in Slavic folk traditions.

== Examples ==
The most common prayers and incantations are those for fever. The text usually mentions Saint Sisynius and Herod's daughters - fever. In Malorussian apocryphal prayers the role of Sisynius is often played by Abrahamius or Isaacius.

Exceptionally common is the apocryphal prayer "Our Lady's Dream," which contains the account of Our Lady's torture of Christ on the cross. The text is known in both Catholic and Orthodox traditions in numerous variations, but there is great variation in the purposes for which such texts are used in different cultures. In the popular environment of the Eastern Slavs, this prayer occupies a dominant place and is revered on a par with Our Father and Psalm 90. It was most often recited before going to bed as a general apotropaic text. The text of the "Dream of the Virgin Mary" was worn as a talisman in an amulet together with a body cross.

Apocrypha, listing the sacred names of God and the Virgin Mary, were used as apotrophets, as these names were considered intolerable to the forces of evil. Thus, according to a number of Serbian Bailichka, protection from weshtitsa (female demonological beings) are prayers uttered in time: "I have Jesus!", "Help, God, and Majko Boja!" and others, from vampires - "God help!" and others. The first letters of the name of the Virgin and Jesus Christ, carved above doors, windows, on hiding places with grain, are also considered as amulets against the penetration of evil spirits into the house.

Apocryphal prayers that include an account of the life and crucifixion of Christ are illustrated by the following text from southeastern Poland, uttered for safety during a thunderstorm: "W Jordanie się począł, / W Betlejem narodził, / W Nazaret umarł. / A Słowo stało ciałem / I mieszkało między nami" ("In Jordan began, in Bethlehem was born, in Nazareth died. And Word became body and lived among us"). The account of Christ's anguish for the salvation of mankind projects the idea of universal salvation into a particular situation, so it is thought that in some cases a reference to events from the life of Christ is sufficient for salvation from danger. In Polesia it was believed that when encountering a wolf, it is sufficient to ask him the question: "Wawk, wawk where have you been / as Cyca Khrysta rośpinály?" (or "were you taken?"). Одна из молитв при собирании трав представляет собой искажение и сокращение апокрифа о том, как Христос пахал; одна из молитв от сглаза — переделку апокрифа о рождестве Спасителя.

The popular apocryphal text The Tale of the Twelve Fridays combines two functions. It explains on which Fridays one must fast in order to avoid certain dangers. For example: "1st Friday ... Whoever fasts this Friday will be spared from sinking in the rivers ... 3rd Friday ... Whoever fasts this Friday will be spared from enemies and robbers ..." At the same time, this text is used as a talisman to deliver from various troubles.

The apocryphal prayers also include texts in the form of questions and answers about the structure of the Christian world, built along the lines of Dove Book and having bookish origins. An account of the cosmic nature of the world and an enumeration of the values that ensure its equilibrium and cultural state was perceived as a reliable defense against the forces of chaos. An example of a text known predominantly from the Western Belarusian uniates: "Tell me, what are the twelve? - Twelve Holy Apostles" (hereafter only answers) - "Ozinatsatsi koskal'nykh", - "the ten Commandments of Bosnia, given to us on the mountains of Symon", - "Dziewiec khorów angels", - "Gosem sven prophetü", etc. In the West Belarusian tradition it is believed that the questions are asked by chet, and the answers from these texts save the innocent soul from the unclean force. These verses are called "On the saving of the Chrysian soul, or the conversation of the devil with the little claps". A. N. Veselovsky considered such texts as "catechism of church-school origin, which meets the primary mnemonic requirements of spiritual learning" and found variants of this "tale of numbers" in almost all European traditions. However, the use of such texts as apotropaies in these traditions is unknown.

== Apocryphal and folk prayers ==
Folk Orthodoxy is a broader concept than apocryphal prayers. This category includes canonical prayers in popular culture, fragments of church service endowed with apotropaic function (that is, having non-canonical application), and non-canonical prayers proper. The functioning and anchoring of folk prayers in tradition as apotropies is largely determined not by their own semantics, but by their high sacred status. These texts themselves do not possess apotropaic semantics, and their use as amulets is determined by their ability, as believed, to prevent potential danger. The main part of the corpus of such texts is of book origin and penetrated into the folk tradition with acceptance of Christianity, a smaller part are authentic texts.

In contrast to the Trebniks (containing, in particular, canonical prayers), where each prayer has a strictly defined use, in popular culture canonical Christian prayers usually have no such fixation, and are used as universal apothecaries for all occasions. The main reason for this is that the circle of canonical prayers known in traditional culture is extremely narrow. These include such common prayers with apotropheic semantics as "Let God arise, and His enemies be made waste..." (in the East Slavic folk tradition it is usually called "Sunday Prayer") and the 90th psalm "Alive in aid..." (usually reworked by popular etymology into "Living Help"), as well as "Our Father" and "Virgin Mary, Rejoice..." (in Catholic tradition - "Zdrowiaś, Maria..."). The Lord's Prayer is the universal apotheosis of the Lord's Prayer, which is explained by its unique status: it is the only "nonvirtuous" prayer, that is, given to people by God himself, Christ. At the same time, this prayer is a declaration of man's belonging to the Christian world and of his being under the protection of heavenly powers.

Fragments of a church service, which are in no way connected in meaning with the apotropaic situation in which they are used, also function as amulets. For example, the beginning from the Liturgy of St. Basil the Great, "In you rejoice, O Grace, all things, the angelic assembly and the human race..." may be recited by the master during the driving of the cow to pasture.

== See also ==
- Folk Orthodoxy
- Superstition
- Traditional Slavic Medicine

== Bibliography ==
- Борисовский А. Приметы, обычаи и пословицы в пяти волостях Нижегородского уезда // Нижегородский сборник. — Нижний Новгород, 1870. — Т. 3.
- Ефименко П. С. Сборник малороссийских заклинаний // Чтения в Обществе истории и древностей Российских при имп. Московском университете. — М., 1874. — Кн. 1 (88).
- Алмазов А. И. Врачевальные молитвы // Летопись Историко-филологического общества при имп. Новороссийском университете. — Одесса, 1900. — Т. 8.
- Алмазов А. И. К истории византийской отреченной письменности: (Апокрифические молитвы, заклинания и заговоры). — Одесса, 1901.
- Виноградов Н. Заговоры, обереги, спасательные молитвы и пр. // Живая старина. — СПб., 1909. — Вып. 2.
- Slovanská ludska molitva. Ljubljana, 1983.
- Учебные задания по курсу «Устное народное творчество». Традиционная крестьянская магия. СПб., 1992.
- Адоньева С, Овчинникова О. Традиционная русская магия в записях конца XX в. — СПб., 1993.
- Czyżewski F. Sposoby zażegnywania burzy // Twórczość ludowa. Lublin, 1993. Maj.
