= Unclean force =

Slavic reference to mythological evil creatures

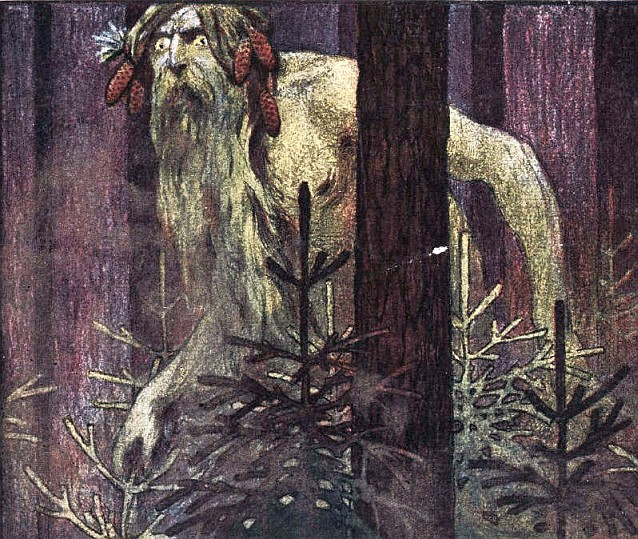
Leshy, artist N.N. Brutus, 1906.

Unclean force (Russian: не́чисть, нечистики; не́жить, 'undead') is a collective name in Slavic paganism for mythological forces and creatures including evil spirits, chorts, demons, werewolves and the undead — Domovoy, Polevik, Vodyanoy, Leshy, rusalka, kikimora and other. Common to all of them is belonging to the "unclean", "negative", "out of this world", the otherworldly world and their malevolence towards people. Shepherds, millers, blacksmiths, witches and sorcerers were suspected of having ties with evil forces.

== Origin ==
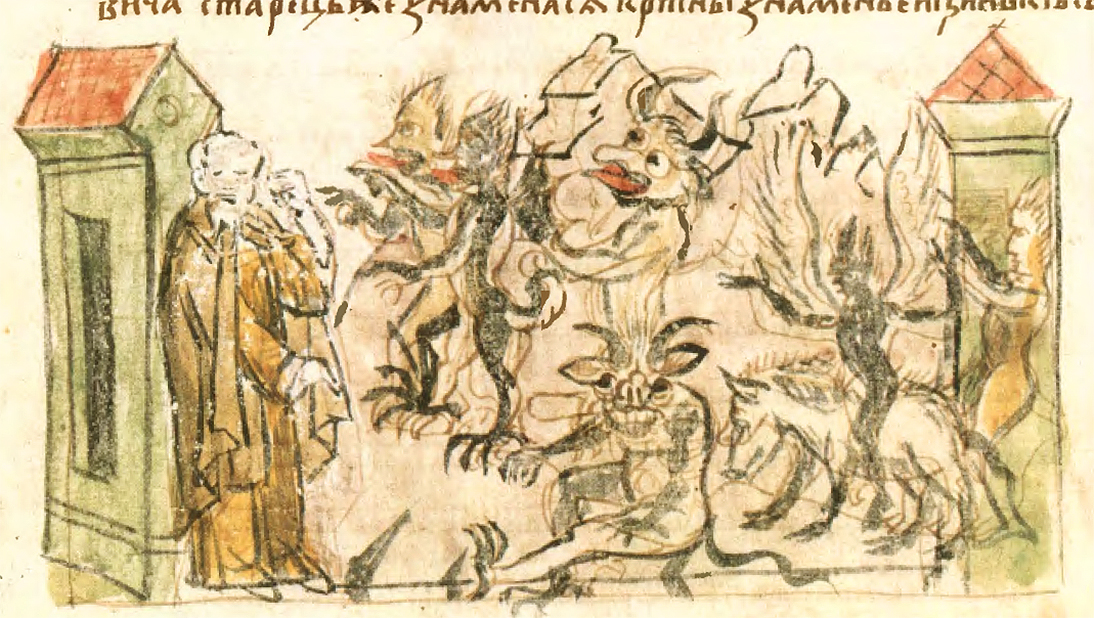
Vision of a crowd of demons to the elder Matthew the Prosorious, Kiev Pechersk Monastery, 1074. Miniature from the Radziwiłł Chronicle, late 15th century

In Christianity, unclean forces are seen as fallen angels. According to apocryphal Christian beliefs, the unclean force is partly created by God, partly by Satan. Others of its varieties appear from the so-called "mortgaged dead" - unbaptized children, suicides or those who died another unnatural death (e.g., drowned). People kidnapped by unclean forces (by Leshy, Vodyanoy, rusalki) and children cursed by their parents could turn into evil. Children who had been conceived with an unclean force could also become unclean.

In Croatia, a nečista sila is a phrase used to describe the term hudoba meaning something angry or evil, or the devil, and the legend was that God created all animals but the wolf which was born by hudoba.

The "masters" of certain loci - Domovoys, Vodyanoys, Leshies, Poleviks (field Domovoy), swamp spirits - are mixed with the image of chort, with "walking" dead people (spirits of the dead).

Folklorist Lyudmila Vinogradova believes that under different names the contours of one character emerge, and the names change depending on the place of meeting with him. Such a generalizing figure, overlapping almost the entire variety of male demonic images, is the cohort in Polesia, as the main embodiment of all unclean forces.

In Russian mythology, the origin of unclean forces (Domovoys, Leshies, and the like), dating back to the apocryphal legend of the children of Adam and Eve, born after the fall into sin and hidden from God. "To show them all to the light of God Adam was ashamed, and therefore he hid them in a hut, a bathhouse, in a rig, in the forest and in the water, and God for this secrecy made it so that the children of the forefather forever and remained in places of concealment, where they live, multiplying like humans".

In Obonezhskaya Pyatina:

"Why did the woods wither, wady, scorching, and damp? It is from Adam's uncles, that he agreed to show God that his wife had grown a whole arava".

— Власова М. «Новая Абевега русских суеверий» — Saint Petersburg: Северо-Запад, 1995

In the Smolensk province it was told that Eve advised Adam to hide some of his children in the reeds before going to God: "As Adam was walking away from God, he thought, 'Let me go in and take my uncles by the reeds! But they are no longer there, and their ranks are not lost, but they have become a dark force: masters of ladies, masters of forests, masters of water holes — the idea that God created them to live".

In the title "Adam's Children" the folk reinterpretation of the biblical narrative was united with the peasants' ideas about a host of unclean people (Domovoys, Leshies, Banniks) as special, "hidden people", ancestors, the dead. They are connected by various (kinship, contractual and similar) relations with those supernatural forces and beings, which, according to pre-Christian beliefs, fill the whole world — earth, waters, forests.

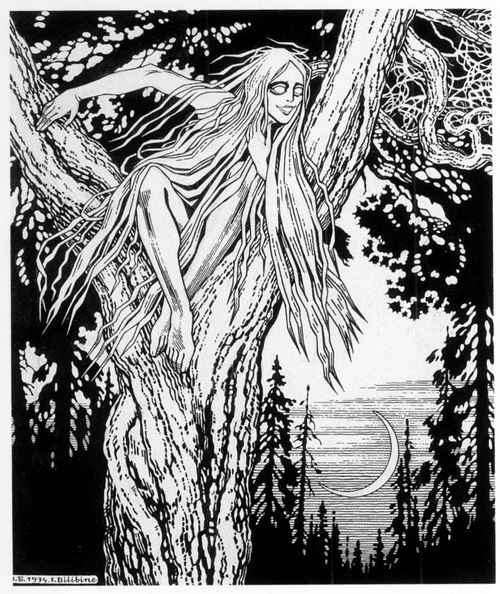
Rusalka, artist Ivan Bilibin, 1934

== The undead ==
One of the euphemisms for unclean force is "undead". The concept was described in the Explanatory Dictionary of Vladimir Dal and included humanoid spirits such as: Domovoy, Polevik, Vodyanoy, Leshy, rusalka, kikimora and others, but did not include the rising dead, ghosts, chorts. Vladimir Dal wrote in his explanatory dictionary: "According to the expression of peasants, the undead do not live and do not die. The undead do not have their own appearance, it walks in disguise. All undead are speechless". In Slavic demonology, they are counted among the demons. Other sources slightly different interpretation of the concept, attributing to it, for example, chorts.

== Manifestations ==
In Volhynia, it was believed that on Thursday night, one should not beat a child and put it outside the door. Otherwise, the unclean spirit will take it away, and in its place will plant another one, who will eat a lot, but only the head will grow, and the legs and arms will be so thin that he will not be able to walk.

In Polesia, if an infant cried incessantly at night, the reason for this was seen in the fact that the child was attacked by notsnitsa, "crixa molested", "notsnitsa walk in the house". In zagovory, the child was asked to leave the child in peace to the notsnitsa-sisters of the night, crixa-plaxa, forest women.

== Spirits of Christmas Eve's ==
Svyatochnaya uncleanness or Svyatochniye spirits (Russian: Святочная нечисть, Святочные духи) appear in the "turning point" period of the winter solstice. It was believed that they began to walk on the second day of Christmas (Koliada), and on the day of Epiphany after vespers disappeared. According to Northern Russian beliefs, the rampage of the demonic army falls on the second week of Holy Week.

The Slavs considered Svyatki a dangerous period, which belongs to otherworldly forces. According to the beliefs, God, rejoicing at the birth of the Son, releases the souls of the dead and all chorts from the "other world". To the category of "svyatochniye" spirits in the Russian North included shulikuns, kulyashi, svyatke. They began to walk on the second day of Christmas, and on the day of Epiphany after vespers disappeared. On New Year's Eve, as it was believed, the dead awakened; taking the form of animals, they walked on the ground (Vladimir region). According to testimonies from the Russian North, the unclean time lasts from Nikola Zimniy until Epiphany: at this time "Satan commands his servants to walk the earth and predict people's fate".

== See also ==
- Slavic mythology
- Superstition in Russia
