= Himmelsbrief =

Religious document

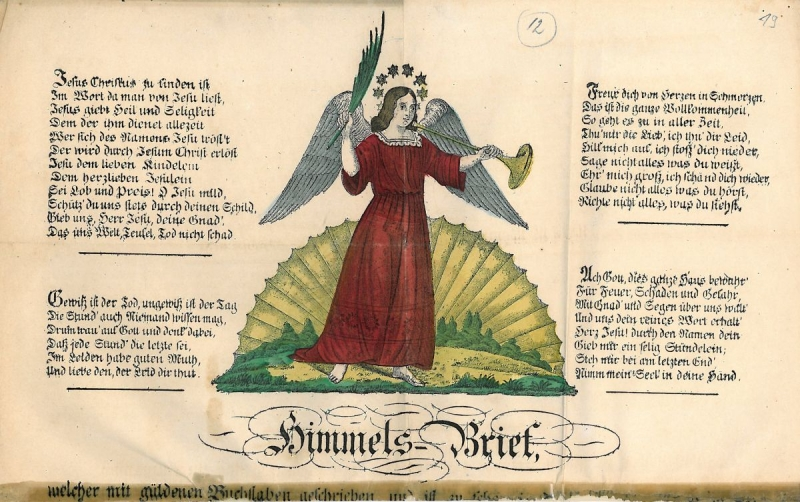
A Himmelsbrief from c. 1800

A Himmelsbrief, also known as a "heaven's letter" or "heavenly letter", is a religious document said to have been written by God or a divine agent. Their purpose is to protect the bearer or place from all evil and danger; however, there is a price for their protection.

They are often said to have miraculously "fallen from sky", claim protection for owners of a copy (encouraging memetic replication) and punishment for disbelievers.

Some authors reserve the name for Christian apocryphal documents, but similar pieces are found in Islam, Hinduism and pre-Christian religions.

Hippolytus of Rome mentions one in Refutation of All Heresies (third century), and the earlier full text is a Latin one dated in the 6th century.

While preaching, Jacob, the organizer of the Shepherds' Crusade (1251), held one which was allegedly given by the Virgin Mary.

== Pennsylvania German ==
English-language Himmelsbrief from the Pennsylvania German community, 19th century

In the Pennsylvania German community, they are part of Pow-wow tradition and contained Bible verses and other charms and assurances that their owners would be protected from death, injury, and other misfortune. The text of these letters is often written according to a long established formula. This is why it is sometimes believed that Himmelsbrief are the original chain letters. Pow-wow practitioners charged handsome sums for these magical letters; the price they commanded depended on the reputation of the practitioner. However, some traditions call for it to be given free of charge. A hand-written letter produced by a respected Hexenmeister or Braucher is regarded as a powerful talisman. Himmelsbrief may be written in order to communicate with someone departed, or to request assistance from God in heaven.

== See also ==
- The Roman ancile, Mars' shield said to have fallen from the sky.
- The folk Orthodox cult of Saint Nedelya is based on an alleged scroll found in a rock from the sky
