= Saint Nedelya =

Slavic personification of Sunday

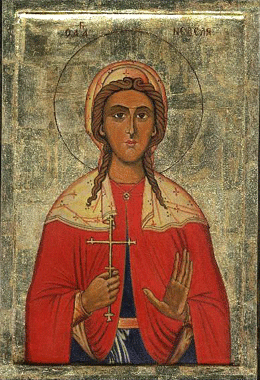
- Icon of Holy Sunday

Creature information
- Folklore: Slavic Mythology

Origin
- Details: The embodiment of the day of the week - Sunday

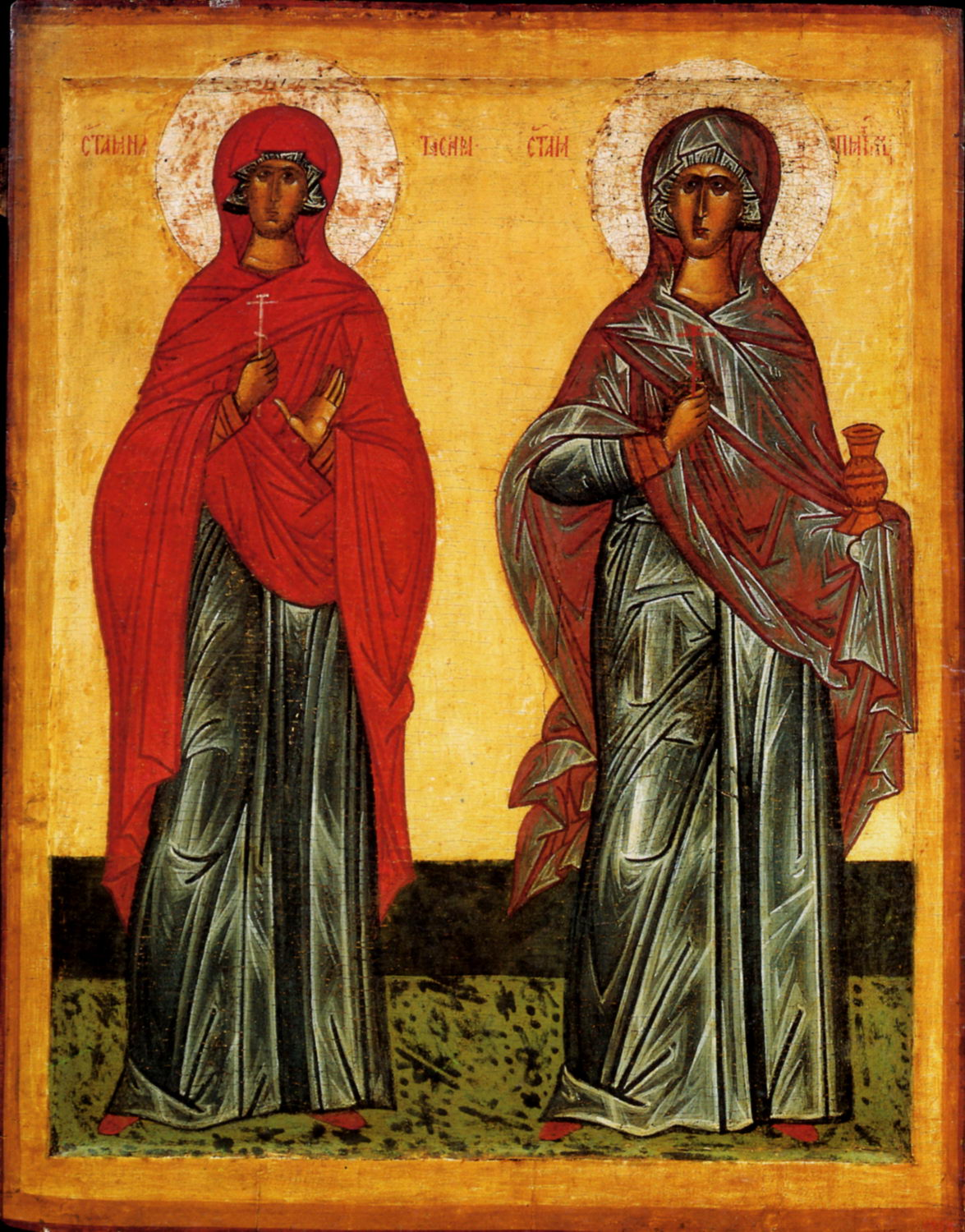
Icon "Saints Anastasia and Paraskeva Friday", Russia, XV century.

Saint Nedelya (St. Sunday, St. Anastasia, in folk Orthodoxy of the Slavs is the personification of Sunday as day of the week. It is correlated with Saint Anastasia (in Bulgarians also with Saint Kyriakia. The veneration of the Week is associated with the prohibition of various kinds of work (cf. the origin of the Slavic Sunday from not to do).

== In Old Russian sources ==
The Old Russian sermons against paganism ("Word about creatures and days of the week" and "Word of St. Gregory... How the first Gentiles worshipped idols"), it is said that one should not venerate the image of the Week as a "goon", not the day of the week as such, but "Christ's resurrection".

The formation of the popular cult of the Holy Week was also influenced by the translated apocrypha "Epistle of Jesus on the Week." According to the Apocrypha, a stone falls from heaven in Rome or Jerusalem in which a "scroll" is found. In the name of Christ, it prescribes righteous living and observance of Sunday (week), as many significant events have taken place on this day: the Annunciation, Baptism and Resurrection of Christ, on which the Last Judgment will also take place. In conclusion, it is said that he who does not believe the "scriptures" will be cursed and condemned to torment. Moreover, the Polish and Southwestern Russian apocrypha copies, based on the Western European editions, mention only the veneration of Week, while the Great Russian apocrypha copies, based on a Byzantine protograph, along with Week, also mention Wednesday and Friday as venerable days "by which the earth stands". The apocryphal plot is reflected in Ukrainian and Belarusian folklore and in Russian spiritual verses. Besides apocryphal writings, the popular veneration of the Week was influenced by the cult of St. Anastasia (Greek: άναστασία "Sunday").

== Folk performance ==
Among the holy wives Paraskeva and Anastasia were especially revered in Russia. Their paired images are the most common in the iconography of Novgorod. The cults of the martyrs had much in common. Both saints were commonly associated in Russian tradition with the Mother of God, the events of the Gospel (Anastasia - with the "Birth of Christ", Paraskeva - with the "Crucifixion"), both patronizing the days of the week: Anastasia - with the Resurrection, Paraskeva - with Friday. According to popular beliefs, they were considered the patrons of women's work and worshipped as healers. Sometimes they were endowed with the same iconographic features. Paraskeva was usually represented wearing a red maforion, but occasionally Anastasia was also depicted in red. In the veneration of Anastasia her role as a healer is emphasized stronger. That is why she is more often depicted holding a vessel of medicine than Paraskeva. She was prayed to by women waiting for the birth of a child.

The Belarusians Grodno Province said that the day of rest (Belarusian: nyadzel) was "given to the people after one day a man hid the holy Week from the dogs that pursued her; before that there were only weekdays. Ukrainians Volhynian Province said that "God gave the Week a whole day, but told her herself to see to it that people did not work on that day." According to Croatian beliefs, Holy Week was without hands, so it was sinful to work on this day.

The Holy Week was believed to come to those who did not observe the prohibition against working on Sunday. The Week appears as a woman in white, gold or silver clothing, with a wounded body and complains that she is being poked with spindles, spun her hair, chopped, cut, etc. In the West Belarusian legend, the Week is paired with an ornate and beautiful Jewish nedzelka (i.e. Saturday, Sabbath, a non-working day for Jews) and complains that the Jews honor their "week" and "you all work on Sunday, and my clean body is ripped off".

The week asks people not to forget the veneration of the holiday or severely punishes violators of the prohibitions with a long or fatal illness, beats them to death with a flax-crushing roller, tears the skin off the hands and body of weavers who do not finish their work in time, and hangs it on the loom (similar plots are associated in Ukrainians with Paraskeva Friday), strangles, puts human life in danger (e.g., turning over a cart), threatens death, scares (the woman, who excuses herself that she spins on Sunday because she is hungry, tosses horse heads and dead bodies into the house: "Eat if you're hungry").

The veneration of the Week is closely related to the veneration of the other personalized days of the week - Wednesday and Friday, which in popular beliefs are related by kinship ties. Serbs believe that Paraskeva Friday is the mother or sister of St. Week (see the consecutive days of St. Paraskeva Friday - October 28 and Saint Anastasia - October 29)

== See also ==
- Anastasia of Sirmium
- Mokosh
- Sveta Nedelja

== Literature ==
- The Slavic Antiquities: An Ethnolinguistic Dictionary : in 5 vols. / The Slavic Antiquities: An Ethnolinguistic Dictionary : 5 vol. - Moscow : International Relations, 2004. - Vol. 3: K (Circle) - P (Quail). - С. 391-392. - ISBN 5-7133-1207-0.
- Воскресенье, в этнографии // Энциклопедический словарь Брокгауза и Ефрона : в 86 т. (82 т. и 4 доп.). — Санкт-Петербург, 1890—1907.
- Gal'kovsky N. M. The struggle of Christianity with the remnants of paganism in ancient Russia. - Kharkov: Eparchial Typography, 1916. - VOL. I. - 376 с.
- Galkovsky N. M. The Struggle of Christianity with the Remains of Paganism in Ancient Rus. - M.: A.I. Snegireva Printing House, 1913. - Vol. II. - 308 pp.
- Federowski M. Lud Białoruski na Rusi Lietewskij. Materiały do etnografii słowiańskiej zgromadzone w latach 1877-1905. T. 1-8. - Kraków, 1897. - Т. 1. Wiara, wierzenia i przesądy z okolic Wołkowyska, Słonima, Lidy i Sokółki. (in Polish)
