= Index of Repudiated Books =

Russian Orthodox index of prohibited religious books

- Council of Laodicea canon 59 (from the 14th century); Rule of the Council of Chalcedon on uncorrected books (since the second half of the 15th century); From the apostolic commandments, the rules of the holy fathers 318, those in Nicaea (from the 15th century), etc.
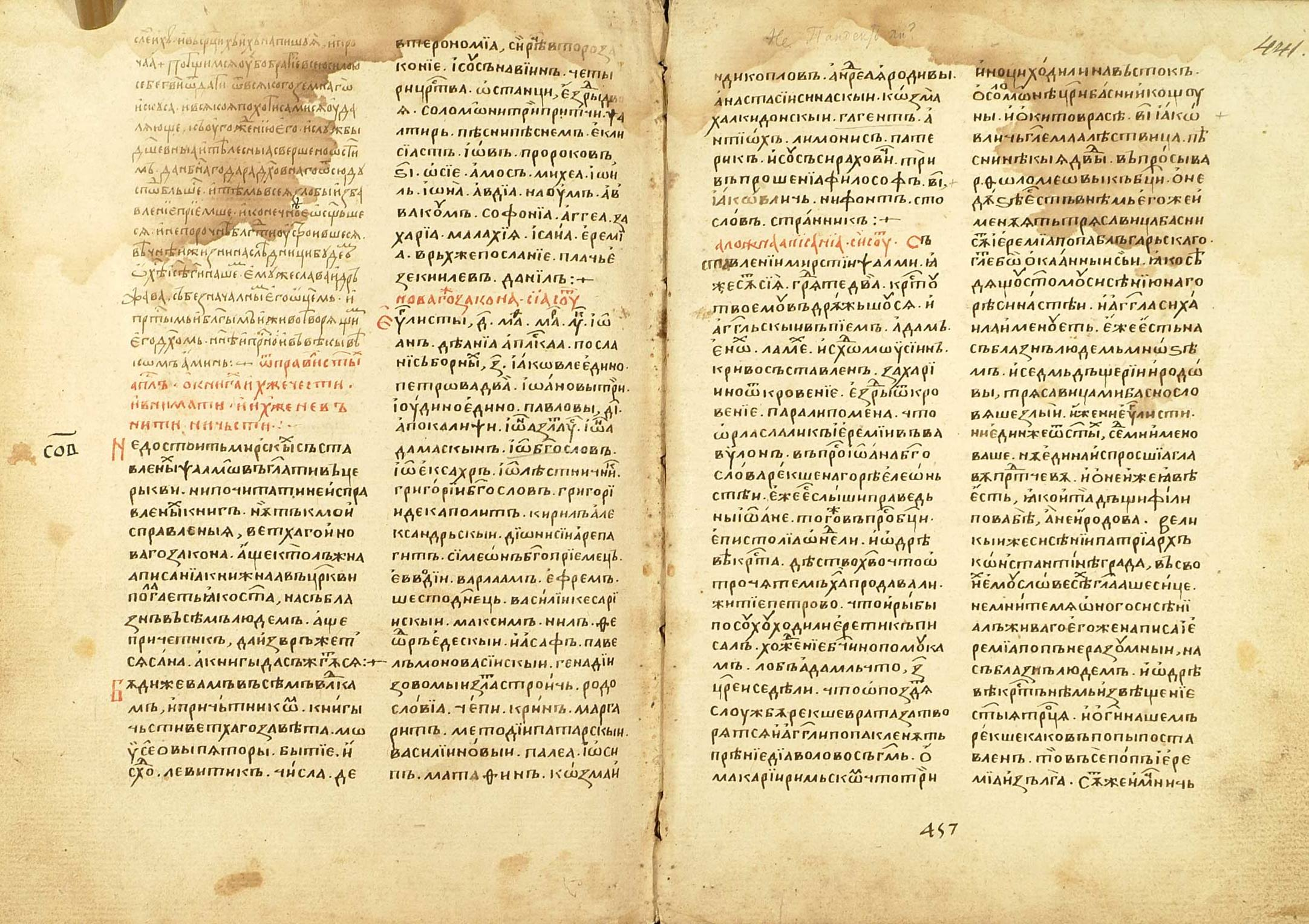
- List (manuscript) of the 15th century
- Author(s): Possibly Athanasius of Alexandria, Isidore (possibly Isidore of Pelusium), Anastasius Sinaita
- Language: Old Church Slavonic
- Date: From the 11th century
- Manuscript(s): 14th–18th centuries
- Subject: List of works forbidden to be read by the Christian Church – Apocrypha

In the Church Slavonic written tradition, the Index of Repudiated Books is a list of writings forbidden to be read by the Orthodox faithful. The works included in this list are renounced (rejected, stripped of authority and declared obsolete). They include apocrypha opposed to Biblical canon. The Slavonic lists originate in translations of the Byzantine lists. In Rus' they have been known since the eleventh century. The Izbornik of Sviatoslav II of Kiev of 1073 contains an index of renounced books and is the earliest bibliographic monument from Rus'. The Index of Repudiated Books may be considered the Orthodox counterpart to the Catholic Index of Prohibited Books.

== Textology and history ==
The process of the development of the lists of the repudiated books is closely connected with the history of Christian literacy in general and with the canonization of religious texts. In different periods of history and in different milieus the term "apocrypha" has had different meanings and different works have been considered apocryphal.

The oldest Slavonic index of the renounced books, translated, is included in the Izbornik of Svyatoslav in 1073. Its copies (manuscripts) of the 15th–18th centuries, in which it is included in the article "Theologian from the words", or lists (manuscripts) dating back to the defective protograph, in which the list without a special title and beginning is attached to the previous article "The same John about the renounced books.

The article "Theologian from Words" is considered the first Russian bibliographical monument. The authorship of the article is attributed to Gregory the Theologian, but probably belongs to Anastasius Sinaitus. The article is included in most Russian copies (manuscripts) of the Izbornik of the fifteenth and eighteenth centuries. The "hidden" books are indicated at the end of the article. The list of books contains a reference to the prohibition of eretic books by Athanasius of Alexandria and to the author of the list of false books by Isidore (possibly Isidore of Pelusiot). Anastasius Sinaiticus, among whose writings the list is sometimes placed, is also assumed to be the author of this list.

A second, also translated list is contained in the Tacticon Nikon of the Black Mountain of the eleventh century, in which it is included in the second part of word XIII. It is based on the same list of Athanasius Isidor as in the Izbornik of 1073, supplemented by sources not named by the author. The apocryphal Revelation of John (Apocalypse of John) and works attributed to the apostles Andrew and Foma are first included. These two names are included based on indications in John Damascene's work On Heresies, as evidenced by the reference in the Tacticon. The index of this type has survived in a number of Russian, Serbian and bulgarian copies (manuscripts), beginning in the first half of the 14th century.

The Slavonic index in Russian manuscripts is known in Nomocanons. The first list of Slavonic origin is considered to be the index included in pergamen the collection of the charter character – "Pogodinsky Nomocanon" of the 14th century. This list for the first time includes in the titles of the works of a Slavic author, the compilation "Tale of the Cross Tree" by the Bulgarian priest Jeremiah, whose circle of works is established on the basis of the indications of this index and in part on the basis of Athanasius' "Epistle to Pank on the Cross Tree", the earliest copy (manuscript) of which is included in the Novgorod Kormchaia of 1280.

The Slavonic index is included in collections of permanent composition – the Church Statutes, Tribes, the Kormchaya, in relatively permanent composition – the "Golden Chain", "Izmaragd" and others, and in a large number of collections of non-permanent composition, such as the even collections compiled by Efrosin the scribe of the late 15th century. In most of the manuscript books of permanent composition, such as the Kormchaya, Ustav, etc. (with the exception of the Izbornik of 1073 and the Tacticon), the presence or absence of lists of abridged books does not depend on the edition of these books.

The sixteenth-century manuscript reflects a special edition of the Slavonic index, Metropolitan Zosima's Tale of the Denied Books.

== Composition ==
The original translated Byzantine list was intended to separate canonical sacred books from non-canonical, "falsely written" ones. According to the observations of N. A. Kobiak, already in the eleventh century the list did not reflect the repertoire of the apocrypha of Slavonic literature. In the 1073 Izbornik and its lists (manuscripts) 29 names of apocryphal works are named. Of these in Old Church Slavonic and Old Russian literature (11th–mid-18th century) in translations and remakes was known not more than 9:

- Adam (or Adam Covenant – renamed Apocalypse of Moses)
- The Testaments of the Twelve Patriarchs
- Isaiah's Vision
- The Gospel of James
- Peter's Oblation
- The Apocalypse of the Apostles
- The Apocalypse of Paul
- The doctrine of Clement
- The Asenephas

In Slavonic bookwork the lists are considerably expanded to include works by Slavic authors. The Slavonic index proper consists of two parts.

The first, probably of South Slavic origin, includes the Old and New Testament Apocrypha, as well as works related to heretical movements, including Bogomilism:

- From the fourteenth century the articles "On the Tree of the Cross" and "On Our Lord Jesus Christ, How He Was Raised as a Priest" are included. The Bulgarian priest Jeremiah (erroneously called Bogomil in manuscripts from the middle of the fifteenth century onward);
- from the first quarter of the fifteenth century – "As Christ yelled with the plow";
- from the end of the first quarter of the fifteenth century – Apocalypse of Pseudo-Methodius, which is related to the spread of eschatological sentiments in connection with the approaching 7000 year from the creation of the world (1492);
- At the turn of the sixteenth and seventeenth centuries – "That the King called Christ a friend".

The second part, which probably originated in Russia, is a list of so-called "heretical" books:

- some works of "natural science" theme;
- fortune-telling and charodean books – "Charovnik", "Volhovnik", "Hromnik", etc.
- names of some superstitious customs, not related to certain texts: for example, the custom of wearing around the neck a list of "Avgarev epistle" as amulet, writing the names of diseases on apples in order to "take away porcation", etc.

As a rule, the Slavonic index proper is accompanied in manuscripts by various translated lists of true and false books.

There are more than 30 variants of the index titles in the manuscripts, most of which attribute it to the rules of various councils: "Laodicean Council rule 59" (from the fourteenth century), "Rule Chalcedon on defective books" (from the second half of the fifteenth century) "From the Apostolic Commandments, Rule of the Holy Fathers 318, and in Nicaea" (from the fifteenth century) and others. As a rule, under one title a manuscript contains several articles: a list of true Old Testament and New Testament, a list of false books such as the one contained in the Tacticon of Nikon the Montenegrin or Izbornik of 1073, a list of false books of a different, more extensive composition, a list of "heretical" books.

One observes the familiarity of the compilers or copyists of the index with many of the books named in it. The names of the apocrypha in the lists, as a rule, correspond to the names of these works in manuscripts. To the greatest extent the familiarity of Russian scribes with forbidden works is evidenced by the characteristics of the books and comments to their titles, which were given by the compiler of the index. Thus, Mefodiy Patarsky is mentioned as a forbidden author in the lists from the end of the first quarter of the 15th century. Some lists also name his specific work ("Revelation") and give a detailed commentary: "The word from the beginning to the end, in it is written Munt son of Noah and the three years of the earth burning, and that kings were sealed by Alexander the Great. Gog and Magog". Istrin noted that such a commentary could have arisen only under the influence of the full revision of the Revelation, compiled in Rus' in the fifteenth century. In a late fifteenth- and early sixteenth-century list his reader, the elder Paisius, adds the following comment to the title "Moses' Rising": "...that Moses reigned over srats and that he plucked a club from his father-in-law by Raguel in the fence".

Despite the fact that in some cases readers correlated the titles in the index with specific apocrypha, the indexes could not stop the penetration to Russia of apocryphal literature from Byzantium and the South Slavic countries. Some monuments included in the index were widely disseminated, for example, "The Lady's Walk in Troubles", "The Conversation of the Three Saints").

A considerable number of books named in the indexes were known in Russia only by name, such as the Old Testament Apocrypha, such as the Prayer of Joseph, the Revelation of Elijah, Eldad and Modad, Psalms Solomon. Others, primarily fortune-telling books, such as the Charovnik and the Volhovnik, have not survived or have not been found.

The instructions of the list may have been contradictory. Thus, prohibiting stories about Moses in the collections, they allowed reading the same stories in the Paleia: "The Exodus of Moses, the heretics folded crookedly, except the Paleia", which was considered a "true" book.

In a number of copies (manuscripts) of the index the name of the old apocrypha could be replaced by another work, with the same protagonist, but more appropriate to the tastes of the era. For example, at the end of the sixteenth century and the first half of the seventeenth century "The Lady's Way through Troubles", which had been represented in the index since the fourteenth century, was replaced by "The Virgin's Deed", followed by "Our Lady's Dream".

In the later period the lists expand by including the titles of a number of new works. These additions indicate a significant expansion of the repertoire of Russian extra-church literature, which the indexes and similar monuments tried to overcome. At the end of the first third of the seventeenth century, shortly after its appearance, the title satirical of the story "About the Reaper and about Akir" is included in the index. However, the indexes did not fully achieve their goal. The futility of the struggle of the indexes against forbidden literature is evidenced by the even collections of the late fifteenth-century scribe Euphrosine. Two of his collections include indexes. However, in the same collections Euphrosyne placed a number of monuments included by these indices as "false" and "denied": "On the Hierarchy of Christ", extracts from the "Conversation of the Three Saints", "First Gospel of James", "Revelation of Ezra", "On the Good and Evil Hours", several versions of "fables" about Solomon and Cytocrates. In other collections of Euphrosine read an even greater number of apocryphal texts that were banned in lists, including apocryphal prayers and incantations, as well as extracts from "Hromnik" and "Kolyadnik", considered not just banned, but "heretical" books. Meanwhile, Euphrosyne was aware of the "unrighteousness" of such texts, since he placed the apocryphal "Tale of the Twelve Fridays". He wrote: "Do not honor this in the collection, nor manifest it to many."

Nevertheless, the indexes of the renounced books were popular and have survived in a large number of folios (manuscripts).

The Stoglav Synod of 1551, under pain of excommunication, forbade keeping and reading books of divination, calendar-astronomical and astrological content, translated ones: "Rafli", "Six-winged", "Voronograeus", "Ostromius", "Zodeus", "Almanac", "Stargazers", "Aristotelian", "Aristotelian Gates", etc. The same kind of prohibition is contained in "Domostroy," where some of the books named are listed in common with various superstitions and divinations.

In spite of this, the Aristotelian Gates ("Secret Secretorum") and the Sixfold were fully or partially included in manuscripts of ecclesiastical content. The renegade divination literature was of interest to Ivan the Terrible.

Evidence of the interest in indexes and their relevance is the appearance of the first printed text of the index in the Moscow edition of the Kirill Book of 1644.

== Historiography ==
A number of scholars have suggested a connection between the "Tale of the Denied Books" of Metropolitan Zosima and the struggle with the so-called "the Judaizers", which was waged by this metropolitan. The "Tale" mentions a "cathedral" which, having "searched", purged the church of "heretics". A. S. Pavlov supposed that it was about the Council of 1490, and in the mention of "worldly composed psalms" he saw an indication of Psalter, translated in the second half of the 15th century by Jew Theodore. However, as N. A. Kobiak notes, the text about the council against "heretics" in Zosima's "Tale" is an exact repetition of a similar text from Danila Mamyrev's collection of the mid-15th century, and in a more general form the mention of the councils already entered the list of the fourteenth century and refers to the Council of Laodicea of the fourth century. "Composed Secular Psalms" were also mentioned already in the rules of the Council of Laodicea. In the index they first appear at the turn of the fourteenth and fifteenth centuries and, as a rule, are accompanied by a listing of 2–4 names of the psalms themselves. The same applies to the works, the appearance of which is traditionally associated with the "heresy of the Judaizers" – Shestokryl, Logica, Cosmography. According to N. S. Tikhonravov, after the defeat of the "Judaizers" they were included in the index of false books. However, the above works are not named in any index. As Kobiak showed, "The Tale of the Denied Books" goes back to the index included in the Prayer Book of Metropolitan Kyprian. Its earliest list (manuscript) is from the 1450s–1460s.

== See also ==
- Index Librorum Prohibitorum
- Censorship
- Spetskhran
- Federal List of Extremist Materials
