= The word of a certain Christ-lover and zealot for the right faith =

Christian Slavic literature

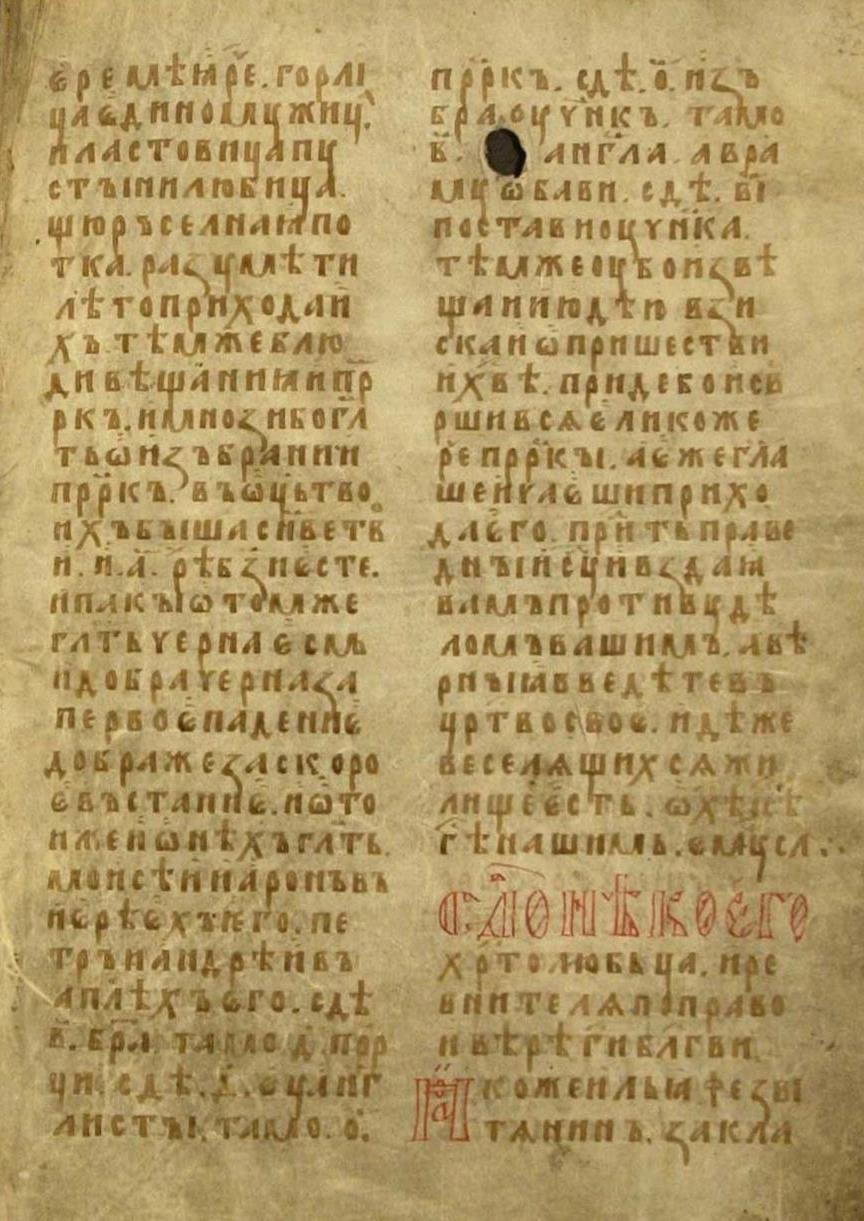
- Beginning of a manuscript in the collection of the Golden Chain, late fourteenth to early fifteenth century
- Full title: Слово нѣкоєго хрістолюбца и рєвнитєлѧ по правои вѣрѣ
- Author(s): unknown
- Date: 11th–14th centuries
- Manuscript(s): at least 18
- Subject: The edification against folk customs, pagan beliefs and rituals

The Word of a certain Christ-lover and zealot for the right faith or The Word of one Christ-lover and zealot on Orthodox Faith (Slovo nekoyego khristolyubtsa i revnitelya po pravoy vere Russian: Слово некоего христолюбца и ревнителя по правой вере), or in shorthand, "The Word") is a significant work of Russian ecclesiastical literature. It is an Orthodox work directed against folk customs and pagan beliefs and rituals.

== Textual criticism ==
"The Word" is included in a large number of folios. N. M. Galkovsky's edition counted 15 manuscripts. Viljo Mansikka indicated three more.

Mansikka distinguished between short and long textual appearances of "The Word." The longest versions are composed of two lists. The rest of the versions are brief editions. The earliest appearances of the text are included in the collection "Zlataya chep" of the late 14th to early 15th century and the Paisiev collection.

In the long version the text reads: "And this has been expounded from books of many words to certain men of Christ, zealous of the right faith, to quell their flatteries, to rebuke them that do such things, to teach the righteous, and to make them holy in the communion of the future age, who hear these holy books, and do what they are told to do for the remission of sins".

== Dating ==
The date of the original authorship is contentious. Several scholars, including Alexander Pypin, Yevgeny Golubinsky, N. M. Galkovsky, attribute "The Word" to the period of the Kievan Rus'. Villo Mancicca dates the text to the 14th century. Evgeny Anichkov believed that "The Word" originated between 1037 and 1054 in Saint Sophia Cathedral, Kyiv, where Parish priests gathered for "cathedral week."

== Origin ==
According to Anichkov, in its original form, the text communicated nothing about paganism and condemned only feasts, games, songs, and the amusements connected with them. The lists of pagan gods and rituals are later expansions. The message, according to Anichkov, is addressed not to the Christian congregation, but to parish priests who had gathered for a council. Later modifications to the text support this hypothesis. In addition to Sacred Scripture, from which the author includes numerous quotations, the text also alludes to apocryphal content from "The Vision of Paul the Apostle." According to Mancicca, the text also alludes to a chronicle. Mancicca considered a South Slavic fragment published by Nikolai Tikhonravov to be one of the principal source materials.

== Authorship ==
Filaret Gumilevsky believed the author of "The Word" was Theodosius of Kiev. According to Tatiana Bulanina, this point of view does not stand up to criticism. Three works also attributed to Theodosius of Kiev include a passage from the Paisiev Collection which begins, "Sitting once to the holy father... and this brought the life of a certain Chrismophile," considerations of chastity (С. 216), and "The words of a certain Christ-lover and the chastisement of a spiritual father" (С. 216—221).

== Influence ==
The antiquity of themes appearing in "The Word" is evidenced by their appearance in a number of works of Old Russian literature, including some dating to the language's early period. Anichkov noted text from "Instruction on the Executions of God," which was attributed to Theodosius the hegumen of Kyiv Pechersk Lavra, "The Word of our holy father" attributed to John Chrysostom, "On how the first pagans believed in idols," "The Word of the Holy Fathers, how it is fitting for Christians to live," and "The Teachings of John Chrysostom." Anichkov believed the influence of "The Word" can be seen in the instruction of Archbishop John, Diocese of Novgorod.

== Literature ==
- Азбукин П. Очерк литературной борьбы представителей христианства с остатками язычества в русском народе: (XI—XIV вв.) // РФВ. — 1896. — № 2. — С. 225—226, 228, 249—250, 259; 1898. — № 1—2. — С. 258.
- Пыпин А. Н. История русской литературы. — СПб., 1898. — Т. 1. — С. 111.
- Голубинский Е. Е. История церкви. — Т. 1, 1-я пол. — С. 827.
- Никольский Н. К. Повременной список. — С. 182—183.
- Гальковский Н. М. Борьба христианства с остатками язычества в Древней Руси. — Харьков, 1916. — Т. 1.
- Mansikka V. J. Die Religion der Ostslaven. Helsinki, 1922, Bd 1. Quellen, S. 147—160.
- История русской литературы. — М.; Л., 1941. — Т. 1. — С. 353—354.
- Казачкова Д. А. Към въпроса за богомилската ерес в Древна Русия през XI в. // Исторически преглед, 1957, г. 13, № 4, с. 64—67.
- Она же. Зарождение и развитие антицерковной идеологии в Древней Руси XI в. // Вопр. ист. религии и атеизма. — М., 1958. — Т. 5. — С. 300—302.
- Łowmiański H. Religia słowian i jej upadek (w. VI—XII). Warszawa, 1979, s. 134—151.
- Podskalsky G. Christentum und theologische Literatur in der Kiever Rus’ (988—1237). München, 1982, S. 253—254.
