= Superstitions of Russians =

Many superstition of Russians are staples of everyday life, and some are even considered common social etiquette despite being rooted in superstition. The influence of these traditions and superstitions varies, and their perceived importance depends on factors such as region and age.

== Customs regarded as superstitions ==
=== Travel ===
- Before leaving for a long journey, travelers, and all those who are seeing them off, must sit for a moment in silence before leaving the house. It is often seen as a time to sit and think of anything one may have forgotten. Another version of the superstition states that the traveler must sit for a moment on or beside their suitcase. An example in Russian: Присядем на дорожку., romanized: prisyadem na dorozhku, lit. 'let's sit on the path')
- Returning home for forgotten items is considered a bad omen.

=== Luck ===
- Knocking on wood is practiced in Russia as in other countries to ward off bad luck.
- Spits over one's shoulder wards off the coming of a bad thing mentioned.
- To meet a woman withy water buckets is considered a bad omen.
- It is considered bad luck to make a toast with an empty glass. If done, the toaster must finish off the bottle of what he had last.
- It is considered bad luck to put an empty bottle back on the table when it is finished.

== "Cause and effect" in Russian superstitions ==
- If your ears or cheeks are hot, someone is thinking or talking about you (usually speaking ill).
- If your nose itches, you'll be drinking soon. For children they might say, "You'll get hit in the nose".
- If your right eye itches, you're going to be happy soon. If your left eye itches, you'll be sad.
- If your lips itch, you'll be kissing someone soon.
- If your right hand itches, you're going to get money soon. It sometimes means you're going to greet someone. If your left hand itches, you're going to give someone money.
- If you have the hiccups, someone is remembering you at this moment.
- If an eyelash falls out you'll receive a gift. If someone finds an eyelash on someone they will sometimes let the person blow it away and make a wish.
- If a fork or spoon falls on the ground, expect a female guest. If a knife falls, expect a male guest.
- If you eat from a knife, you'll be "angry like a dog".
- If someone is not recognized when seen or heard, they will be rich. So if someone calls you on the phone and you don't recognize them you can cheer them up by telling them they'll be rich.
- If someone was talking about you before you entered the room/conversation, then you will live a long and rich life.
- If a cat is washing its face, expect guests soon.
- If a black cat crosses your path, it is bad luck (though not unique to Russian tradition). People will often avoid crossing the place where it crossed, or will at least wait for someone else to cross it first.
- If a hare crosses your path, it is bad luck. This is much less common than the cat superstition, which is understandable given the lack of hares in urban conditions.
- If you spill salt, it is bad luck and is said to bring conflict, but no one will throw salt over their left shoulder.
- If you step on a crack, it is bad luck. This one isn't very common, and Russians who do avoid cracks don't do it in an effort to save their mother's backs.
- If it is raining when you leave a place, it means you'll return, and it is considered a generally good omen.
- If it rains on someone's wedding, it means they'll be wealthy.
- If someone sneezes while telling something, it means they are telling the truth.
- If one or more birds defecate on you or your property (commonly cars), it is good luck, and may bring you riches.
- If you find a bay leaf in your soup (commonly Borshch) while eating, it means you'll get mail from someone.
- If you wear clothes (such as an undershirt) inside out, you will get beaten. Your friend should point this out, wait for you to fix the clothes, and then punch you symbolically. If you noticed it yourself, take the piece of clothing off, put it on the ground and step on it.
- Lucky in cards not lucky in love. This, however, is only a pre-marital superstition. The reason for the division is that marriage is a sacrament in the Russian Orthodox Church, and this sacrament, ordained by God, eviscerates the pre-marital superstition. Thus, when a man is bonded by divine sacrament to a single woman whom he loves the cause and effect is reversed: namely, his married love for a single woman, and her love for him, will bring him good fortune in all endeavors including cards.
- If you wear a shirt backwards, you will become acquainted with someone new.
- In Russian superstition if a couple sets a wedding date and doesn't end up getting married on that date, they can not set another date and should not get married as their union will be cursed.
- Accidentally breaking a glass is considered good luck.
- If one tripped on their left leg and was born on an odd-numbered day, or tripped on their right foot and was born on an even-numbered day, one should ask someone else to slap their corresponding hand in order to negate the bad luck.
- If you have ringing in one of your ears, ask someone which ear is ringing. If they guessed right, you should both make a wish.
- If someone does something bad, a ghost may take a possession owned by the family. If the sinner repents, the ghost will return the item sometime during the week of their birthday.
- If someone whistles inside a house, they will become financially irresponsible and lose money.
- If you find yourself standing between people with identical names, you should make a wish and it will come true.

Russia lacks some of the superstitions Westerners find commonplace. Most Russians are not particularly concerned with the number 13, opening umbrellas indoors or walking under ladders. Archaically though, the number 13 might have been considered a "devil's number". This is because it could only be divided by itself, contrasted with a widely used number 12 for counting.

Communion or hold conversations with demons. Sorcerers primarily used black magic to summon devils. The goals of summoning devils include attaining wealth, fame, approval of superiors, sex, or harming another person. Those that rejected Christianity and sought the Devil felt that the Devil was as strong as God and impious spells were more powerful than prayer.

== Archaic superstitions ==
=== The Unclean force ===
The term "unclean force" (Нечистая сила) refers to devils and all demons and potentially harmful spirits in the Russian pantheon. Although the beings of the unclean force resided primarily in the spirit realm (тот свет), they were able to manifest themselves in this world in many forms, the most well known included the domovoi, leshy, kikimora, vodianoi, and rusalka. Also counted among the unclean force are sorcerers, witches, the undead, and the "unclean dead", including suicides, those who died of drunkenness, victims of accidents and violent deaths, unbaptized infants, and vampires. Likewise, strangers and people of other religions were viewed as possessing the unclean force.

Among these spirits, the domovoi was considered the least dangerous. If angered, the domovoi would act as a poltergeist. Other spirits, like the rusalka, were more malevolent. She was said to lure men to their watery deaths. Among the places where the unclean force was strongest against the Russian peasant were the crossroads, the threshold and the bathhouse.

=== Spoiling ===
Related to the unclean force was the superstitious belief in "spoiling" (порча). One aligned with the unclean force could spoil another through the use of the evil eye or by means of magic. The spoiled person would be inflicted with such maladies and misfortunes as sickness, mental illness, deformity, loss of livelihood, and death. One type of spoiling was a form of hysteria called klikushestvo (кликушество). It caused the bewitched person to shriek, curse, and fall to the floor when in the presence of religious objects or displays.

== See also ==
- Folklore of Russia
- Russian culture
- Slavic mythology
