= Lower mythology =

Myths about minor topics

Lower mythology is a sphere of mythological representations relating to characters who have no divine status, demons and spirits, as opposed to higher gods and the official cult. This opposition is particularly pronounced in world religions.

== History of the study ==
The term was introduced by German ethnographer W. Mannhardt, who was the first to carry out a special study of this mythology. Mannhardt extensively studied mostly representations of spirits associated with the harvest and the broader category, spirits of vegetation, representing the annual cycle of dying and resurrecting vegetation. В. Wundt believed that representations of "vegetation demons" were an intermediate stage between the pre-earthly "totemic cult" and developed cults of gods. James George Frazer considered gods such as Attis, Adonis, Osiris, and Dionysus as related through transitional stages to the dying and resurrecting spirit of vegetation.

At an early stage in the development of mythological ideas, scholars suggest the existence of mythological fetishism, within which things and phenomena were animated and social functions were transferred to them. The demonic being was not at all detached from the object in which it was believed to dwell. Later, as a result of the development of a productive economy, mythology moved towards animism, when the "idea" of the thing and the magical power of the demon began to be separated from the thing itself. The original animism included the idea of the demon as a force determining a person's fate, evil or less often beneficent. In Homer there are many examples of a nameless, faceless, suddenly acting and terrifying demon. Of this instantly arising and just as instantly departing fatal force man has no idea, he cannot call it by name and cannot enter into communion with it. Subsequently, there are ideas of demons of individual things and events with different powers of influence. In developed animism the transformation of a demon or god leads to its anthropomorphism, humanization.

== See also ==
- Demonology
- Folk religion
- Legendary creature
