= Igor Froyanov =

- Born: June 22, 1936; Armavir (Soviet Union)
- Died: December 5, 2020 (aged 84); Saint Petersburg
- Resting place: Smolensky Cemetery
- Alma mater: Stavropol State University
- Occupation: Historian
- Employer: Saint Petersburg State University
- Awards: Honoured Worker of Higher Professional Education of the Russian Federation
- Website: http://froyanov.csu.ru/

Igor Yakovlevich Froyanov (Russian: Игорь Яковлевич Фроянов; 22 June 1936 – 5 December 2020) was a Soviet and Russian historian. Honoured Worker of Higher Professional Education of the Russian Federation (2012). Doctor of Sciences in Historical Sciences (1973), professor at the Saint Petersburg State University (since 1979). From 1982 to 2001, Froyanov served as the dean of the Faculty of History. From 1983 to 2003, he headed the Department of Russian History. He was a member of the Union of Writers of Russia.

He was born into a Kuban Cossack family. His father, a major in the Red Army, suffered from Stalin's repressions.

In 1954 Igor graduated from school. He served in the Army from 1955 to 1958. He studied at the Faculty of History at the Leningrad State University.

In 1966, he defended his Candidat thesis. In 1973, he defended his doctoral thesis.

He criticized Yeltsin's policies. In the 2018 Russian presidential election, Igor Froyanov was a trusted representative of Pavel Grudinin.

He is buried in the Smolensky Cemetery.
