= Sveta Nedelja =

Sveta Nedelja and Sveta Nedjelja (lit. 'Holy Sunday') may refer to:

- Sveta Nedelja, Istria, a municipality in Croatia
- Sveta Nedelja, Zagreb County, a town in Croatia (also named Sveta Nedjelja before 1991)
- Sveta Nedjelja, Hvar (or Sveta Nedilja), a village in Dalmatia, Croatia

== See also ==
- Sveta Neđelja, an island in Montenegro
- Holy Sunday
