= Ognyena Maria =

Slavic goddess

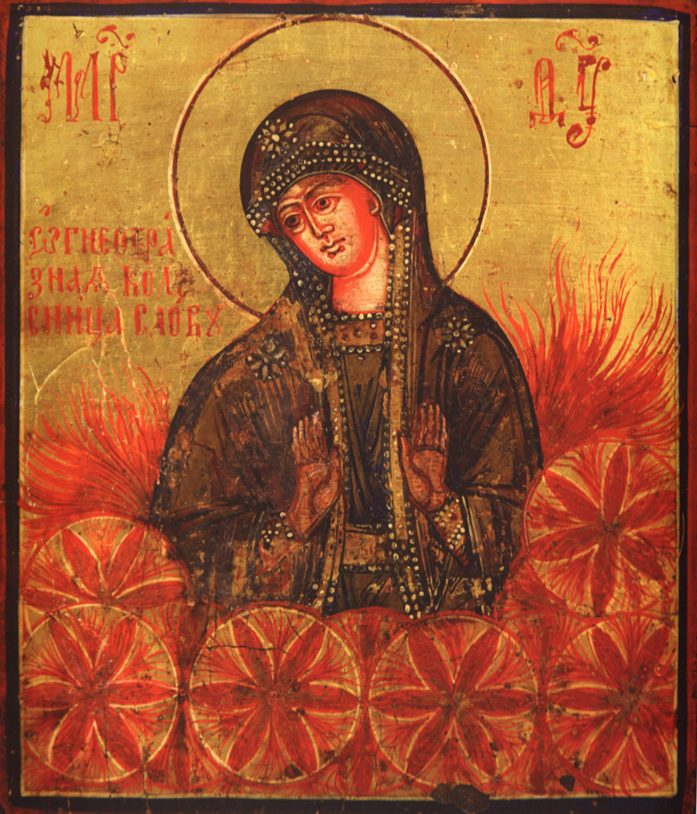
"The Fiery Chariot of the Word", 19th-century Russian icon of the Theotokos as Ognyena Maria.

In Slavic mythology, Ognyena Maria (literally "Fiery Mary") is a fire goddess who is the sister and assistant of the thunder god, Perun. Ognyena Maria originates as a conflation of the figures of Margaret the Virgin and the Virgin Mary, both regarded as sisters of Saint Elias.

This divinity also appears with southern Slavs, and is usually considered to be the sister of the thunder god/saint. She was also associated with rain or the sea, or with Lazarus (Марина Лазоревая) and azure flashes of lightning.

Ognyena Maria’s feast in the folk calendar of the Slavs is on July 17, on the Julian calendar (around 30 July).

== Belarus ==
In Belarus, she is prayed towards for healing from ailments: "Добры вечар, цёмна ноч! На табе, вада, маю бяду, а мне маё здароўе назад аддай" ("Good evening, dark night! I leave my troubles to you, water, and give me my health in return.")

== Bulgaria ==
In Bulgaria, she is celebrated on July 22, as the day she prevents fires. A strict ban is observed on housework to prevent any disastrous fires on that day, as the summer at July was hot enough to start such outbreaks. They believe that anyone who breaks the ban will suffer destructive fires that will break out against them and their households. Her festival culminates a celebration on 15–22 July, related to the Goreshtnitsi Festival at the 28–30 July.

As the mistress of snakes, people were also forbidden from using ropes and threads on her feast days. During those days, snakes were said to hide in the underworld.

The first day of Goreshtnitsi was when all fires were extinguished, and no new fires will be lit until the third day, when the Bulgarians celebrate the fires of the Holy Spirit. Some do it to celebrate Ognyena Maria's power over fire.

Some Bulgarians believe that as she is the sister of Saint Elijah, she hides from him on St. Elias' Day, to ensure that he would not be so delighted, that his lightning and thunder would destroy everything.

== Russia ==
In Russia, she is considered as the daughter of a king from the sea. As she felt bored of life in his palace, she fled to land. Her father got angry from this, and so he rained down darts of lightning on her birthday, that anyone who saw the lightning will be blind. Her birthday falls around Trinity Week (also known as Русальная неделя, or Rusalka Week), or St. Elias' Day.

People were advised not to swim or bathe on the days leading to Trinity Week, as it is believed that mermaids would drown anyone who does so on any water. If anyone has to, crosses, garlic, magic charms, and wormwood were used to stave the mermaids off.

== Serbia and Bosnia and Herzegovina ==
In Serbia and parts of Bosnia and Herzegovina with Bosnian Serb population, including Republic of Srpska, Ognjena Marija is usually associated with Margaret the Virgin and along with Saint Elijah, is considered as one of the fiery saints (Serbian: огњевити свеци, romanized: ognjeviti sveci).

According to the traditional views, the people are usually forbidden to do any kind of work on Ognjena Marija's day, as it won't bring them any good. This even includes simple tasks such as putting thread into needle or even washing ones clothes with washing machine. It is believed that the disobedient people will be punished with extensive fires, which will burn their crops, haystacks and homes. The similar beliefs exist for the Saint Elijahs day, where instead of fires, the disobedient people and their property will be stricken with thunder, ultimately resulting in either decimation of their food supplies and shelter or even in death.

In contrast to that, the families that celebrate Ognjena Marija as their Slava, are allowed to do some work which is required to hold celebrations on that day. It is said that whichever family has Ognjena Marija as their Slava is always certain that they'll always have the fullest crop yield.

== Ukraine ==
In Ukraine, villagers would pay attention to the lightning in the sky, hoping that on Ognyena Maria's day, this will indicate that God will send rain for their crops.

== Sources ==
- Rouček, Joseph Slabey. Slavonic Encyclopaedia. Philosophical Library, 1949.
- Zhuravlyov, Anatoly Fedorovich (2005). "Язык и миф. Лингвистический комментарий к труду А. Н. Афанасьева «Поэтические воззрения славян на природу»". Традиционная духовная культура славян, Индрик, Института славяноведения РАН (Institute for Slavic Studies of the Russian Academy of Sciences).
