= Polevik =

Slavic mythological creature

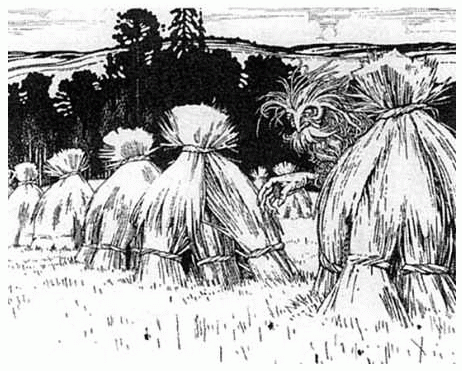
Polevik by Ivan Bilibin

Polevik or Polewik in Slavic mythology are field spirits that appear as a deformed creatures with different coloured eyes and grass instead of hair. They appear either at noon or sunset and wear either all black or all white suits. They are also described in south Russian folklore as field spirits with green hair. According to local beliefs they lead wandering people in a field astray, give them diseases or ride them over with their horses if they are found asleep.

If a person falls asleep on the job after drinking, the Polewiki might murder them. Appeasing the Polewiki requires two eggs, a rooster, a toad, and a crow placed in a ditch when no one is looking.

Polevik stands in contrast to the demoness of fields appearing at noon: Poludnisa, 'Poluden' meaning 'noon'. A tall, beautiful girl dressed in white. She enjoyed pulling the hair of peasants working in the midday. She also helped little children to get lost in the cornfields.
