= Sacred history =

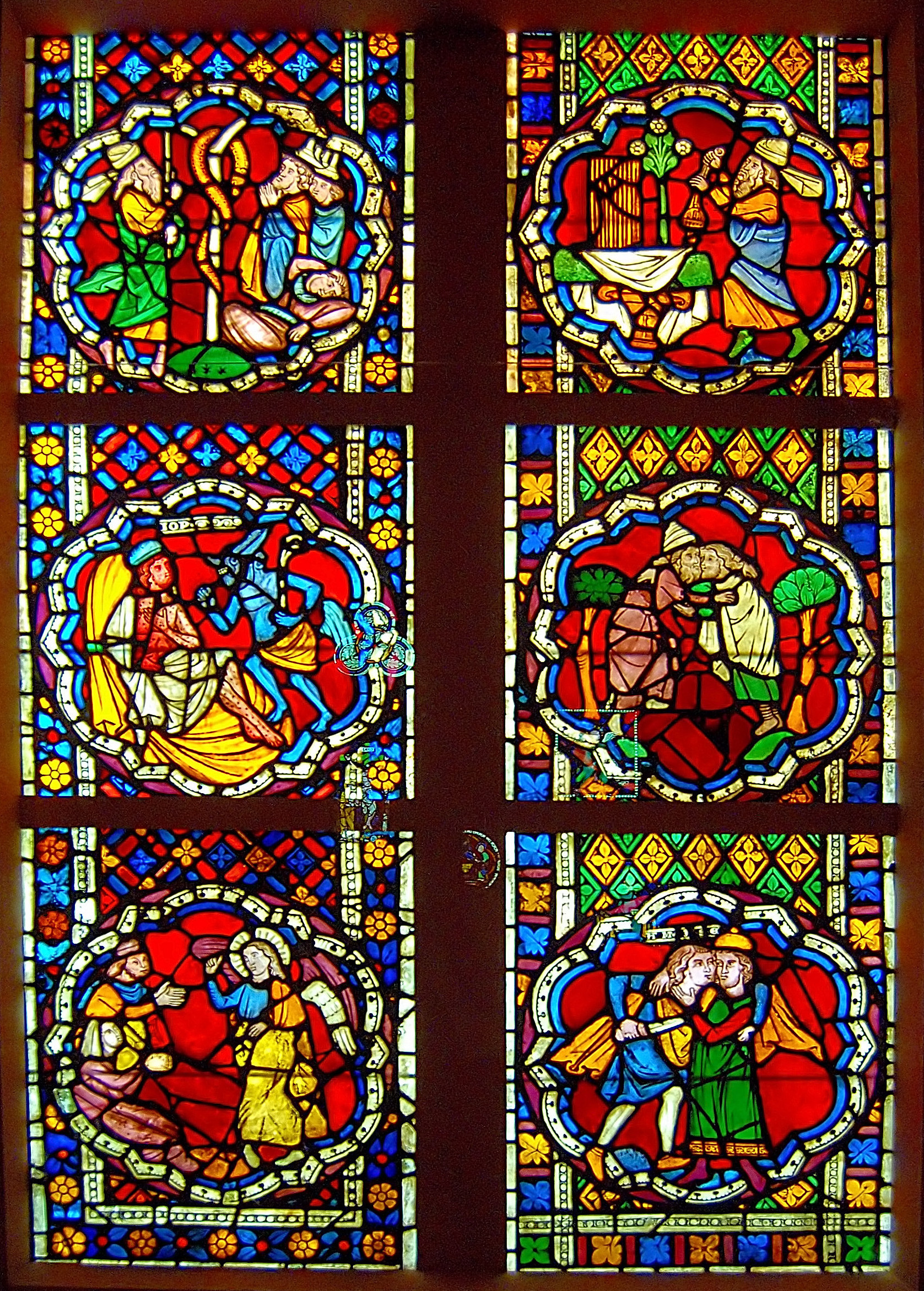
Scenes from the Old Testament, Gothic stained glass window in the Musée de l'Oeuvre N otre-Dame, Strasbourg

Sacred history is the retelling of history narratives "with the aim of instilling religious faith" regardless of whether or not the narratives are founded on fact.

In the context of the Hebrew texts that form the basis of Judaism, the term is used for all of the historical books of the Bible – i.e., Books of Kings, Ezra–Nehemiah and Books of Chronicles – spanning the period of the 10th to 5th centuries BC, and by extension also of the later books such as Maccabees and the books of the New Testament. The term in this sense is used by Thomas Ellwood in Sacred history, or, the historical part of the holy scriptures of the Old and New Testaments, published 1709. Parts of the Torah, such as the story of Moses and Exodus, may have historical kernels, but they are highly embellished and difficult to reconstitute.

== See also ==
- The Bible and history
- Exegesis
- Historical theology
