= Likhoradka =

Female spirit in Slavic mythology

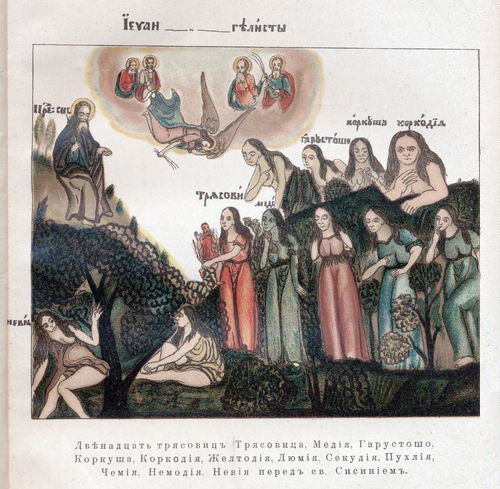
The shakes from St. Sisinius, Four Evangelists and the archangel Michael

Likhoradka (Russian: Лихорадка, Serbian: Милоснице or Milosnice) or tryasavitsa is a female spirit in Slavic mythology. Likhoradka was purported to be able to possess a person's body and cause sickness. In some tales, she is considered a creation of the dark deity Chernobog. Later Russian legends describe 12 Likhoradkas with individual names associated with special illnesses. In modern Russian, the word likhoradka has obtained the meaning "fever". As a mythological figure, Likhoradka was related to the figure of Chuma, which in modern Russian is the term for plague. Likhoradka was sometimes portrayed as a tall woman with disheveled hair, a pale face and a white dress who brought sickness to people she tried to touch or to kiss.

The word likhoradka comes from ancient Russian likho (harm or bad luck) and radet which means to endeavor.

== Sources ==
- Ryan, William Francis (1999). The Bathhouse at Midnight: An Historical Survey of Magic and Divination in Russia. Penn State Press. ISBN 9780271019673.

== See also ==
- Mokosh
- Slavic mythology
