= Zagovory =

East Slavic incantations

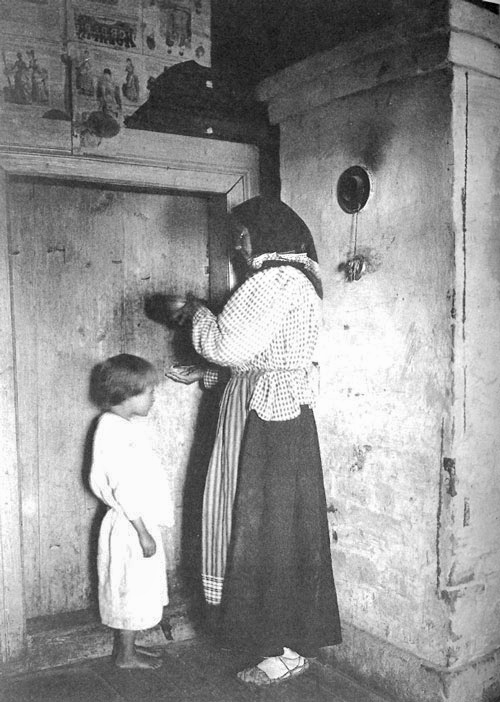
A folk healer applying 'holy water' on a child, Russia, 1914

Zagovory (singular zagovor) is a form of verbal folk magic in Eastern Slavic folklore and mythology. Users of zagovory use incantations to enchant objects or people.

== Etymology ==
The present-day Russian word zagovor (заговор) corresponds to the English word conjuration, which once meant a 'conspiracy, plot, act of plotting'. Zagovor ('what is performed with speech') originates from Russian folklore. So does the term nagovor (наговор), with its prefix of initiation na- and the root -govor ('speech'), meaning 'what is launched with speech'.

Their slight difference in sense can be seen in constructions like "zagovory from maleficium"/"from bullets" (defensive, apotropaic aspect) and nagovory onto water (to make it "healing"). The latter phrase seems to reflect a more offensive action. (Note: It also resembles the difference between evocation and invocation in the Western mystery tradition.) (Note: Such descriptive terms as whispering or just words were also in popular use. An obsolete term was recorded in Dal's Dictionary: veschba Russian: вещба, made from the verb veschati Russian: вещать "tell/speak", "foretell/divine" stem (as in the adjective veschiy вещий "wise", "cognizant") and -ba suffix, used mainly to form verbal action nouns, like -ing in English, thus meaning "doing of the wise, cognizant". Veschba has deep linguistic roots cognate with the Sanskrit word véda "knowledge, wisdom" and going back to the Proto-Indo-European root *u̯eid-, meaning "see" or "know".)

The Ukrainian zamovliannia (замовляння) and Belarusian zamowy (замовы) are semantically identical to the Russian zagovory, as they both possess the root -mov ('speech'). Both of these East Slavic words are close to the Polish term zamawianie. Polish folklore retains rudiments of verbal magic as zamawianie choroby ('popular healing').

== History ==
The practice of zagovory arose from pagan prayers and incantations, and so was initially based on the belief in the power of the human word. Hence followed the importance of exact pronunciation of the words (whether whispered or sung) as well as exact observing the associated rites. A great deal of life stamina was obligatory for a performer of the rites. As an example of this, a zagovory practitioner should have either a full set of teeth, or a knife as a symbolic substitute for teeth that were missing.

Originally part of the art of a volkhv (Cyrillic: волхв; Polish: wołchw), who disappeared during the prosecution of the Eastern Orthodox Church, the zagovory tradition survived until the 20th century in popular folk culture, often under the guise of a noncanonical Christian prayer.

In the Russian Empire, zagovory praxes were for centuries prosecuted by its church and by its secular, caesaropapist authorities (Note: Formally speaking, Russia became caesaropapist starting from church reform of Peter the Great.) (at least from mid-17th till mid-19th century). Russian archives yielded more than 600 cases of church and civil prosecution of witchcraft, blasphemy and rational heresies in the 18th century. Even in 1832, after Digest of Laws of the Russian Empire had been first codified under the leadership of Mikhail Speransky, (Note: Count Speransky is often referred as 'father of Russian liberalism'.) witchcraft and sorcery still remained a subject of the secular Penal law.

For the sake of survival zagovory tradition began to mimic Christianity. Zagovory imagery became saturated with Christian themes and motifs, used as a reference base for performing magic acts. However within Byzantine written tradition (which embraced the Southern Slavs cultural intermediation) both Christian orthodoxy and some heterodox manuscripts circulated, which might echo back local heathen concepts.

For example, one of the zagovory (apparently influenced by christianization, though representing rather a specific vision) named "how to heal wounds" said "as Jesus Christ having been crucified felt no pain, (Note: This is rather a monophysite idea of the purely divine nature of Christ, different from the Orthodox dogma of dyophysitism.) so may this person I heal feel no pain from any wounds, from any illnesses".

Another layer in zagovory heritage could be of Western origin. Each of the motifs shared by East and West Slavs has West European (mostly Germanic) matches. This indicates that West Slavic charms served as a mediator between the East Slavic tradition and Western influences.

The magical formula "Stop, blood, as still in the wound, as water/Jesus in the Jordan" is an example of a treated person's bleeding wound assimilation with a medieval apocryphal story of how the Jordan waters stopped flowing when Jesus entered them. It is attested in Belarus, Ukraine, somewhat rare in South and West Russia. As for other Slavic traditions, the formula occurs in Poland and, even more commonly, in Polish texts recorded in Lithuania; it is also found in Czech charms, though intended against disorders other than bleeding.

Geographically the Eastern Slavic zagovory tradition area could be roughly divided into two subareas (with their own subtraditions, correspondingly).

One of them is the tradition of the Russian North and adjoining Central Russian regions. This tradition was less influenced by neighboring cultures through direct contacts, though strongly influenced by the manuscript tradition. As a result it is not too diverse in the composition of plots and motifs. But the most famous plots, motifs and formulas which are considered an authentic feature of Russian (and all East Slavic) zagovory (such as the motive of the sacred center, Alatyr stone on Buyan island amid holy sea) seem to come from there.

Within the second tradition, covering most of Ukraine and Belarus, as well as the south and west Russian regions, the West and South Slavic (as well as Byzantine) influence manifested itself to the greatest extent. The result is the coexistence and active interaction of plots, motifs and poetic formulas of different origins.

== Mythological center and assimilation formulas ==
While the idea of the mythological center is totally absent in incantations of West and South Slavs, it is known in the folklore of all East Slavs, especially in Russian tradition of zagovory.

In Eastern Slavic folk religion the concept of Navel of the World is embodied by a sacred stone Alatyr (frequently referred as white and hot), located somewhere in the East (either in a pristine ("clear") field or Buyan island amid a holy sea/ocean).

The Alatyr appears in most of the zagovory under a variety of names. Much less than usually it is replaced by a sacred tree (for instance, a willow or a white birch) or a non-specified Christian church.

Appeals to such natural phenomena as dawn with red sun (and Eastern side of the world as such), young (new) moon, stars, winds are also very frequent.

As to personalized phenomena in those mythopoetic texts, one can see that heathen and Christian characters are often interchangeable. For instance, in different versions of the same zagovory, the supreme power that a practitioner applies to is either Maria (Mother of God) or "Dawn the Red (Note: This is a typical in Old Russian language double sense for red as both "of rising sun color" and "beautiful", just like for Red Square.) Maiden" (Zorya).

In some of the zagovory a practitioner appeals to Western side of the world for help in maleficium. Nevertheless, the absolute majority of zagovory texts focused on good deeds, such as healing people and livestock, attracting luck, love affairs, wedding protection, birth support and public relations. In Western Siberia a zagovor was written down, named "for good deeds", which should have been read thrice around new moon. It said: "...I behold a young crescent with golden horns, give, my God, golden horns to new moon, so give to me, for good deeds..."

Another type of zagovor involved love magic "just as doves live in love, so would we with so-and-so do..." The practitioner performing this zagovor (recorded in Perm Governorate) had to perform a bird sacrifice: the young man had to catch and stab a dove and knead its fat into dough to bake a kind of a small kalach, which he then had to feed to the girl he loved, saying as he did so the short incantation quoted above.

A recorded in 1648 nagovor onto wax named "how to endure a torture" established that "both heaven and earth are made of bast", and then made a wish "just as the dead in the earth feel nothing, may so-and-so likewise feel no pain from any atrocities, any tortures".

The most usual beginning of a Russian North zagovor was "blessed I rise, setting forth through doors and gates opening to the East, to the Eastern side, to the pristine field, to the sea-ocean, onward to the holy island of God... where lies the stone Alatyr..."

In the middle of zagovory the practitioners were influencing reality by speculative assimilation their reality situation with natural or sacred phenomena, as in this haemostatic example for curing a bleeding body part: "... just as the stone Alatyr yields no water, may I yield no blood ... neither a hen yields any milk, a cock any egg, nor would so-and-so bleed... neither blood from a bone, nor water from a stone..."

The typical ending of zagovory (accompanied by symbolism of both key and lock) often included the statement "May my words be (both) elastic and plastic".

== Humanities ==
In Russian humanities, the term zagovory is often used broadly, for any manifestation of faith in the magic power of the human word, thus applied to completely different cultural phenomena of the humankind (from Anglo-Saxon metrical charms to Atharvaveda's suktas).

== See also ==
- Anglo-Saxon metrical charms
- Galdr
- Apocryphal Prayer
- Merseburg charms
- Norito and Kotodama
