= Mokosh =

Slavic deity

Mokosh мокошь
- Member of Vladimir's pantheon
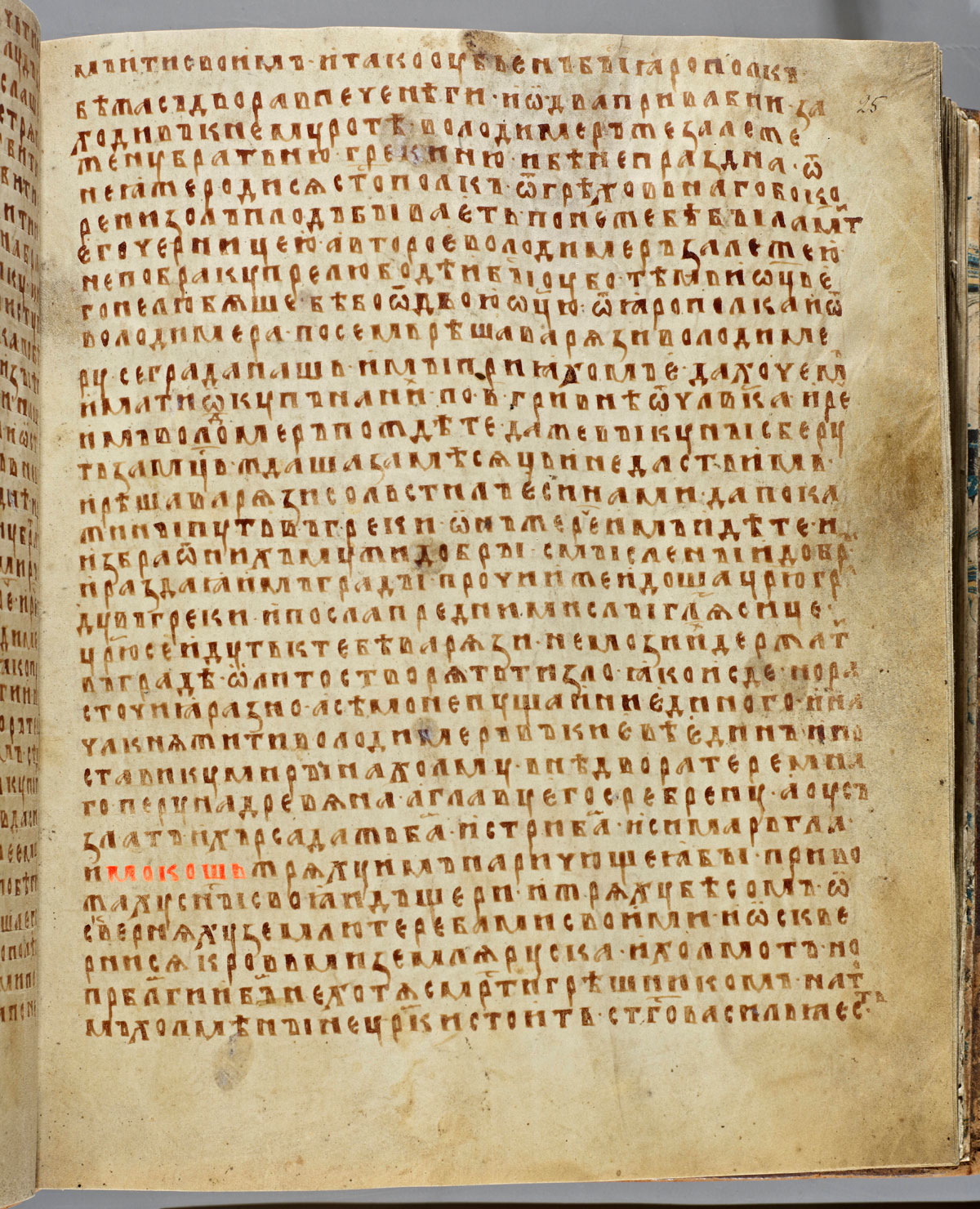
- The twenty-fifth page of Laurentian Codex, with mention of the pantheon of Kyiv, 1377. Mokosh's name is marked in red.
- Texts: Primary Chronicle and other dependent texts
- Gender: Female

Mokosh (Note: Old East Slavic: мокошь, romanized: mokošĭ /ˈmɔkɔɕɪ/ Belarusian: Мо́каш, romanized: Mókaš [ˈmɔkaʂ] Russian: Мо́кошь, romanized: Mókošʹ [ˈmokəʂ] Rusyn: Мо́кош, romanized: Mókoš, IPA: [ˈmɔkɔʃ] Ukrainian: Мо́кош, romanized: Mókoš [ˈmɔkoʃ]) (/ˈmɒkɒʃ/ MOK-osh) is a Slavic goddess. No narratives about this deity have survived: Mokosh was mentioned in various sermons (called Words and Teachings) against Paganism along with the vilas, but is not described by them, and all modern descriptions are reconstructions.

In academia, the opinion has spread that the cult of Mokosh has passed to the folk-Christian Paraskeva Friday, the personification of Friday associated with water and spinning. Because of this identification, Friday began to be considered a day dedicated to the goddess, and a conclusion about the popularity of Mokosh among women in Christian times was drawn. In later studies, the idea of an identification with Paraskeva was criticized because Paraskeva's association with spinning, water, and Friday has Christian rather than pagan roots.

According to etymological reconstruction, Mokosh was the goddess of waters and fertility. Later, according to most researchers, she was reflected in bylinas and zagovory as Mat Zemlya, the personification of Earth in East Slavic folklore. Another reconstruction was made on the basis of ethnography; at the end of the 19th century, the names kikimora as Mokusha or Mokosha were recorded in the Russian North. The coincidence is explained by kikimora being a demonized version of the goddess and, by approximating between the two, researchers have portrayed Mokosh as the goddess of love and birth, with a connection to night, the moon, spinning, sheep farming and women's economy. Spinning was the occupation of several European goddesses of fate, which led to the characterization of Mokosh as a deity who controls fate. This reconstruction disagrees with data on her etymology, which shows spinning could not have been the deity's main role.

The Slavic version of the basic myth theory, based on ethnographic and linguistic data, depicts Mokosh as Perun's wife. It is believed Mokosh cheated on Perun with Veles, causing Perun to kill Mokosh's children. The theory has not been recognized in academia. The supposition Mokosh is depicted on the Zbruch Idol and on North Russian 19th-century embroideries has also been rejected. Archaeologist Boris Rybakov's theory the goddess' original name was Makosh is not supported by other researchers.

== Name and characteristics ==
In Old East Slavic texts, the name Mokosh is rendered as Mokošĭ (мокошь), Mokŭšĭ (мокъшь) – in ancient texts uppercase was not used. According to Oleg Trubachyov, the form Mokŭšĭ was formed through the secondary adideation of *Mokošь and *kъšь "fate". Grammatically, the theonym Mokosh belongs to the feminine gender, from which it is inferred that the deity was specifically a goddess. In older studies and later chronicles, she may have appeared to be a male deity, but this variant is secondary to the original. According to the most-reasonable and widespread etymology the theonym was formed by the suffixal method from the Proto-Slavic stem *mok- meaning "wet" with the suffix *-ošь. Vladimir Toporov and Vyacheslav Ivanov comment this etymology is "indisputable", understanding her name as "She who is wet". The first to put forward such an etymology was Vatroslav Jagić, who believed the theonym is a translation or an amplification of the Greek word malakiya, and therefore Mokosh was a literary fiction. Toporov, Ivanov and Max Vasmer consider Jagić's position to be incorrect.

According to Michał Łuczyński, the theonym may have appeared after the 3rd century AD due to the occurrence of the [š] sound, which arose in Slavic languages as part of the first palatalization. He derives the name of the goddess from the unattested noun *mokošь "someone/something wet" because the suffix *-ošь forms the names of the bearers of features, and he drives this noun from the v-tematic *moky (gen *mokъve) "wet place, mud" (cf. Polish dial. mokwa, Ukrainian mokva) and compares the name Mokosh to other names ending in -osh that are derived from v-thematic words with topographical meaning, e.g. Old Polish Bagosz (< *bagy), Narosz (< *nary). In connection with this etymology, he considers Mokosh to be a "pluvial goddess with uranic characteristics". Similarly, Valeriy Mokiyenko understands the theonym to derive from a word meaning "moist, swampy place". Toporov, Ivanov, and Łuczyński believe the theonym Mokosh is a later epithet that replaced the original, unknown name of the deity. Ivanov and Toporov compare the etymology with Lithuanian makusyti "to splash", "to walk on mud"; makasyne "slush", "mud", "mixture", "mess".

Vasmer and many modern academics consider Mokosh to be the goddess of fertility, waters and earth, which brings her closer to the later Mat Zemlya, who is often mentioned in bylinas and zagovory. Aleksander Gieysztor commented that the association with Mat Zemlya is shared by most researchers. Mokiyenko and Henryk Łowmiański also suggested a connection with rain.

Linguist Andrey Zaliznyak and religious academic Andrzej Szyjewski have likened Mokosh to the Iranian Anahita because the latter is also called "Wet" or "Broad, Spread out". In a similar way, philologist Nikolay Zubov links her to the Scythian goddess of earth and water Api. On the basis of their approximation with Anahita, Toporov and Ivanov attribute the function of procreation to Mokosh and consider the goddess Zhiva to be her "higher hypostasis", opposite to the "low hypostasis" that is Mokosh.

Celtologist Viktor Kalygin approximated Mokosh to the Irish goddess Macha, in his opinion originally the goddess of fertility. He raised the theonym Macha to *mokosiā, which “exactly corresponds to the name of the Slavic goddess Mokosh.” This etymological coincidence is supported by linguist Václav Blažek. Religious scholar Patrice Lajoye points out that Mokosh and Macha have a number of features in common. The theonym Macha is related to the following appellatives: Old Irish macha "cow paddock, milking parade ground or field", machaire "large field or plain", which were formed after the spirantization ⟨k⟩ of three possible Proto-Celtic forms with the meaning "plain": *MakViā, *MakVviā, *MakVsiā, where V is the Celtic ⟨a⟩ or ⟨o⟩. Celtologist Garrett Olmsted derives the theonym Macha from another form of PC *magos "plain, field". The common semantic meaning for Macha and Mokosh may be "moist soil", leading to the meanings "field, meadow" on the one hand and "water nymph", "fairy" or "fertility goddess" on the other. Macha was understood by the Irish as a trifunctional goddess: as seer, warrior and guarantor of prosperity. Mokosh, unlike Macha, was not a warrior, but from the 16th century her name was used to refer to witches and healers, indicating a possible function as a prophetess. Irish mythology tells the story of a widowed villager, Cruinniuc, to whom Macha arrived one day in the form of a beautiful girl and wordlessly began to care for his home. She became pregnant by Cruinniuc, and from that moment on, their home was prosperous. Later, as a result of breaking the order, Macha tells Cruinniuc that he has broken the contract, so she leaves him and curses the local men to experience labor pains for five days and four nights for nine generations. This view of Macha as a house fairy correlates with ethnographic data about Mokosh as a house spirit.

=== Obsolete and questionable etymologies ===
Slavist Grigory Ilinsky put forward a hypothesis for the theonym's origin based on parallels with the Baltic languages. According to him, the theonym Mokosh has a counterpart in Lithuanian in the words makstýti ("to weave") mèksti ("to knit"), and mãkas ("purse"); related to the Russian moshna ("bag, purse"), and thus the theonym comes from Proto-Slavic *mokos- ("spinning", "weaving"). Toporov and Ivanov, who are proponents of the moisture etymology, "rehabilitate" Ilinsky's etymology, seeing a connection in the Lithuanian stems in the words mazgas ("knot"); megzti ("to knit", "to tie") with mazgoti ("to wash"). ESSJa and Martin Pukanec called Ilinsky's etymology "hypothetical".

Boris Rybakov considered Makosh to be a more accurate reading of the goddess' name, dividing the theonym into two parts: ma- and -kosh, where ma- was short for mother (Old East Slavic мати, mati), approaching a certain Cretan-Mycenaean goddess named Ma in a culture very distant from the Slavs. He understood the second part -kosh as an Old East Slavic word meaning "fate". Rybakov thus translates this theonym as "Mother of good fate", identifying her with the goddess of fate, and also at the same time as "Mother of good harvests", since fruit could be placed in the basket (see *košь), adding that Mokosh is also the goddess of fertility, as well as the "Mother of luck", since, in his opinion, the harvest is luck.

Leo Klejn, who sticks to the reconstruction of Mokosh as the goddess of women's labor, particularly spinning, criticizes Rybakov, noting that such functions are not supported by anything. The etymology is also criticized: mother can be shortened to ma mainly in the language of children. Klejn points out that in Russian, compound words are constructed differently: the main noun stands at the end and the defining word at the beginning, and gives such examples as Bogo-matier and Daz-bog, so the expected form of a name would be *Koshma. The word is indeed found in Russian, but is of Tatar origin. The notation Makosh itself is not standard in chronicles, unlike Mokosh. ESSJa, Toporov, and Ivanov reject Rybakov's etymology.

According to Nikolay Galkovsky, the name Mokosh was borrowed from an unknown source. Evgeny Anichkov believed that the name was derived from the ethnonym of Finno-Ugric group, the Mokshas, part of the Mordvins, which he believes explains why Vladimir the Great had to establish statues of Slavic gods: The gods of Vladimir's pantheon were of non-Slavic origin, where Perun was said to have been brought from Scandinavia as the personal god of the Rurikids, and other gods established by Vladimir, such as Mokosh, were gods of peoples neighboring the Slavs, whose statues were established by Vladimir to centralize his power. Anichkov compared Finnish toponyms such as Moksha, which is a right tributary of the Oka, Ropsha, Shapsha, Kapsha, Kiddeksha with the name of the goddess.

Viljo Mansikka, on the other hand, believed that Mokosh was derived from the Finnish demon Moksha. This view has not met with widespread acceptance. Henryk Łowmiański, who had no doubts about the Slavic etymology, considers the demon Moksha to be most likely a loan from the Slavs, or that the sound similarity is coincidental; Gieysztor also considered the demon to be a loan. Later researchers Nikolaĭ Mokshin and Zubov denied the Finno-Ugric origin of Mokosh. Toporov, Iwanov and ESSJa share a similar point of view. Mikhail Vasilyev believes that the connection with the Finnish ethnonym Moksha is coincidental, while the very "affiliation of Mokosh with Slavic paganism is indisputable". Michal Téra suggested that the Mokosh was borrowed from the Slavs and later demonized.

Etymologies connecting theonym with Sanskrit makhas "rich", "noble", or, according to Natalya Guseva, moksha "liberation," and "death" are questionable; as well as the relationship with Ancient Greek mákhlos "lustful", "violent", with Old Lithuanian kekše "prostitute", Avestan maekantis; and "tree sap." Thracian origin of Mokosh is also doubtful. Gieysztor called the etymology of Vittore Pisani, who considered the theonym to be a word composed of the roots mot- "to spool, to reel" and -kos "abundance", "unbelievable".

=== Onomastics ===
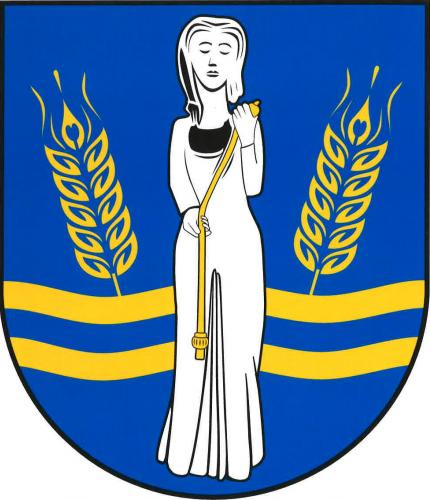
Contemporary coat of arms of the village of Mokošín in the Czech Republic, which may be named after Mokosh

There is onomastic data that can be linked to Mokosh: the Croatian masculine surname and given name Mokoš, the masculine terms makesh, mokesh in the Russian proverb Bog ne makesh, chem-nibud da poteshit; mokush "rusalka"; mokosha "troublesome person"; in Yaroslavl region mokosha "phantom, ghost". In Tver and Novgorod regions mokshit "to cry, beg for something". In Novgorod meaning "to obsessively demand something, to pester with requests" is also attested. Russian dialects include the words mokosya "foolish, stupid woman", "whore, hussy" and Mokrosh, Mokresh meaning the constellation Aquarius. From the Belarusian family Mokish., the proper noun Mokosha, Makosha Khlopun was attested in Pskov's census book from 1585, belonging to cannon maker.

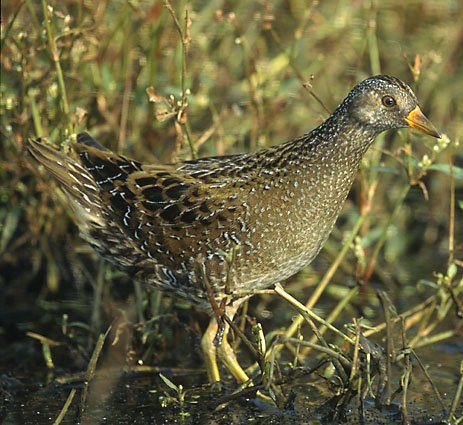
In Slovene language spotted crake is also called mokoš, and in Russian regionalisms chyortova kurica, lit. "devil's hen"

The toponyms of the Czech village Mokošín was attested since the 11th century, and hill Mokošin Vrch; Slovene former stream Mókoš; Sorbian Мосоcize, Mockschiez; Polish Mokoszyn, Mokosznica, Mokossko, Mokos; located near Stralsund in the former Polabian lands of Germany, the Old Polabian toponym Muuks, Mukus attested in 1310; The modern town of Mobschatz, northwest of Dresden, was named Mococize in 1091. Near Pegnitz in northeastern Bavaria there is a village of Moggast, which, in the 14th century, was called Mochcus or Mokoš; Croatian Mokosica near Dubrovnik, mountain Mukoša near Marloh and smaller mountains Mukos, Mokoš and Mokos; Macedonian Mukos; Mokoshinsky monastyr in Chernihiv Oblast, Russia, and swampy area, Mokoshino boloto in Belarus. There was a wasteland or lye called Mokoshevo in Cherepovetsky Uyezd the ethnographer Mikhail Gerasimov noted.

It is likely the onomastics materials speak of the Proto-Slavic antiquity of the goddess, or the toponyms are derived from *mokosъ ("floodplain meadow") or directly from the stem root *mok-. Zubov said in light of the word mokosha as a term for a troublesome person, the relationship with Mokosh becomes problematic. Ilyinsky lists a number of toponyms (Note: Makushi, Makushenki, Makushevo, Makusheno, Mokushi, Mokshino, Mokshitsa, Makushikha, Makushevskaya, Moksheykovo, Makshyno, Maksheya) similar to the theonym, but denies their kinship, recognizing toponyms derived from the root *mok- ("to (get) wet"), from words makushka, mak ("poppy") and from dialectal form of given name Maximus: Mokey. Linguist Stanisław Urbańczyk considers the correlation of toponyms with Mokosh to be questionable.

Toporov associates Mokosh with a character from a Slovenian fairy tale called Mokoška, Mokuška, Mokoška, which is also known as Lahnwaberl or Lamwaberl. The story was recorded in 1855 by Davorin Trstenjak, who heard it from Rudolf Gustav Puff in Lower Styria According to the tale:

Lamwaberl used to live in Grünau, a marshy place not far away from Šent Florjan Square, near the Ložnica [river] that often overflowed its banks. Archaeological artifacts confirm that in the olden times the place had been cultivated. A lone farming estate is situated there now, but once upon a time there stood the castle of Mokoška, a heathen princess who lived in it. The castle was surrounded by gardens that were always green. She occasionally helped people but sometimes also harmed them; she was especially wont to taking children with her. At long last, God punished her. On a stormy night, the castle and all its gardens sank into the ground. But Mokoška was not doomed. She continued to appear, disguised in different female forms. She still carries off children, especially those who have been neglected by their parents

== Sources ==
=== Old East Slavic sources ===
Mokosh is mentioned in a 980 account in the early-12th-century text Primary Chronicle, the oldest copy of which is part of the Laurentian Codex of 1377:

And Vladimir began to reign alone in Kyiv. And he placed idols on the hill outside the palace: a Perun in wood with a silver head and a gold moustache, and Khors Dazhbog, and Stribog, and Simargl, and Mokosh. And they offered sacrifices and called them gods, and they took their sons and daughters to them and sacrificed them to the devils. And they profaned the earth with their sacrifices, and Rus’ and that hill were profaned by blood.

In historiography, this event is known as the pagan reform or the first religious reform of Vladimir. One point of view, considering the reform, treats it as a transition to monotheism; according to philologist Viljo Mansikka, and historians Aleksey Shakhmatov and Henryk Łowmiański, initially there was only Perun in the Primary Chronicle, and later other gods were added to make Vladimir a polytheist. The philologist Anichkov shared Shahmatov's position, although he noted: "there is no objective data to recognize this insertion". Historian Evgeny Anichkov said the existence of the Kyiv pantheon is recorded in parallel sources.

It has been debated the text's passage about "bringing their sons and daughters" refers to either human sacrifice or participation in a ritual. Modern academics consider the text from "And they offered" to "and that hill", and beyond to be a paraphrase of Psalm verses (Psalm 106:35–44). Vasilyev considers the existence of frequent human sacrifices for the Kyiv pantheon as a historical fact, but according to historian Pavel Lukin, the issue of human sacrifices and the reform is debatable, and the text about Vladimir's reform is a reworking of the Chronicle of George Hamartolos, which mentions the creation of six idol gods of deities with Belphegor leading and one female figure, Astarte. According to the Chronicle, the idols were made of gold and silver, and defiled earth is also mentioned. Lukin said the story of Vladimir's pantheon and human sacrifices is a chronicler's construction from the 1170s, and the names of the deities were taken from oral tradition the chronicler knew of.

Among the deities established by Vladimir, Mokosh was the only goddess. Philologist Nikolay Zubov said: "according to the generally accepted opinion, in the circle of Vladimir's pantheon, this is the most mysterious figure".

After Vladimir baptized Rus in 988, he ordered the idols to be overthrown: some chopped up, others burned. He built St. Basil's Church on the spot where the idols stood. In 1975, the foundations of the building were found during excavations on Old Kyiv Mountain. Archaeologist Boris Rybakov recognized the structure as the site of Kyiv's pantheon, claiming that it had "clearly marked five projections of different sizes: one large one in the middle, two smaller ones on the sides and two very small ones near the side projections...". Subsequent researchers have criticized Rybakov's statement. The kapishche (outdoors temple) itself has not been discovered by archaeologists, nor has any evidence of human sacrifice in Kyiv.

After the adoption of Christianity, various sermons against the old religion appeared. In particular, the Sermon by One Who Loves Christ was written, according to most scholars, in the mid-11th century. The exceptions are Mansikka, who claims the Sermon was written in the 14th century, and Rusanova and Timoshchuk, who date it to the 12th century. The Sermon itself is available in two editions: a short, original edition and a long, later edition. Fragment from the late 14th century edition of the Paisios' list of the collection:

As Elijah the Tishbite, having cut the throats of three hundred idolatrous prophets and priests, said: “I burn with zeal for my Lord God Almighty”, so he, too being unable to bear Christians who live a double faith and believe in Perun and Khors, Mokosh, Sim and Rgl and in the Vily, who number thirty-nine sisters, —so say ignorant people who consider them goddesses—and thus give them offerings and cut the throats of hens and pray to fire, calling it Svarozhits. [...] Therefore, Christians must not hold demonic festivities, meaning dancing, music and profane songs, and offerings to the idols, who with fire under the fields of sheaves pray to the Vily, to Mokosh, and Sim and Rgl, to Perun, Rod, the Rozhanitsy and all the like.

– Sermon by One Who Loves Christ and Is a Jealous Defender of the Righteous Faith

Slavist Nikolay Galkovsky, due to the fact that the vilas are noted next to Mokosh, believes that they are related to the goddess, but according to historian Igor Danilevsky, the author of the Word used some unknown South Slavic source from which he took information about the vilas, mythological figures of the South Slavs. In his opinion, the Eastern Slavs themselves did not worship vilas. Similarly, Mansikka believes that the vilas and Mokosh were taken from the text Vopros, chto yest' trebokladen'ye idol'skoye, which he considers South Slavic. According to Anichkov, the original version of the Sermon said nothing about deities and they were added by later editors. Anichkov's opinion is shared by Mansikka, who believes that the list of deities comes from the Primary Chronicle. On this basis, historian Vladimir Petukhin concludes that the insert with the mention of deities appeared no earlier than the 12th century. Since the name Simargl is spelled as Sim and Regl, the author of the Word may not have understood which characters were being referred to.

Mokosh is mentioned in the Old Rus' work Sermon by Saint Gregory, which is a reworking of the 4th century teaching of Constantinople patriarch Gregory of Nazianzus. The unknown Old Rus' author used the condemnation of the Greek gods, supplementing it with a text condemning the Slavic gods. An early edition of the Sermon is preserved in three handwritten copies from the 15th century and is variously dated by different researchers: the 1060s (Anichkov), the 12th century (Łowmiański, Rybakov), as well as dates considered unlikely by Vasilyev: late 13th - early 14th century (Slavists Sreznevsky, Galkovsky), 14th century (Mansikka). According to Rybakov, Sermon by Saint Gregory was a direct translation, but Danilevsky points out that the Word only partially reflects the Greek original. The original is called On the Theophany. Danilevsky notes that it is not known exactly which variant of Gregory Nazianzin's text was used by the Old Russian author himself. It is also unknown how reliable the information about Slavic gods contained in the Sermon is. Excerpt from the Novgorod Sophia Library manuscript No. 1295 from the 15th century:

To those gods the Slavic people makes offerings too, and to vily, and Mokosh, Diva, Perun, Khors, Rod and Rozhanitsy, to the vampires and to the beregyni, and to Pereplut, for whom they drink in horns while pouring around. [...] The Taurian sacrifices made by the first born sons to the idols, the sacrificial blood of the Laconians spilt from wounds, which is their punishment, and with which they bathed the goddess, Yecate, whom they considered a virgin. And they worship Mokosh, and Kyla, and Malakiya, that is masturbation, saying: Buyakini. [...] Following holy baptism, they rejected Perun, but even after accepting Christ, in the border areas they still pray to the accursed Perun, and to Khors, and Mokosh and vil. And they do it secretly...

– Sermon by Saint Gregory, Found in the Comments, on How the Ancient Nations, When Pagan, Worshipped Idols and Offered Sacrifices to Them, and Continue to Do So Now

Mansikka notes that the meaning of the word Diva is unknown. Perhaps it is a literal translation of the Greek Δἰος (Dios), or the text should be read as Mokosh-Deva ("Mokosh-Virgin"). According to Danilevsky, what was meant was the [masculine] Div. Zubov comments that there is also an opinion that considers Diva to be the feminine version of Div, but analyzing the text, he concludes that the more correct variant is Mokosh-Deva, despite the original Дивѣ (Divě (dat)), instead of the expected *Дѣвѣ (*Děvě (dat)). The scholar attributes this to the Novgorodian origin of Sermon and the fact that in the dialect the sound [ѣ] can turn into [i]. Thus, the term "Diva" becomes an epithet-definition of Mokosh "according to the Hellenistic model", regardless of whether Mokosh was a virgin in the original pagan depictions. In favor of this interpretation, according to the scholar, is the fact that the word Diva is not mentioned anywhere else. Rybakov and Zubov define Yecate as Hekate, believing that the author of the Sermon saw some parallels between Hekate and Mokosh. The term malakiya is of Greek origin and means onanism. From its proximity to Mokosh, Ilyinsky concludes that Mokosh was associated with sexual activity.

Slavist Aleksander Brückner rejected the identification of Mokosh with malakiya, as the text shows that they are two different things. According to Mansikka, "and they worship Mokosh, and Kyla" is an insertion made on the basis of the consonance of Mokosh with malakiya. Danilevsky literally translates the word Kyla as "hernia", but he himself believes, as do many other scholars, that it is more likely to be considered a distortion of the word vila. Galkovsky viewed buyakini as a vila, which he associated with Mokosh. The term buyakini is associated by Leo Klejn with the words buy, buyvishche, meaning "pogost", "cemetery", and the buyakini themselves, if not a copyist's error, are understood by Klejn as participants in funeral rites who practiced orgiastic rituals. In Klejn's reconstruction, Perun was a dying-and-rising god, and these rituals were a sacred drama of resurrecting a dead god or his reincarnation, and the purpose of the buyakini was not onanism, but the extraction of semen for ritual purposes. Danilevsky points out, however, that the Greek original says "in honor of bliss and fearlessness", where the latter word was translated as buyestʹ "courage", and the form buyakini appeared only as a result of consonance (in relation to malakini). Anichkov believes that the text consists of late insertions.

The philologist Nikolai Tikhonravov, in the fourth volume of Chronicles of Russian Literature and Antiquity, cites the text Vopros, chto yest' trebokladen'ye idol'skoye in Moscow synodal manuscript No. 954 from the 14th century, fol. 33; Galkovsky did not find this text and concluded that either Tikhonravov was mistaken or the manuscript numbers had been changed. Excerpt:

He is not speaking to pagans, but to peasants. Many Christians set meals for idols and fill cups for demons. Who are these idols? The first idol is the rozhanitsa. The great prophet Isaiah speaks of them, crying out in a loud voice: Oh, woe to those who set a meal for the rozhanitsa and fill cups for the demons! The other [meal] is given to the vilas and Mokosh, and they do not pray openly, but secretly call on idolatrous women; and not only poor people, but also the wives of rich husbands. Using the troparion of the holy Theotokos during an idolatrous meal is very bad.

– Vopros, chto yest' trebokladen'ye idol'skoye

Linguists Vladimir Toporov and Vyacheslav Ivanov distinguish the category of idol worshippers as the priestesses of Mokosh, but in turn Zubov concludes: the text is a reference to the Sermon of Isaiah, and the vilas and Mokosh are a contemporaneous insertion close to Sermon by Saint Gregory.

The work Sermon by the Holy Father Saint John Chrysostom is a compilation and is based specifically on Sermon by Saint Gregory. Generally, the text dates to the 13th century, and historian Igor Danilevsky dates it to the end of the 11th century, and is known from the manuscript from St. Sophia Cathedral of Veliky Novgorod No. 1262 from the 14th-15th centuries and other copies. Excerpt according to the oldest of these:

Men who have forgotten the fear of God from neglect by renouncing baptism, approach idols and start to make sacrifices to the thunder and lightning, the sun and moon, and others, to Perun, Khors, the vily and Mokosh, to vampires and the beregyni, whom they call three times nine sisters. And others believe in Svarozhits and Artemid, to whom ignorant men pray. They sacrifice cockerels to them.

– Sermon by the Holy Father Saint John Chrysostom, Archbishop of Constantinople, on How the First Pagans Believed in Idols

In the Life of Vladimir preserved in the Bulgarian oldest copy from the 13th century, after the story of Vladimir's baptism in Kherson, it is said: "And he came to Kyiv, beating the idols of Perun, Khurs, Dazhbog and Mokosh and other idols". The work goes back to Primary Chronicle.

In the Hypatian Codex, under the date 1071, we read that “at the same time” a volkhv appeared in Kyiv to whom five deities appeared. He claimed that within five years the Dnieper would begin to flow backwards, and the Rus' land would "pass" into the hands of the Greeks. Scholars equated these deities with the Kyiv pantheon, in which they believed there were six. Explaining this contradiction, Anichkov excluded Mokosh from this list, as he considered her a borrowed deity. Łowmiański also excluded Mokosh because he was of the opinion that she was originally a demon and was added later to the Vladimir pantheon, while Rybakov rejected Simargl. Vasilyev explains this by the fact that Dazhbog bore the double name of Dazhbog-Khors. However, Petrukhin believes that the prophecy of the volkhv in Kyiv is not due to traces of paganism, but events in 1068-1069, when rebellious peasants threatened the princes to burn the city and go to the land of Greece. "Five gods" were the five planets whose astrological position and referred to by the magician.

An annalistic edition of The Tale of the Battle with Mamai, written perhaps in the early 15th century, describes Mamai's defeat: "The impious ... King Mamai, seeing his destruction, began to call upon his gods: Perun, Salavat, Mokosh and Gursa". Here the form of Mokosh's name is given in the masculine gender. In the main and most widely circulated editions of the Tale, the god Mokosh is absent. Vasilyev notes that the list of gods is most similar to their list in the Sermon by the Holy Father Saint John Chrysostom.

=== Sources from the 16th-17th centuries ===
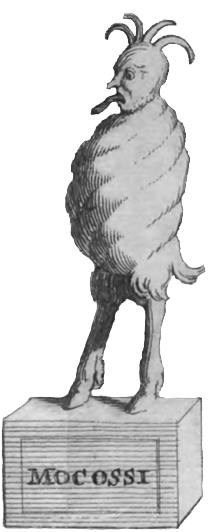
Christian propagandistic depiction of Mokosh, Georg A. Schleissing, La Religion ancienne et moderne des Moscovites, 1698

There are Polish chronicles relating to East Slavic paganism and mentioning Mokosh, but researchers consider them secondary, as they are based on Old East Slavic sources. In the 16th-century work De origine et rebus gestis Polonorum libri XXX by historian Martin Kromer, Mokosh is mentioned among other gods as Mocosi. In the Chronicle of the historian Maciej Stryjkowski, published in 1582, in a list of gods whose names are passed down in distorted form, Mokosh is noted as Makosz. Mansikka notes that the chronicle itself was compiled from other Polish sources and contains "some fantasies and fabrications".

According to one of the confessional questions in the 16th century Rule of Saint Sava, the priest had to ask: "Have you wandered with impious women and prayed to the vilas, and Rod, and the rozhanitsy, and Perun, Khors, Mokosh, and drank and ate?". Three years of penance with bowing was imposed for the aforementioned sin. According to Anichkov, the mention of Perun, Chors and Mokosh was added as an insertion. The same question was included in the work K posledovaniyu i ispovedaniyu knyazem, boyaram i vsem pravoslavnym khristianam dukhovnym ottsom from the early 16th century, where two years of penance were imposed for a positive answer to this question. The 16th century Khudom nomokanuntse asks: “Did you go to Mokusha?". Many researchers believe that the term Mokusha as used in this context means, not the goddess, but "witch doctor". Akhnikov explained it with the word mokshitʹ "to beg, to whine", changed to "to enchant", "to conjure". According to ethnographer Elpidifor Barsov, in the Khudom sel'skom nomokanuntse he possessed, the question was: "Did you go to Mokosha?". Shakhmatov refers to an unpublished Word on the Beginning of the Rus' Land in the 16th century inventory of the Rumyantsev Museum No. 358, where the sentence "and Prince Vladimir came to crush the idols of Mokosh and others" is found.

A work from a collection dating back to the 16th century, which publisher Izmail Sreznevsky calls The Spiritual Instruction of Children, and historian Dmitri Schoeppingk calls Sermon of Saint John Chrysostom, contains the following instruction:

Hide yourselves from God invisible, people praying to the lineage and rodzanice, Perun and Apollo, and Mokosha and peregynia, and do not approach any god, nor any vile sacrifices.

Mansikka believes that the names of mythological figures come from a certain work condemning pagans, close to the Sermon by Saint Gregory.

The chapter On the idols of Vladimir from the Piskari manuscript No. 153 of the late 17th century lists the statues installed by Vladimir. This work is not original and ancient, as it was based on the chapter On the idols from the Kievan Synopsis, probably created by the historian Innocent Gizel. The chapter On the idols of Vladimir is similar in content to the text On the idols of Rus' in the Hustyn Chronicle of 1670. Both chapters were written under the influence of Polish chronicles and contain the names of the gods in a distorted form. Excerpt from Piskari manuscript no. 153:

Also other idols were many, by name Outlad or Oslad, Korsh or Khors, Dashub or Dazhb, Strib or Stribog, Simargl or Simurgl, and Makosh or Mokosh; to them, to the demons, the ignorant people, like to a God, offered sacrifices and praises. This abomination prevailed throughout the state of Vladimir.

The Hustyn Chronicle similarly lists the gods, including Mokosh. Mansikka writes that these chronicles are more detailed than the original, and notes that the scribe chose to supplement them with his own notes and insertions. All three works eventually return to Primary Chronicle.

The Sermon from the Holy Gospel in manuscript No. 784 from the Trinity Lavra of St. Sergius lists sins of the body and soul. Among the sins of the soul are mentioned:

[To] learn astronomy and believe in casting [spells] and in false writings, and in Hellenistic books, and in fairy tales, and in ustryatsu, and in Mokosh, and in snosudets, divination by birds, in thunder and in kolyada, and in all the martoloi and damned who make evil days and hours.

There is a variant where in place of Mokosh is the word basket kosh "fate", according to Rybakov the word Mokosh instead of kosh was just a scribe's error, and he translates the words snosudets, ustryatsu and martoloi as "volkhovnik", "divination" and "astrologers", respectively. Anichkov considered the words ustryatsu and Mokosh to be insertions.

In the Ukrainian Life of Vladimir of the 17th century among the list of his gods Mokosh is recorded as Moksha. In the Ukrainian Prologue Life of Vladimir from the manuscript of the Rumyantsev Museum No. 325 of the 17th century tells how Vladimir beat his gods, among them the deity Moksha, and drowned them in the Dnieper. This work, like Life of Vladimir, goes back to the Primary Chronicle.

== Attempts at reconstruction ==
According to the Slavist Grigoriy Ilyinsky, ancient Rus' sources do not provide any information except the name of Mokosh. In his opinion, toponymic traces are equally unreliable and explanatory, and some conclusions about the nature of the goddess can only be drawn on the basis of folklore and ethnographic evidence. Later, philologist Aleksandr Strakhov wrote the features of Mokosh, like the rest of the pagan pantheon, are known "not from medieval sources, but from numerous reconstructions and observations of scholars and belletrists of the 19th and 20th centuries".

=== Early studies ===
In early scholarly literature, Mokosh was considered in various ways: Slavist Pyotr Preys compared Mokosh with Astarte, and the Slavist Lubor Niederle likened her to Aphrodite. Ethnographer M. Nikiforovsky considered her the goddess of winds and water. According to historian Dmitri Schoeppingk, Mokosh's functions were transferred to Saint Elijah because he is called "wet". Slavist Nikolai Galkovsky assumed because Mokosh is mentioned together with the vilas that according to him are called buyakini in the Sermon by Saint Gregory, Mokosh was the spirit of the deceased residing in water. Archaeologist Aleksandr Velikhanov, referring to Sanskrit, said Mokosh and Simargl were the same deity. Slavist Vatroslav Jagić did not consider Mokosh a deity at all. Folklorist Alexander Krappe likened Mokosh to the biblical Moloch. In History of Russia, historian Vasily Tatishchev stated: "Mokos, the god of cattle". Galkovsky said the Czechs had a rain and moisture deity with a similar name, to whom they offered prayers and sacrifices in times of severe drought. Archaeologist Boris Rybakov noted Galkovsky does not refer to the source of this information. In 1839, ethnographer Żegota Pauli said the Czechs and Moravians had a deity called Makosla, Makosh, Mokosh, which they worshipped in times of drought. He compared this deity to Mokosh, while referring to it as Mokta or Moksha, and considered them the same rain deity.

=== Mokosh and Mokosha, Mokusha ===
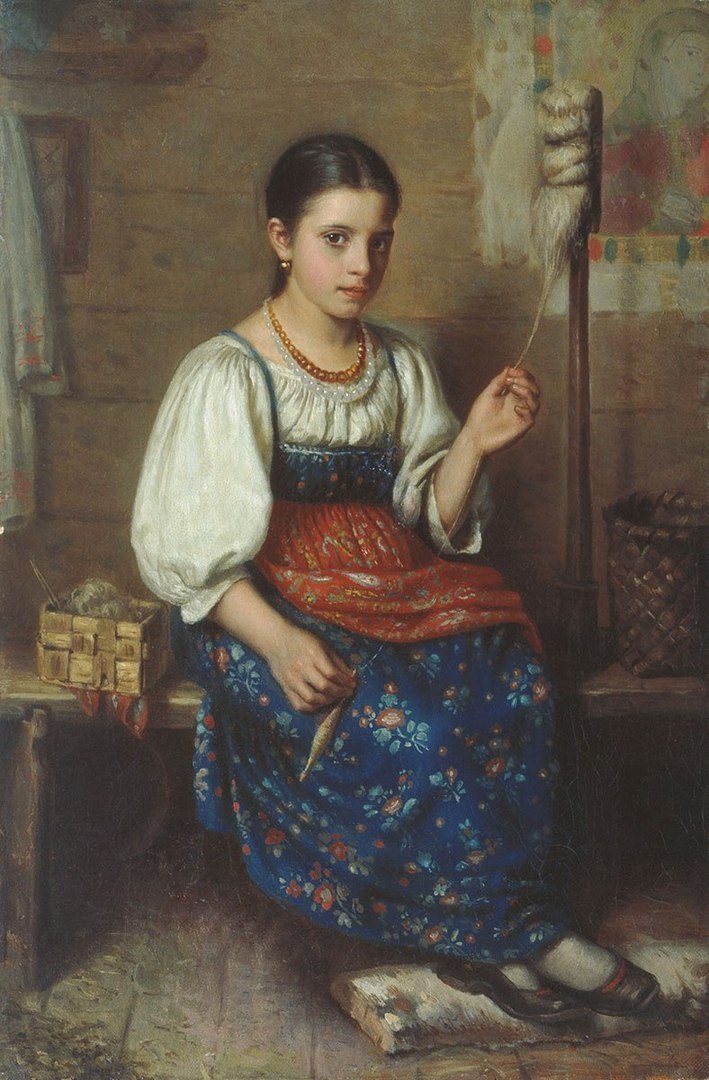
Spinner. Portrait of the Russian painter Nikolay Dubovskoy, 1870

Various reconstructions of the function of the goddess have been carried out using ethnographic data. At the end of the 19th century, in the journal "Zhivaya starina", ethnographer Mikhail Gerasimov published ethnographic data from the Cherepovetsky Uyezd, which noted the villagers beliefs about a demon and domovoy by the name of Mokoshá. Later, Gerasimov said Mokosha was not a domovoy. She lives in every hut in the babiy kut and is imagined as a woman with a big head and long arms. Mokosha likes to spin sliver at night, left by women without prayer. That is why there is a prohibition in the village of Bolshoy Dvor in Dmitrovsky District: "Don't leave your linen, or Mokosha will spin it". Ethnographer Elpidifor Barsov provided information from the Olonets Governorate about the belief in a spirit called Mókusha, who during Great Lent goes among the people spinning wool at night and shearing sheep.

When unsheared sheep scrape out their excess wool, (Note: It's probably all about the moulting) it was said: "Oh, Mokusha has sheared the sheep". When they sleep and the spindle "whirrs", it is said: "Mokusha spun". When Mokusha leaves the house, she might slam the spindle into bunk and beam. The offering to her was a piece of wool left in the shears for the night. If Mokusha is not satisfied, she can cut off some of the housewives' hair. This image of an impure force corresponds to the kikimora, whose depictions are widespread, mainly in northern Russia, and who is sometimes understood as a domovoy. She is described as an ugly woman who mostly lives the home. She uses objects to make sounds and acts at night when people are sleeping. She is deterred by prayer. The kikimora's main occupation is harming householders and spinning. Mokusha can shear sheep, but she does it poorly and can be appeased with a special sacrifice. Many other mythological figures of folk Christianity are associated with spinning: Saint Barbara, Theotokos, Paraskeva Friday, notsnitsa and rusalka. A rusalka could be called мókush; demons could be called mokosh or mokush. In the Yaroslavl Governorate, an "economic, troublesome man" could be referred to as a mokoshá, while in the Vyatka Governorate a "hardworking person" was called a shishimory. Kikimora was also known in Novgorod and Vologda Governorate as mokrukha because she left a wet mark at the spinning site.

Based on the consonance of the names, Gerasimov and Barsov said Mokosh, Mokosha and Mokusha are identical. This proposal was supported by a number of other researchers, who attributed several functions—love, birth, connection with the night, spinning, raising sheep and the feminine sphere— Among them were linguist Max Vasmer and historian Leo Klejn. Barsov believed Mokosh was associated with sheep farming, wool, yarn, female braids and the feminine sphere in general, and that she was a companion of Veles. According to Ilyinsky, Mokosh is the goddess of spinning, weaving and other household chores, and the patroness of matchmaking, marriage and sexual relations, "weaving" meaning bringing lovers together. Historian and philologist Michal Téra recognized her as the Earth Mother, who patronized women and was a Slavic variant of the “Indo-European trifunctional goddess.” Linguist Vladimir Toporov, in an attempt to explain the resemblance to kikimora, said there was a demonization of the goddess, which reduced Mokosh to the level of kikimora.

Philologist Nikolai Zubov brought Mokosh and kikimora closer together through the second element in the latter's name: -mora, which he said originated from the Proto-Slavic stem *mor- and can mean "swamp, standing water". Through the functions of spinning and fate, a connection has been suggested with similar deities: the Germanic Norns, the Greek Moirai and the Baltic goddess Laima. Zubov suggested a connection between Mokosh and the moon because in European folklore, the moon can be associated with spinning and procreation. According to him, long-armedness is associated with the epithet "long-armed" of Iranian gods and rulers, prince Yuri Dolgorukiy and the princes of Chernigov, who may have borne this nickname. Marina Vlasova suggests a connection between Mokosh and the rusalkas and the Theotokos, although she noted: "it is difficult to characterize with sufficient precision the relationship between the images of Mokosh and Mokosha spinning at home".

Historian Henryk Łowmiański and linguist Stanisław Urbańczyk made the opposite reconstruction, believing Mokosh was originally a demon in the 10th-11th centuries, and Nikon of Caves included her in the annalistic pantheon of Primary Chronicle as an insert due to the lack of information about the real gods. In keeping with Łowmiański's idea, Nikon included the names of the deities surrounding him in Tmutarakan, and the name of Mokosh, who in Slavic lands was "held in great esteem as a demon". According to the historian Vladimir Petrukhin, Tmutarakan was not a source of pagan syncretism, remaining a Greek and Christian city.

According to philologist Evgeny Anichkov, the name Mokoshá is of Finno-Ugric origin. The name Mokoshá, according to linguists Toporov and Ivanov, may be a deverbal formation from the Proto-Slavic *mok-oši-ti, which they understood to mean "to bustle, to potter, to putter", but this hypothesis has not been supported and the word probably has a later Russian origin.

Although many scholars have linked etymological and ethnographic reconstructions, later researchers have noted that they do not relate to each other in any way. Łowmiański criticized that because the function of spinning could not be the main one.

==== Łuczyński's reconstruction ====
Based on information about "going to Mokosh" as an oracle or fortune teller, Łuczyński interpreted Mokosh as the goddess of fate and destiny; this interpretation was confirmed by dialect dictionaries, which often record the phrase "to go to [an oracle]". According to Łuczyński: "God is not Mokosh, [he] consoles with something", as an antithesis, i.e. Mokosh is the one who "consoles", gives luck, good fortune. She was also supposed to rule the weather, such as rain, as an extension of her rulership over fate. The depiction of Mokosh in dialects of Russia, including the vocabulary of the Old Believers, reflects the goddess' association with birth and the determination of fate of newborns. Mokosh was also associated with the household and feminine activities; she was patron of women, probably married women in particular, as indicated by the fact married women were "visiting" Mokosh, which could express the psychosocial context of the worship of this goddess. Based on the above characteristics, Łuczyński concluded the closest counterpart to Mokosh is the Baltic Laima, who was associated with water and fate—when Laima was on a hill, she foretold good fate; when she was in the marshes, by the water, she foretold bad fate. Latvian toponyms include the hydronyms Lainuma-zers ("Laima's lake"), lainuma-purvs ("Laima's swamp"), divination (the Rambynas stone that was used to foretell the future was Laima's "house"), and the birth of children and determining their fate. Unlike Laima, Mokosh did not have patronage of agriculture.

=== Comparison with Paraskeva Friday ===
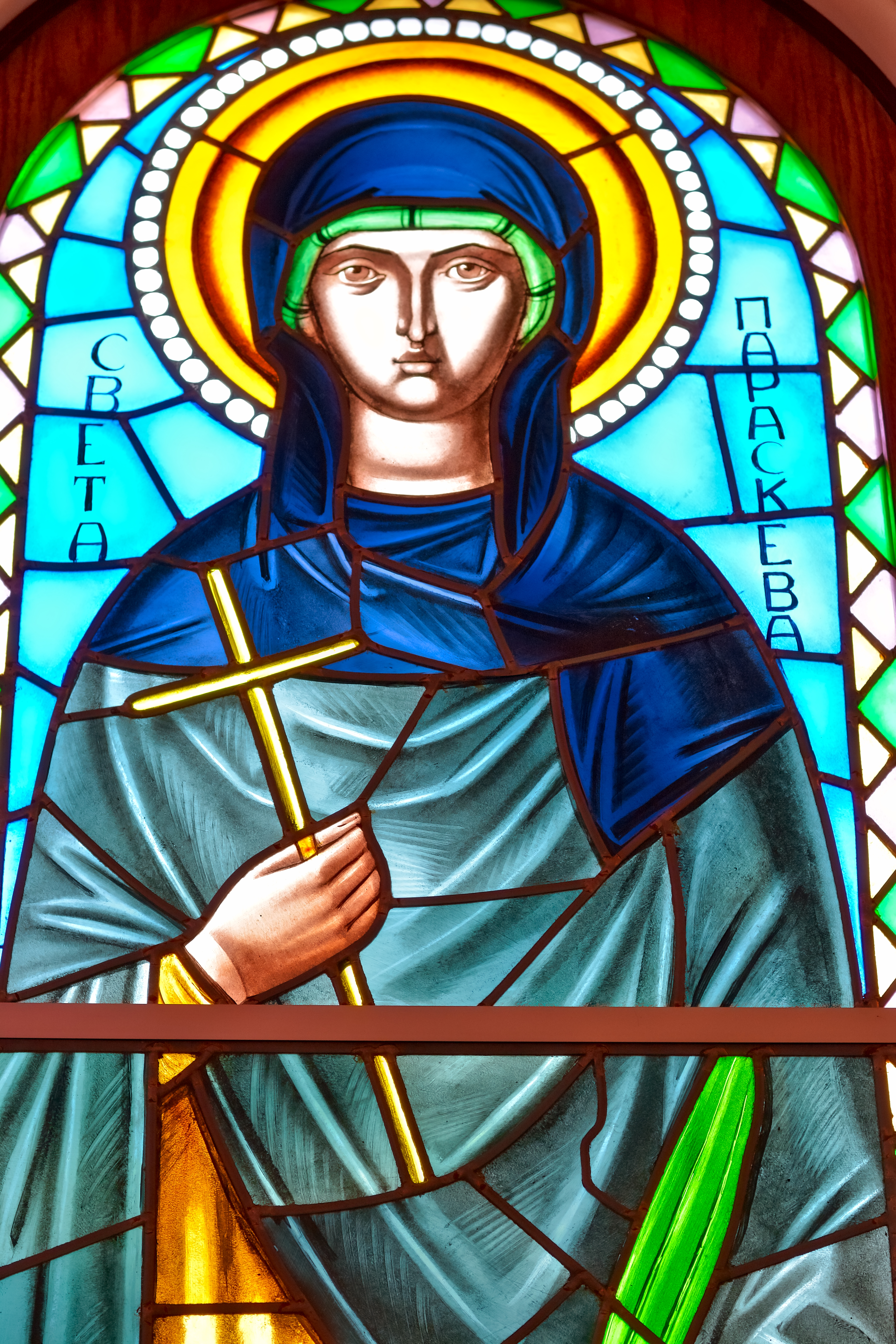
According to an outdated reconstruction, the cult of Mokosh was reflected in the Christian cult of Paraskeva Friday. A stained glass window of Paraskeva of the Balkans from Church of Saint George in Smederevo

It was later suggested Mokosh was related to Paraskeva Friday (Russian: Paraskeva Pyatnitsa); Friday and Wednesday were associated with the Passion of Jesus, and were accompanied by fasting and folk Christian bans on work, especially women's work, such as spinning, sewing, washing, and dishwashing. There were also bans on children and sexual activity. The ban on spinning extended to Sunday and Friday, which was called "bloody day" in Polesia and was widely considered an unlucky time. In folk Christianity, Pyatnitsa was personified as a mythical female figure. The same was true of Wednesday and Sunday. These personifications had the same functions as the Pyatnitsa. The prohibitions were motivated by a number of considerations related to the threat of harm to the spinner, her family, and her dead ancestors. For example, according to beliefs recorded in Polesia, Pyatnitsa in the form of a woman with loose hair would torture whoever broke the ban by suffocating them in their sleep. According to another belief, in the "next world", spindles will enter the mouth and eyes. A ban on spinning on Tuesday, Thursday, and Saturday has also been reported elsewhere.

The mythological Friday has been correlated with Paraskeva Pyatnitsa, whose cult developed from that of the saints Paraskeva of Iconium and Paraskeva of the Balkans, whose names from Byzantine Greek Paraskeuḗ translate as "Friday". In addition to Friday's prohibitions and injunctions, and its association with spinning, Paraskeva was associated with marriage, childbearing, curing diseases and water springs, because of which she was called the "mother of earth and water". There are legends of an icon of Paraskeva appearing in a spring, after which the spring became healing. Sacrifices were made to Paraskeva by throwing coins, ribbons, shirts, handkerchiefs, towels or sheep's wool and thread into water on Elijah's Friday. These items could be thrown directly into the water or left next to the inscription "for mother Pyatnica for the apron!". In Ukraine in the 19th century, the Mokrid ritual was recorded, during which a tether was thrown into a well. In this ritual, Pyatnitsa was represented by a woman with loose hair. The saint was closely associated with wells, on which her icons could be placed.

There is a widespread view among researchers that Paraskeva Pyatnitsa replaced Mokosh in Christian times, which is why Vladimir Toporov believed Mokosh was popular among women following Christianization. Friday itself began to be understood as the day of the goddess Mokosh based on the dedication of this day to Venus by the Romans and Frigg by the Germans. Researcher and historian Eve Levin noted this approximation does not stand up to criticism because elements of the Paraskeva cult have Christian origins rather than pagan ones, and the cult is known in Serbia, Bulgaria, Greece and, Romania, whereas Mokosh is known only from East Slavic sources. The earliest East Slavic sources speak of Paraskeva as the patron of merchants rather than women. The basis of Paraskeva's association with spinning were parables depicting her as a maiden. In them, she strikes blind her tormentor then heals him, making her the patroness of those suffering from eye diseases. In the 14th and 15th centuries, Paraskeva's relics rested in Ternovo and Belgrade, where local water sources were linked to her. The only function that has no obvious Christian origin is the patronage of childbirth, but according to Levin, this is a natural development of the patronization of women's labor and healing. The Eastern Orthodox Church supported the cult of Paraskeva, although it considered its folk interpretation "heretical", saying on Wednesday and Friday, one was not supposed to stop working but only fast and refrain from sex. The correspondence between Mokosh and Paraskeva is also rejected by philologists Aleksandr Strakhov and Aleksandr Panchenko. Historian Leo Klejn, criticizing the concept of Thursday as Perun's day, said the Slavs borrowed the seven-day week from the Romans and Byzantines, who in turn borrowed it from the Near East, naming the days of the week after the planets and gods dedicated to them by distance in the Ptolemaic system, whereby Friday, which is dedicated to Venus, was the seventh day. Germanic peoples later borrowed and interpreted the names of the week's days. The qualities of Paraskeva, Venus, and Freya are opposite; Paraskeva patronizes proper female behavior rather than sexual activity.

==== The theory of basic myth ====
Linguists Vladimir Toporov and Vyacheslav Ivanov created the basic myth theory, which reconstructed the Proto-Slavic myth of a battle between a storm god and a chthonic serpent. The first deity was correlated with Perun, the second with Veles, and there was also a female figure. Toporov said Mokosh was a Proto-Slavic deity and correlates this figure with her. The kidnapping of cattle, people or Perun's wife by Veles caused enmity between the gods; after Veles is defeated with an arrow, abundant rain falls on the earth. According to Toporov, Mokosh is Perun's wife because Perun opens the list of gods and Mokosh closes it. He points to a connection between Thursday as the even day dedicated to Perun/Veles and the odd day, Friday, as dedicated to Mokosh. In a 19th-century Ukrainian intimate song, there is a reference to the relationship between Mokosh and Pokhvist, whom Toporov understands as Perun, who was associated with wind. Toporov and Ivanov supported Teodolius Witkowski's assumption the toponyms Muukus and Prohn in the same circle and correlated with Mokosh and Perun, respectively, speak of the relationship between the deities. Comparisons between the toponyms Peryn and Mokošin Vrch, both of which mean an elevated place, have been made. The Baltic toponyms Perkuno kalnas ("mountain of Perkun") and Laumes kalnas ("mountain of Laima"), and Laume dauba ("ravine of Laima") have been compared with the Belarusian Mokoshino boloto.

By identifying the prophet Elijah with Perun, they point to the existence in folk beliefs of the prophet's companion, Saint Macrina, who was associated with moisture and ultimately with Mokosh. To prove Mokosh's promiscuity, Toporov cites several parallels; the association of Paraskeva Pyatnitsa with Mokosh is linked with Mokosh's promiscuity because Paraskeva could be depicted with loose hair. He correlated the term mokosya meaning an evil woman with Mokosh. One of the sermons against paganism mentions Mokosh, and there is an earlier question about debauchery with ungodly women. Friday's prohibitions correlate with a motif of a woman who lost her children as a result of violating the prohibitions, particularly that of using "fire", a decoction of ashes. In Baltic mythology is a myth of a celestial wedding, according to which the goddess of the morning star Aušrinė is an adulterer. Toporov reconstructs the relationship between Mokosh and Veles: Thursday, in his view, was also the day of Veles and is correlated with Friday. Mokosh shares with Veles a common connections to water, wool, and the pit motif. Based on this, Toporov reconstructed the myth of Mokosh's adultery with Veles and Perun's subsequent punishment of her children. For the betrayal, Perun punishes Mokosh's children with fire because Mokosh's element water does not frighten her. According to Toporov, it is possible the cult of Mokosh may have enjoyed special reverence in Moscow based on the semantics of the toponym and theonym of Mokosh, and because Moscow is mentioned for the first time in the chronicles in connection with a meeting of the princes on Friday, April 4. It has been proposed to identify Mokosh with Baba Yaga and the goddess Laima through her function as a maiden.

Leo Klein considers this theory to be a stretch and based on speculation, and disputes the idea Thursday and Friday were dedicated to gods. Later research has rejected any link between Mokosh and Paraskeva. Henryk Łowmiański said the proximity of Perun and Mokosh is due to a literary connection and has no evidentiary value. The "Ukrainian intimate song" from the 19th century cited by Toporov is The Tale of the God Pokhvist, on the basis of which an opinion "the memory of Mokosh in Ukraine was preserved until the middle of the 19th century" has arisen in academia. The 19th-century scholars Mykola Kostomarov and Alexander Pypin refused to acknowledge the text's authenticity. Philologist Andrei Toporkov considers the work to be a forgery created by the writer Oleksandr Shyshats’kyy-Illich. The religious academic Andrey Beskov commented Ivanov and Toporov showed "surprising credulity" in believing in the authenticity of the text. The hypothesis of Mokosh's marriage to Perun, like the theory of the main myt, has not found full support in the scientific community. Historian Roman Rabinovich wrote Mokosh's features rather testify to a possible marriage with Veles.

==== Rybakov's reconstruction ====
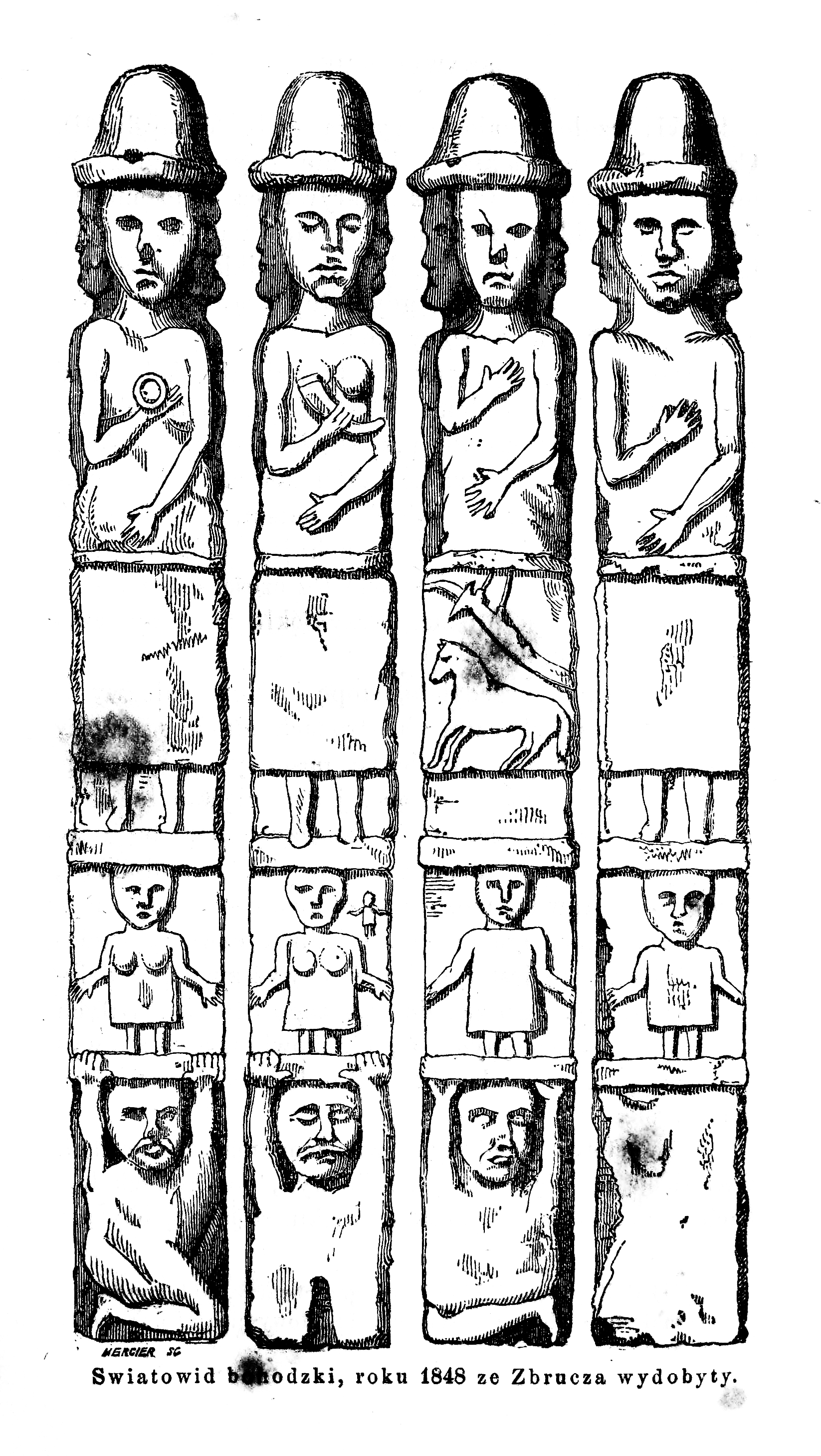
According to Rybakov's interpretation, the Zbruch idol allegedly depicts Mokosh with a horn in her hand. An 1853 drawing of the idol from Joachim Lelewel's book

Archaeologist Boris Rybakov, who supported the reconstruction of Mokosh through identification with Paraskeva and her etymology, which is false, deduced Mokosh's name translates as "Mother of Fate, Good Harvest", characterizing her as a virgin goddess, goddess of fertility, water, patroness of women's labor and virgin fate. He considers Mokosh identical to the West Slavic goddess Zhiva and to Mat Zemlya, and correlates Mokosh with the image of the Paleolithic Mother Goddess, saying the cult of Mokosh originated in the Paleolithic era. On the basis of the Christian apocrypha On Twelve Fridays, Rybakov said every Friday was a celebration of Mokosh; there were twelve special Fridays of the year, the most important of which fell on November 1–8.

Analyzing Sermon by Saint Gregory, Rybakov wrote the author equated Mokosh with the goddess Yecate, identifying the latter as Hekate. He said the approximation occurred on the basis Hekate was understood to be a deity associated with the afterlife and was surrounded by dogs, whereas in the sources, Mokosh is adjacent to Simargl and the oxen, which Rybakov interpreted as a sacred dog associated with crops and rusalky (the souls of the dead). From this, he deduced the cult of Mokosh corresponded to the "middle phase of the cult of Hekate", which was agrarian.

Rybakov believed the Zbruch idol depicted Mokosh with a horn in her hand, which in his opinion is a symbol of abundance associated with fertility. According to Leon Klejn, the female figure below Mokosh in the middle row should be connected to the image above. Above her shoulder is a small figure, which Klejn interprets as a child, spirit or soul, and on this basis concludes this spirit is not related to the functions of the goddess according to Rybakov.

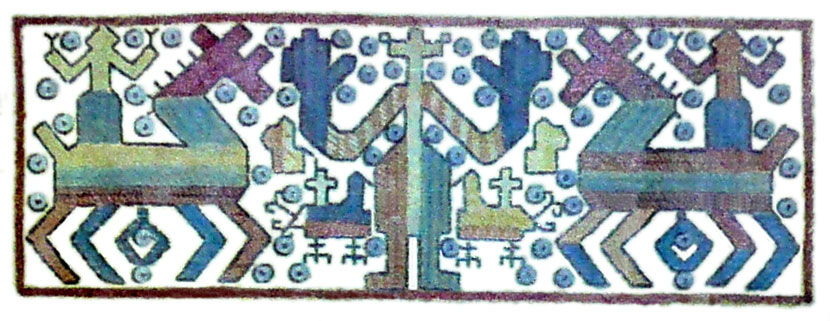
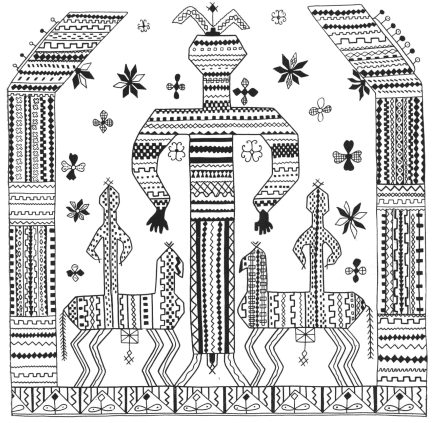
According to Rybakov, Russian embroideries from the 19th century allegedly depicted Mokosh in the center along with the horseman goddesses Lada and Lelya

Embroideries of Finno-Ugric peoples (Vepsians, Karelians, Izhorians), and Russian Northerners depict anthropomorphic figures with raised or partially lowered arms, combined with geometrized trees, birds, horses and horsemen. Sometimes, the human figures are framed by elements resembling buildings. Rybakov supported archaeologist Lev Dinces' conjecture the figure between the horses on these North Russian embroideries represents Mokosh. Rybakov interprets the structures depicted on the embroideries as pagan temples. Ethnographer Grigory Bazlov noted the existence of other embroideries in which, in his opinion, the central figures have beards and wear what Rybakov thought to be a dress, which Bazlov interpreted as a kaftan, concluding the central figures were men and that some of the figures have male genitalia. Folklorist Natalya Kozlova wrote there are only two examples with a male figure, and rejected the opinion of male genitalia because "the style of embroidery is conventional and schematic", and therefore "does not give grounds for accurate attribution of details". According to Klejn, the figure in the center represents the Sun and he rejects Rybakov's proposed character identifications.

=== Family ===
The sources make no mention of Mokosh's family connections. According to Vladimir Toporow, Mokosh was the wife of Perun. According to the theory of basic myth created by Toporow and Vyacheslav Ivanov, Mokosh cheated on Perun with Veles and was later punished by him. Later academics reject that myth. Łuczyński, who also rejects the Slavic version of the basic myth proposed by Toporov, also links Mokosh to Perun. For the hypothetical early Proto-Slavic pantheon, he reconstructs Proto-Mokosh as the daughter of Zema (Earth) and Div (Heaven), sister of Usa (Dawn), Proto-Yarilo (Morning Star), Men (Moon) and Sul (Sun). For the later stage, he reconstructs Mokosh as the wife of Perun, both of whom parented Morana and Yarilo. Witkowski, on the basis the villages of Prohn and Mukus, the names of which are supposed derived from Perun and Mokosh, were 2 kilometres (1.2 mi) from each other, concluded the villages "must indicate cult connections". According to the historian Roman Rabinovich, Mokosh's features are evidence of a possible marriage to Veles.

== Neopaganism ==
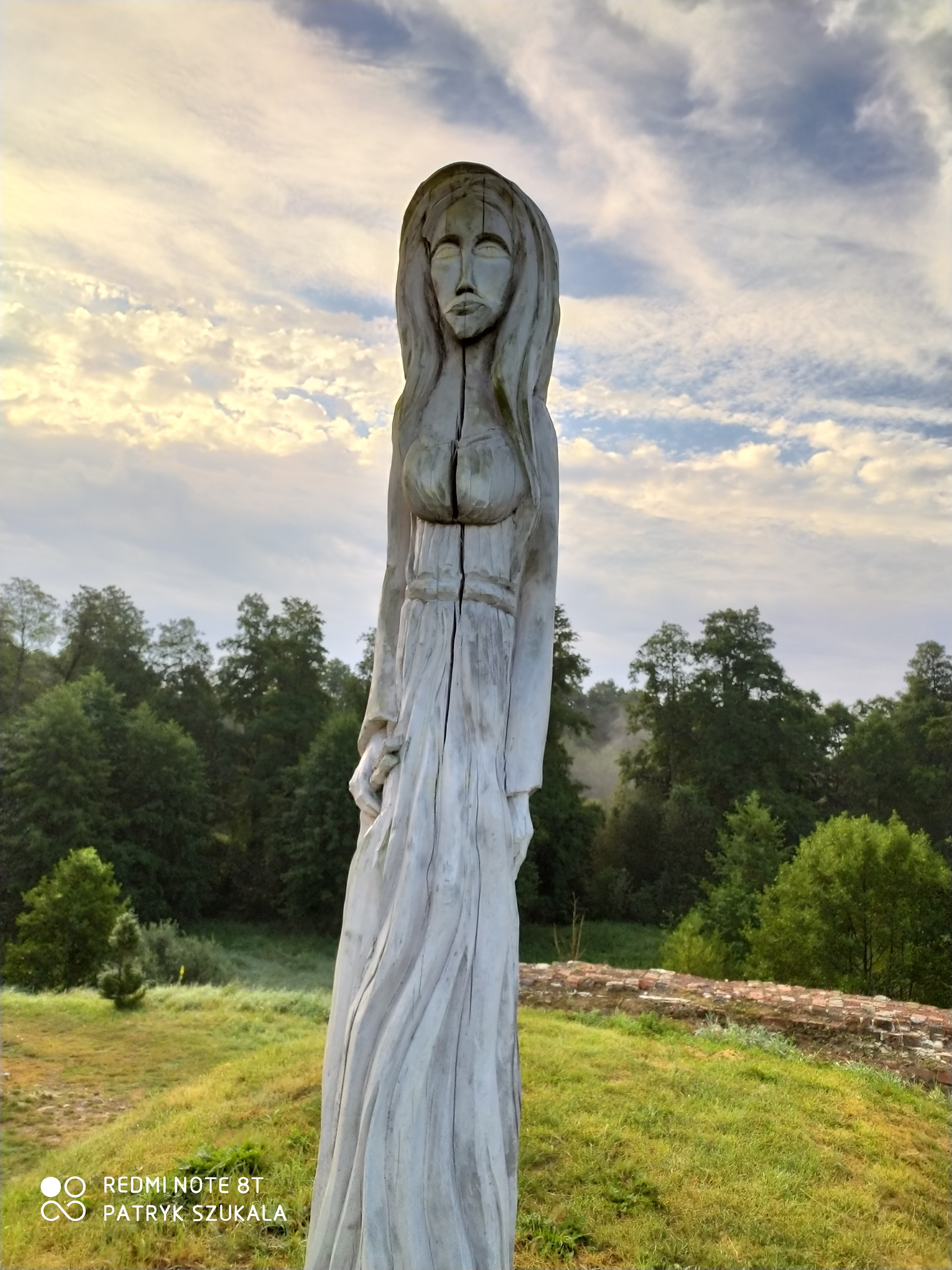
Statue of Mokosh in Klasak, Poland

Mokosh, also known as Makosh, is revered in Slavic neopaganism as the goddess of the earth, fate, harvest, and women's labor. Neopagans consider Mokosh to be a miraculous maiden, the personification of female nature, and the great mother of all living beings. The fifth day of the week is dedicated to women and Mokosh. Communities consisting mainly of women often choose Mokosh as an object of worship. According to the Russian author Alexander Asov, the gods determine the place and time of a person's birth, and their fate is woven by the goddess Makosh. Asov said her sign is a ten-pointed red star on a blue background.

According to the neopagan author Vadim Kazakov, Veles is the son of Svarog and Mokosh, and Dola and Nedola are Mokosh's younger sisters. Veles may also be considered Mokosh's husband. Another husband of Mokosh may be Stribog, with whom she has a daughter Kupala and a son Yarilo. Another neopagan author and volkhv (wise man) Nikolai Spyransky considers Mokosh to be one of the rozhanitsy. The neopagan community, the Kingdom of Mokosh was named after the goddess. The community holds two festivals that are dedicated to the goddess; spring Mokosh is celebrated on March 24 and autumn Mokosh ih celebrated on September 24. In the Union of Slavic Communities of the Slavic Native Faith (USCSNF), chicken is consumed as the ritual food at feasts in honor of Mokosh.

The ritual calendar of the "Veles circle" association, which includes the "Rodolubiye" community, includes the holiday of the Day of Mokosh or Earth Day, which is celebrated on May 9 when Mother Earth awakens after winter. On this day, the goddess is still resting and must not be disturbed by plowing, hoeing, or pile driving. The summer festival Mokosh's Svyatki or Mokrida is celebrated on July 19, when the Eastern Orthodox Church commemorates the day of Macrida. The Dożynki or Obzhynki is celebrated on August 15, and is dedicated to the gathering of the end of the harvest, for which Dazhbog and Mokosh are thanked. The goddess is considered the mother of the harvest and offerings of fruit are made to her on this day. The harvest festival falls on the Orthodox feast of the Dormition of the Mother of God. On this day, Russians celebrated the harvest festival and the beginning of autumn days. In other parts of Russia, the harvest festival was held on August 16 at the Bread Spas, which is also known as Nut Spas, Linen Spas or Water Spas, and is understood in neopaganism as a festival of Mokosh, the lady of the waters, in which women should take small offerings consisting of flax and yarn to a well. The Orthodox Church celebrates the Transfiguration of Jesus on this day.

The festival of Mokoshino Poletye (women's summer), is a series of days from September 1 to 7 that were dedicated to Mokosh. The Day of Rod and Rozhanitsy in Slavic tradition falls on the Nativity of Mary, and is a celebration of family, harvest, and home. It is a time to sum up and welcome autumn in honor of the goddess Mokosh, who in this context is known as the Mother of Autumn. During the Tausienʹ-Radogoshch festival, which coincides with the autumnal equinox, there is a ritual of thanksgiving for the harvest, which includes a ceremony in honor of Mokosh as she walks the fields toward the sun, where Mother Earth is presented with a ceremonial korovai cake. On this day, the svarga is closed and the gods rest until spring. The autumn day of Mokosh is celebrated on October 28, when the earth is believed to fall into winter sleep. After sunset, the priestesses of Mokosh, usually three in number, untangle the "sliver of fate"; they put threads into a cup of enchanted water and predict the future after watching the threads unravel. This holiday coincides with the Orthodox day of Paraskeva Friday.

The volkhvs of the "Veles Circle" developed the Small Circle of Svarog with the dedication of each month to a specific deity; the fifth month May is dedicated to Mokosh and Zhiva, and the eleventh month November to Mokosh and Dark Mara. The author Veleslav (Ilya Cherkasov) identified divine allocations related to the four seasons, days, world directions and elements. The allotments of Veles and Mokosh are associated with autumn, evening, sunset, and air.

On the feast of Kupala Night, women decorate birch trees with ribbons and wreaths of flowers. Neopagans interpret these decorations as an ancient form of sacrifice because the young tree is a symbol of Mother Earth or Mokosh. Nearby, a Yarilo doll made of green branches and hammered into the ground, dressed in ornate embroidery with sacred symbolism, is prepared and given food. The doll and the tree symbolically personify newlyweds.

Mokosh is mentioned in the Book of Veles, which the scientific community considers a forgery created by the writer Yuri Mirolubov in the 20th century. In the story of pagan Bacchanalia on page 32 in the 1994 edition of the Book of Veles, following Asov's translation, "green leaves and mokoshans" are mentioned; green leaves are associated with Mokosh, which the translator understands as "green leaves and seaweed". In the list of pagan gods on pages 302-304, the name of Mokosh does not appear.

== Today ==
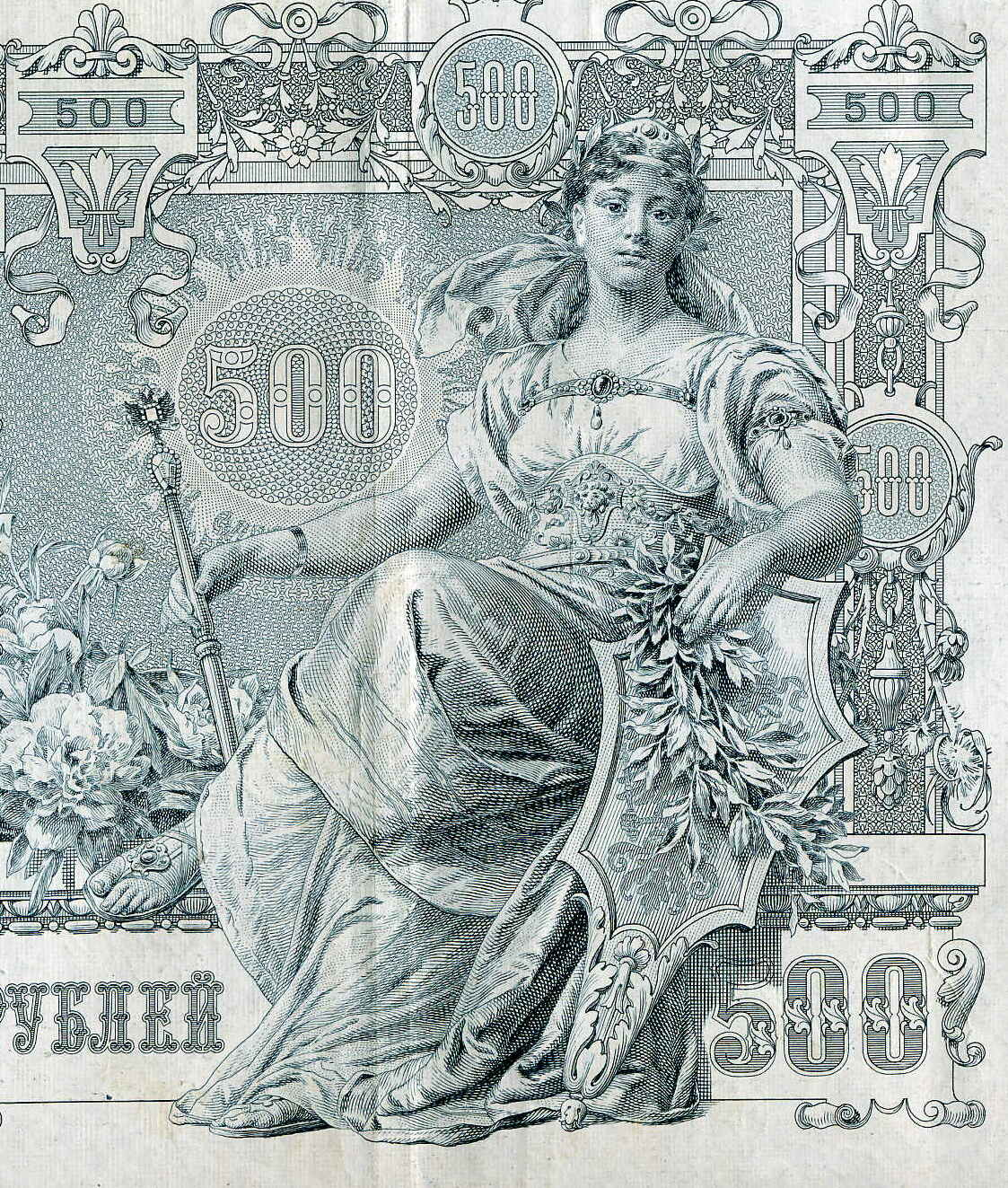
Personification of Russia on the Russian Empire's 500 ruble banknote of 1912

According to the cultural scholars Harald Haarmann and Orlando Figes, the concept of Mother Russia is linked to the earth, "mythical femininity", and motherhood due to the original correspondence of the words Russia and earth (Russian: земля, zemlya) with the grammatical feminine gender and the greater prevalence of depictions of Russia as a motherland rather than a fatherland. Russia's feminine identity is also drawn from folklore, Russian poetry, and literary idioms, indicating the antiquity of the tradition of the connection between femininity and the earth, which was academics eventually elevated to the image of Mokosh as Mat Zemlya.

Mokosha Mons, a mons (mountain) on Venus, is named after Mokosh.

In modern culture, the names of East Slavic deities are used as advertising names. In particular, the name Mokosh or Makosh is used as an ergonym, especially in the names of companies related to agriculture, crafts, cosmetology, and tailoring because in popular culture, Mokosh is understood as the goddess of female crafts. Religious scholar Andrey Beskov noted company naming is often based on pseudoscientific speculation.

Higher School of Economics (HSE) staff investigated the linguosemiotic aspect of Russian folk culture. To study it, they conducted an association survey in which among the proposed words, the name Mokosh was represented by a variant of Makosh. Respondents did not notice this change in spelling, which is probably due to the de-etymologization of the deity's name in contemporary literature containing its variants Maketa, Makosh, Makosha, Mokosh, and Mokosha. As of 2025, there is no established spelling for this name.

== See also ==
- Hera
- Juno
- Sif
- Žemyna
- Dodola and Perperuna

== Bibliography ==
Books

- Alekseyev, Anatoly (2004). "От составителя". Что думают учёные о "Велесовой книге" (PDF) (in Russian). Petersburg: Наука. pp. 3–5. ISBN 5-02-027121-7.
- Alekseyev, Anatoly (2004). "Опять о «Велесовой книге»". Что думают учёные о "Велесовой книге" (in Russian). Petersburg: Наука. pp. 94–108. ISBN 5-02-027121-7.
- Álvarez-Pedrosa, Juan Antonio (2021). Sources of Slavic Pre-Christian Religion. Leiden: Koninklijke Brill. ISBN 978-90-04-44138-5.
- Anichkov, Evgeny (1914). Язычество и древняя Русь. Petersburg: Типография М. М. Стасюловича.
- Barsov, Elpidifor (1887). "Слово о полку Игореве", как художественный памятник Киевской дружинной Руси. Vol. 1. Moscow: В университетской типографии (М. Катков).
- Barsov, Elpidifor (1894). "Об олонецких древностях". Олонецкий сборник. Материалы для истории, географии, статистики и этнографии Олонецкого края. Выпуск 3. Pietrozawodsk: Типография губернского правления.
- Belova, Olga (2004). "Неделя". In Tolstoy, Nikita (ed.). Slavic Antiquities: Ethnolinguistic Dictionary (in Russian). Vol. 3: К (Круг) — П (Перепелка). Moscow: Institute for Slavic Studies of the Russian Academy of Sciences. pp. 391–392. ISBN 5-7133-1207-0.
- Beskov, Andrey (2015). Язычество восточных славян. От древности к современности. Niżny Nowogród: ФГБОУ ВО «НГПУ».
- Beskov, Andrey (2015). "Русское неоязычество в свете данных эргонимики: методы и перспективы изучения". Религиоведческие исследования (in Russian) (1) (11 ed.). Moscow: 9–22. ISSN 2224-6711.
- Beskov, Andrey (2018). "Восточнославянское язычество в зеркале российской повседневности". Kultūras studijas. Zinātnisko rakstu krājums (in Russian). X. Daugavpils: Daugavpils Universitāte: 138–15 3.
- Brückner, Aleksander (1985). Mitologia słowiańska. Warszawa: Państwowe Wydawnictwo Naukowe. ISBN 8301062452.
- Danilevsky, Igor (2004). Повесть временных лет: герменевтические основы изучения летописных текстов (PDF). Moscow: Аспект – Пресс. ISBN 9785756703450.
- Figes, Orlando (2002). Natasha's Dance: a cultural history of Russia. N. Y: Metropolitan Books. ISBN 9780805057836.
- Galkovsky, Nikolay (1913). Борьба христианства с остатками язычества в древней Руси. Vol. II. Moscow: Печатня А. И. Снегиревой.
- Galkovsky, Nikolay (1916). Борьба христианства с остатками язычества в древней Руси. Vol. I. Charków: Епархиальная типография.
- Gaydukov, Viktor (2000). Идеология и практика славянского неоязычества. Petersburg: Herzen University.
- Gerasimov, Mikhail (1910). Словzарь уездного Череповецкого говора. Petersburg: Типография Императорской академии наук.
- Gieysztor, Aleksander (2006). Mitologia Słowian. Warszawa: Wydawnictwa Uniwersytetu Warszawskiego. ISBN 978-83-235-0234-0.
- Ivanov, Vyacheslav; Toporov, Vladimir (1983). "К реконструкции Мокоши как женского персонажа в славянской версии основного мифа". Балто-славянские исследования (PDF). Moscow: Наука.
- Kalygin, Viktor (2006). Этимологический словарь кельтских теонимов (PDF). Moscow: Наука. ISBN 5-02-034377-3.
- Kelemina, Jakob (1930). Bajke in pripovedke slovenskega ljudstva (in Slovenian). Celje: Družba sv. Mohorja.
- Klejn, Leo (2004). Воскрешение Перуна. К реконструкции славянского язычества. Petersburg: Евразия. ISBN 5-8071-0153-7.
- Kosmenko, Anna (2002). Традиционный орнамент финноязычных народов северо-западной части России. Pietrozawodsk: Карельский научный центр РАН. ISBN 5-9274-0082-5.
- Kropej, Monika (2012). Supernatural Beings from Slovenian Myth and Folktales. Studia mythologica Slavica. Supplementa. Supplementum 6. Ljubljana: Založba ZRC. ISBN 978-961-254-428-7.
- Kutarev, Oleg (2023). "Introduction to the Slavic pagan pantheon: The names of deities that the ancient Slavs actually revered". In Lajoye, Patrice; Zochios, Stamatis (eds.). New researches on the religion and mythology of the Pagan Slavs 2. Lingva. pp. 5–46.
- Lajoye, Patrice (2022). Mythologie et religion des slaves païens (in French). Paris: Les Belles Lettres. ISBN 978-2-251-91771-9.
- Levin, Eve (2004). Двоеверие и народная религия в России. Moscow: Индрик. ISBN 5-85759-284-4.
- Levkiyevska, Yelena; Tolstaya, Svetlana (2004). "Параскева Пятница". In Tolstoy, Nikita (ed.). Slavic Antiquities: Ethnolinguistic Dictionary (in Russian). Vol. 3: К (Круг) — П (Перепелка). Moscow: Institute for Slavic Studies of the Russian Academy of Sciences. pp. 631–633. ISBN 5-7133-1207-0.
- Łowmiański, Henryk (1979). Religia Słowian i jej upadek, w. VI-XII. Warszawa: Państwowe Wydawnictwo Naukowe. ISBN 83-01-00033-3.
- Łuczyński, Michał (2020). Bogowie dawnych Słowian. Studium onomastyczne (in Polish). Kielce: Kieleckie Towarzystwo Naukowe. ISBN 978-83-60777-83-1.
- Łuczyński, Michał (2022). Mity Słowian. Śladami świętych opowieści przodków (in Polish). Szczecin: Triglav. ISBN 978-83-62586-70-7.
- Mačuda, Jiří (2012). Ideologie rodnověří v názorech a praxi jeho čelních představitelů (se zaměřením na genezi a proměny obřadu). Disertační práce (PDF) (in Czech). Masarykova univerzita.
- Madlevska, Yelena (2005). Русская мифология. Энциклопедия. Moscow: Мидгард, Эксмо. ISBN 5-699-13535-9.
- Mansikka, Viljo (2016). Труды по религии восточных славян (PDF). Moscow: Форум. ISBN 978-5-00091-182-2.
- Mikhaylov, Nikolay (2017). История славянской мифологии в XX веке (PDF). Moscow: Институт славяноведения РАН. ISBN 978-5-7576-0380-3.
- Mokiyenko, Valery (1986). Образы русской речи. Историко-этимологические и этнолингвистические очерки фразеологии. Leningrad: Издательство ленинградского университета.
- Olmsted, Garrett S. (2019). The Gods of the Celts and the Indo-Europeans (revised). Innsbruck: Instituts für Sprachwissenschaft. ISBN 978-3-85124-173-0.
- Panchenko, Aleksandr (1998). Исследование в области народного православия. Деревенские святыни северо-запада России. Petersburg: Алетейя.
- Panteleyeva, Liliya; Chorobrych, Stanisław (2022). Лингвосемиотика похоронной культуры: деревня и город. Moscow: Изд. дом Высшей школы экономики. ISBN 978-5-7598-2680-4.
- Pauli, Żegota (1839). Pieśni ludu ruskiego w Galicyi (in Polish). Nakł. Kajetana Jabłlońskiego.
- Petrukhin, Vladimir (2000). "Древняя Русь. Народ. Князья. Религия.". Из истории русской культуры. Язык. Семиотика. Культура. Vol. I. Древняя Русь. Moscow: Языки русской культуры. ISBN 5-7859-0093-9.
- Petrukhin, Vladimir (2009). "Пряха". In Tolstoy, Nikita (ed.). Slavic Antiquities: Ethnolinguistic Dictionary (in Russian). Vol. 4: П (Переправа через воду) — С (Сито). Moscow: Institute for Slavic Studies of the Russian Academy of Sciences. pp. 338–339. ISBN 978-5-7133-0703-5.
- Petrukhin, Vladimir (2014). Русь в IX–X веках. От призвания варягов до выбора веры (PDF) (2-е изд., испр. и доп. / В. Я. Петрухин ed.). Moscow: Форум; Неолит. ISBN 978-5-91134-691-1.
- Petrukhin, Vladimir (2014). "Мокошь, Мокушь". In Mielnikowa, Yelena; Petrukhin, Vladimir (eds.). Древняя Русь в средневековом мире. Moscow: Ладомир. pp. 508–509. ISBN 978-5-86218-530-0.
- Prokofyev, Andrey; Filatov, Sergey; Koskello, Anastasiya (2006). Burdo, Maykl; Filatov, Sergey (eds.). "Славянское и скандинавское язычества. Викканство". Современная религиозная жизнь России. Опыт систематического исследования (in Russian). IV: 155–207. ISBN 5-98704-057-4.
- Pukanec, Martin (2013). Etymologický nákres slovanského sveta bohov a démonov: (náboženstva a morálky Slovanov) (in Slovak). Nitra: Vydavate Univerzita Konštantína Filozofa v Nitre. ISBN 978-80-558-0280-0.
- Rusanova, Irina; Timoshchuk, Boris (2007). Языческие святилища древних славян (PDF) (2-е изд., испр. ed.). Moscow: Ладога-100. ISBN 978-5-94494-051-3.
- Rybakov, Boris (2013). Язычество древних славян. Moscow: Академический Проект. ISBN 978-5-8291-1392-6.
- Sreznevsky, Izmail (1902). "Мокошь=Мокъшь". Материалы для словаря древнерусского языка по письменным памятникам. Vol. Второй. Л – П. Petersburg: Типография императорской академии наук.
- Strakhov, Aleksandr (2000). "Письменная фиксация и этимология (мелкие наблюдения)". Этимология. 1997–1999. Moscow: Наука. ISBN 5-02-022540-1.
- Strzelczyk, Jerzy (1998). Mity, podania i wierzenia dawnych Słowian. Poznań: Dom Wydawniczy Rebis. ISBN 83-7120-688-7.
- Szyjewski, Andrzej (2003). Religia Słowian. Kraków: Wydawnictwo WAM. ISBN 83-7318-205-5.
- Téra, Michal (2024). Perun: gromowładny bóg. Ku religii dawnych Słowian (in Polish). Translated by Górewicz, Igor. Szczecin: Triglav. ISBN 978-83-62586-23-3.
- Tolstaya, Svetlana (2009). "Пятница". In Tolstoy, Nikita (ed.). Slavic Antiquities: Ethnolinguistic Dictionary (in Russian). Vol. 4: П (Переправа через воду) — С (Сито). Moscow: Institute for Slavic Studies of the Russian Academy of Sciences. pp. 382–385. ISBN 978-5-7133-0703-5.
- Tolstaya, Svetlana (2012). "Среда". In Tolstoy, Nikita (ed.). Slavic Antiquities: Ethnolinguistic Dictionary (in Russian). Vol. 5: С (Сказка) — Я (Ящерица). Moscow: Institute for Slavic Studies of the Russian Academy of Sciences. pp. 150–151. ISBN 978-5-7133-1380-7.
- Toporkow, Andrey (2002). "Сказка про бога Посвистача". Рукописи, которых не было. Подделки в области славянского фольклора. Moscow: Ладомир. ISBN 5-86218-381-7.
- Toporov, Vladimir (1982). "Древняя Москва в балтийской перспективе". Балто-славянские исследования (PDF). Moscow: Наука.
- Toporov, Vladimir (1995). "Боги". In Tolstoy, Nikita (ed.). Slavic Antiquities: Ethnolinguistic Dictionary (in Russian). Vol. 1: А (Август) — Г (Гусь). Moscow: Institute for Slavic Studies of the Russian Academy of Sciences. pp. 204–215. ISBN 5-7133-0704-2.
- Toporov, Vladimir (1998). Предыстория литературы у славян: Опыт реконструкции: Введение в курс истории славянских литератур. Moscow: Российский государственный гуманитарный университет. ISBN 5-7281-0171-2.
- Toporov, Vladimir (2011). Мифология: Статьи для мифологических энциклопедий. Vol. 1. А – О. Moscow: Языки славянских культур. ISBN 978-5-9551-0555-0.
- Trubachyov, Oleg, ed. (1992). "*mokoš/*mokoša". Этимологический словарь славянских языков. Vol. 19 (*męs’arь – *morzakъ). Moscow: Nauka. pp. 131–134.
- Trubachyov, Oleg, ed. (1992). "*mokosъ". Этимологический словарь славянских языков. Vol. 19 (*męs’arь – *morzakъ). Moscow: Nauka. pp. 130–131.
- Trubachyov, Oleg, ed. (1992). "*moky". Этимологический словарь славянских языков. Vol. 19 (*męs’arь – *morzakъ). Moscow: Nauka. p. 149.
- Tyutina, Olga; Saberov, Rushan (2017). "Культ Рода и рожаниц в неоязыческом пантеоне". Манускрипт (in Russian) (9) (83 ed.). Грамота: 199–201. ISSN 1997-292X.
- Urbańczyk, Stanisław (1991). Dawni Słowianie Wiara i kult (PDF) (in Polish). Wrocław: Ossolineum. ISBN 83-04-03825-0.
- Valencova, Marina (2009). "Прядение". In Tolstoy, Nikita (ed.). Slavic Antiquities: Ethnolinguistic Dictionary (in Russian). Vol. 4: П (Переправа через воду) — С (Сито). Moscow: Institute for Slavic Studies of the Russian Academy of Sciences. pp. 321–328. ISBN 978-5-7133-0703-5.
- Vasneva, Olga (2007). "Имя собственное в демонологической лексике (на материале пермских говоров)". Живая речь Пермского края в синхронии и диахронии. Материалы исследования. Часть I (PDF) (in Russian). Perm: Пермский государственный университет. pp. 134–141. ISBN 5-7944-0998-3.
- Vasilyev, Mikhail (1999). Язычество восточных славян накануне крещения Руси: Религиозно-мифологическое взаимодействие с иранским миром. Языческая реформа князя Владимира (PDF). Moscow: Индрик. ISBN 5-85759-087-6.
- Vasilyev, Valery (2012). Славянские топонимические древности Новгородской земли. 1150 лет российской государственности. Moscow: Рукописные памятники Древней Руси. ISBN 978-5-9551-0607-6.
- Vasmer, Max (1986). "Мокоша". Этимологический словарь русского языка. Vol. II: Е – Муж. Translated by Trubachyov, Oleg. Moscow: Прогресс. p. 640.
- Vlasova, Marina (2008). Энциклопедия русских суеверий. Petersburg: Азбука-классика. ISBN 978-5-91181-705-3.
- Vvedensky, Anton (2023). Сюжеты о христианизации Руси в Повести временных лет и в составе Пролога. Диссертация на соискание ученой степени кандидата филологических наук (PDF) (in Russian). Moscow: Национальный исследовательский университет «Высшая школа экономики».
- Zabiyako, Andrey (2022). "Религия славян". In Jabłokow, Igor (ed.). История религии в 2 томах. Vol. 1. Книга 2. Религии Древнего мира. Народностно-национальные религии: учебник для вузов (4 ed.). Юрайт. pp. 236–286. ISBN 978-5-534-03389-2.
- Zhuravlev, Anatoly (2005). Язык и миф. Лингвистический комментарий к труду А. Н. Афанасьева "Поэтические воззрения славян на природу" (PDF). Традиционная духовная культура славян. Современные исследования. Moscow: Indrik. ISBN 5-85759-318-2.
- Zubov, Mykola (1994). "Дива". In Trubachyov, Oleg (ed.). Русская ономастика и ономастика России. Словарь. Moscow: Школа-Пресс. pp. 53–54. ISBN 5-88527-066-X.
- Zubov, Mykola (2005). Слов'янські повчання проти язичництва в лінгвотекстологічному висвітленні: Дисертація на здобуття наукового ступеня доктора філологічних наук (in Ukrainian). Odessa: Odesa I. I. Mechnykov National University.
- Памятники общественной мысли Древней Руси: В 3-х т. Vol. 1: Домонгольский период. Igor Danilevsky (preface and comment). Moscow: Российская политическая энциклопедия (РОСПЭНН). 2010. ISBN 978-5-8243-1234-8.
- Повесть временных лет. Translated by Likhachev, Dmitry; Trubachyov, Oleg. Aleksandra Bobrova, Sergei Nikolaev, Andrey Chernov (comments); Anton Vvedenski, Leontii Voitovych, Myud Mechev. Petersburg: Вита Нова. 2012. ISBN 978-5-93898-386-1.

Journals

- Blažek, Václav (2006). "Celto-Slavic Parallels in Mythology and Sacral Lexicon. In: Parallels between Celtic and Slavic". Studia Celto-Slavica. Coleraine: Graham & Heslip: 75–85. doi:10.54586/TVGF2195.
- Haarmann, Harald (2000). "The Soul of Mother Russia: Russian Symbols and Pre-Russian Cultural Identity". Re-vision: A Journal of Knowledge and Consciousness. 23 (1): 6–16. ISSN 0275-6935.
- Kozlova, Natalya (2014). Kozlova, Natalya; Podkorytowa, Tatjana (eds.). ""Дракон обыкновенный", или О том, почему не состоялась одна "научная" сенсация". Встреча культур в пространстве Сибири: научные исследования, мемуаристика, художественная критика (in Russian). Omsk: Полиграфист: 191–199. ISBN 9785982360618.
- Kregždys, Rolandas (2021). "Pseudomitologemos "Milda" kilmė" (PDF). Baltu filoloģija (in Lithuanian). XXX (1–2): 26–51. doi:10.22364/bf.30.02. ISSN 1691-0036.
- Kutarev, Oleg (2013). "Характеристика Рода и Рожаниц в славянской мифологии: интерпретации Б. А. Рыбакова и его предшественников" (PDF). Религиоведение (in Russian) (4): 170–177. ISSN 2072-8662.
- Kutarev, Oleg (2016). "Славянский Дажьбог как развитие индоевропейского Бога Сияющего Неба (Дьеус-Патер)". Философия и культура (in Russian) (97): 126–140. doi:10.7256/1999-2793.2016.1.17386. ISSN 2454-0757.
- Lamansky, Vladimir, ed. (1898). "Материалы лексикографические по новгородским говорам" (PDF). Живая старина. Периодическое издание отделения этнографии имперского русского географического общества. (in Russian). Petersburg: Типография князя В. П. Мещерского: 393–408.
- Lukin, Pavel (2009). "Сказание о варягах-мучениках в начальном летописании и Прологе: текстологический аспект" (PDF). Древняя Русь (in Russian) (3): 73–96. ISSN 2071-9574.
- Lukin, Pavel (2011). "Языческая "реформа" Владимира Святославича в начальном летописании: устная традиция или литературные реthumbсценции?" (PDF). Древнейшие государства Восточной Европы: Устная традиция в письменном тексте (in Russian). Galin Głazyrin (red.). Moscow: Русский Фонд Содействия Образованию и Науке: 326–352. ISBN 978-5-91244-107-3.
- Łuczyński, Michał (2014). "William of Malmesbury's "Fortune" (Gesta Rerum Anglorum II 12) – An Attempt at a New Interpretation". Studia mythologica Slavica (17). Ljubljana: 83–89. doi:10.3986/sms.v17i0.1496. ISSN 1408-6271.
- Rabinovich, Roman (2000). "Искушение "волошским орехом", или Балканские волохи и русские волхвы". Stratum Plus (in Russian) (5): 262–390. ISSN 1608-9057.
- Słupecki, Leszek P.; Zaroff, Roman (1999). "William of Malmesbury on Pagan Slavic Oracles: New Sources for Slavic Paganism and its two Interpretations". Studia mythologica Slavica (2). Ljubljana: 9–20. doi:10.3986/sms.v2i0.1841. ISSN 1408-6271.
- Tolstaya, Svetlana (2017). "Заметки на полях "Новгородского областного словаря"". Verba. Северо-Западный лингвистический журнал (in Russian) (3 (11)): 1–5. ISSN 2411-7951.
- Zubov, Mykola (1981). "О теониме Мокошь" (PDF). Этимологические исследования (in Russian). 2. Sverdlovsk: 149–160. ISSN 2310-757X.
- Zubov, Mykola (1995). "Научные фантомы славянского олимпа". Живая старина (in Russian). 7 (3): 46–49. ISSN 0204-3432.
- Witkowski, Teodolius (1970). "Mythologisch motivierte altpolabische Ortsnamen". Zeitschrift für Slawistik (in German). 15 (1). Berlin: Akademie Verlag: 368–385. doi:10.1524/slaw.1970.15.1.368.
