= Biritch =

Herald and announcer in Kievan Rus'

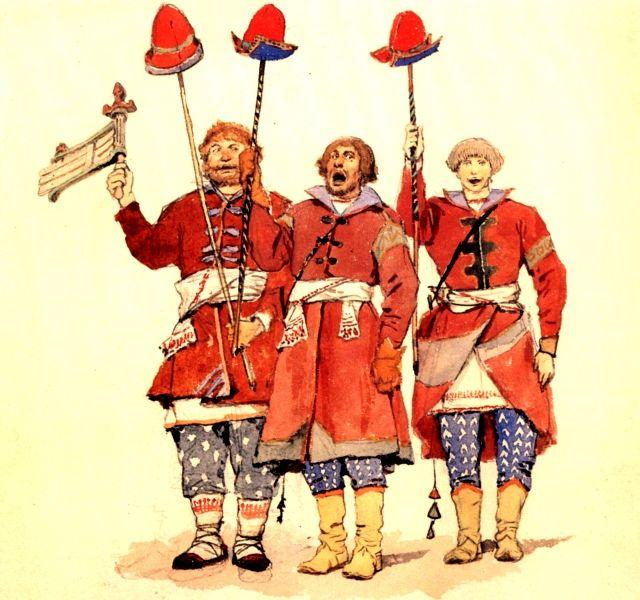
Biryuchi, (Note: Vasnetsov's painting reflects the explanation of Vasily Tatishchev: "A birich <...> when something was announced among the people, then he would raise a hat or a wooden eagle on a staff and shout, as is now announced through a drum.") Viktor Vasnetsov, 1885

A biritch (also birich or biryuch; Russian: бирич, бирюч, pl. биричи, birchi) in Kievan Rus' was a herald, an announcer of the will of a knyaz (prince), sometimes his deputy in police or diplomatic affairs, or tax collector. A biritch travelled to settlements, played bugle or horn in the center of a town square or yard to gather people and read the announcement.

The biritch is mainly known from later sources, and in Novgorod, he played a prominent role and is mentioned as a judicial officer.

== Etymology ==
The Etymological Dictionary of Slavic Languages lists a large number of similar words (birić , birič, bĕric, etc.) in several Slavic languages, suggesting their association with the root bir-, meaning "to take" in Slavic languages, deriving the meaning "tax collector". The listed Old East Slavic meaning is "an official with the duty to announce the authorities' orders to the people".

In the past other hypotheses were suggested, however the Etymological Dictionary of Slavic Languages dismisses them as dubious.

== History ==
The biritch is mentioned in manuscripts since the 10th century and until the end of the 17th century. The Laurentian Codex mentions under the year of 992 that Vladimir the Great, when looking for a volunteer to fight a Pecheneg baghatur have sent a biritch in regiments.

The ancient origins of the biritch remain unclear. However, later sources indicate that the position was common in Novgorod, where the biritch is frequently mentioned. Even in Muscovite sources, the biritch is usually associated with Novgorod. The detsky fulfilled judicial functions and may originally have been a common Slavic official who collected taxes. The biritch is mentioned in some sources as a judicial officer in place of the detsky. For example, the functions of the biritch are outlined in the Novgorod Judicial Charter. However, in Novgorodian sources, the biritch is grouped with the izvetnik, podvoysky, sofyanin, and other officials, but these offices are not consistently distinguished from one another.

Later, the Muscovite tsars issued various decrees using biritchi. The heads of the Eastern Orthodox Church also used biritchi to announce their decrees. A biritch was supposed to make an announcement in a marketplace, not once but many times, sometimes during several months. Later, other administrators (namestniki, voyevody, etc.) had birichi in their staff, as mentioned in payrolls.

== Card game ==
Biritch was also the name of a 19th-century card game, of possibly Russian influence. It became popular in the West as the game of Bridge during the mid-1890s.

== Bibliography ==
- Kaiser, Daniel H. (14 July 2014). The Growth of the Law in Medieval Russia. Princeton University Press. ISBN 978-1-4008-5559-9.
