= List of saints named Paraskevi =

Saint Paraskevi (Greek: Παρασκευή, lit. 'preparation, referring to the day of preparation for Sabbath, i.e. Friday') or (Greek: Αγία Παρασκευή, Aghia Paraskevi; Albanian: Shën Premte; Bulgarian: Света Петка Параскева; Macedonian: Света Петка; Romanian: Sfânta Cuvioasă Parascheva; Russian: Святая Параскева-Пятница; Serbian: Света Петка Параскева) can refer to one of several saints.

Variations of the name include Petka, Paraskeva, Praskovia, Praskovie, Pyatnitsa, Pyetka, Paraskevoula, Paraschiva Voula, Vivi and Evi.

Saints with the name (or variants) include:

- Paraskevi of Rome, or Parasceva in Latin, 2nd-century martyr, feast day: July 26
- Paraskevi of Iconium (Paraskeva Pyatnitsa), 3rd-century virgin martyr venerated in Russia, feast day: October 28
- Parascheva of the Balkans (also known as Petka, Petca Parasceva, Paraskeva Pyatnitsa, Parascheva of Tirnovo, Parascheva the Serbian, Parascheva of Belgrade, Parascheva the New, Parascheva the Young, Parascheva of the Balkans, Paraskevi of Serbia), 11th century ascetic, feast day: October 14
- Paraskevi, the sister of St. Photini the Samaritan Woman, feast day: March 20
- Saint Paraskevi (personification of Friday), venerated in Slavic lands
- Venera of Rome (died 143), whose name is a rough Latin translation of Parascheva
