= Paraskevi of Iconium =

Christian martyr

Saint Paraskevi of Iconium

Great-Martyr
- Died: 3rd century Iconium (modern-day Konya, Turkey)
- Venerated in: Eastern Orthodox Church; Roman Catholic Church Eastern Catholicism
- Feast: October 28
- Attributes: red robe of martyrdom; vessel of perfume; Eastern Cross; scroll
- Patronage: traders and fairs; marriage (Russia)

Saint Paraskevi of Iconium (also known as Paraskeva Pyatnitsa) and in Bulgaria (Sveta Petka Samardjiyska - lit. "Saint Petka of the Saddlemakers") is venerated as a Christian virgin martyr. According to Christian tradition, she was born to a rich family of Iconium. Her parents were Christian, and Paraskevi was named as such (the name means "Friday" in Greek) because she was baptized on a Friday, the day of Christ's Passion.

== Life ==
According to tradition, Paraskevi converted a man named Antoninus to Christianity. She was subsequently martyred at Iconium during the persecutions of Diocletian.

== Veneration ==
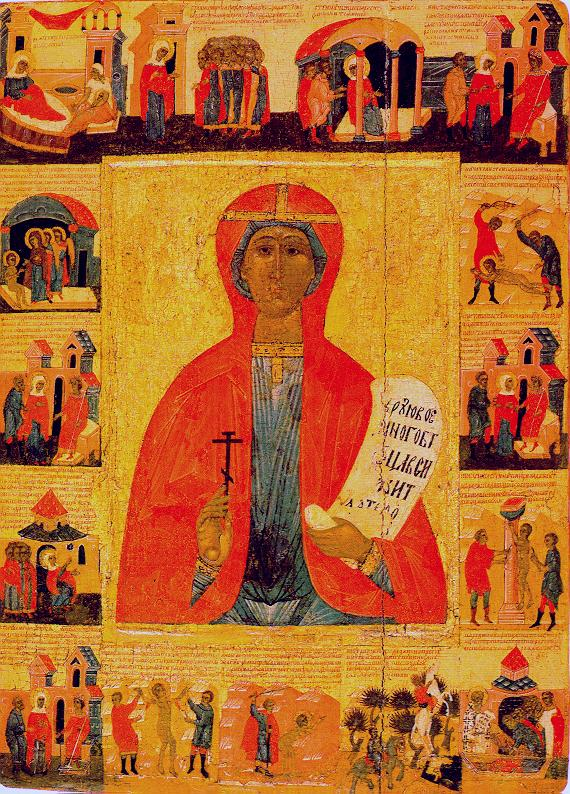
Scenes from the Life of St. Paraskeva. Russian icon.

An account of her martyrdom was written by John of Euboea. Paraskeva's cult and attributes became confused with that of other saints with the same name as well as pre-Christian deities of the Slavs.

As one scholar asks:

Was Parasceve, or Paraskeva, an early Christian maiden named in honor of the day of the Crucifixion? Or was she a personification of that day, pictured cross in hand to assist the fervor of the faithful? And was the Paraskeva of the South Slavs the same who made her appearance in northern Russia?

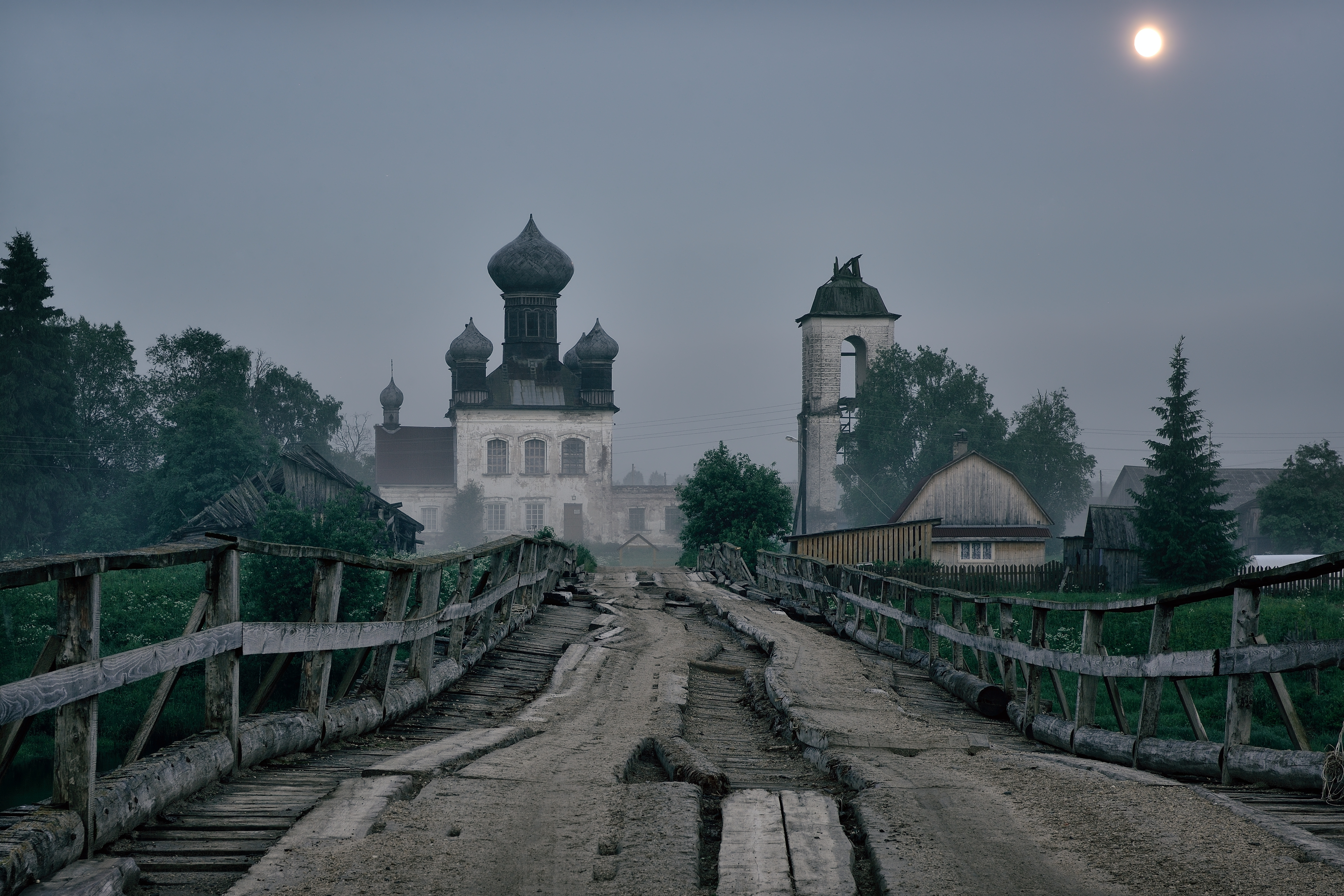
Church of Paraskeva Pyatnitsa in Leshino in Arkhangelsk Oblast, Russia.

Paraskeva-Pyatnitsa "developed a personality and functions of her own on Russian soil." Icons of the 13th-15th centuries from Novgorod depict Paraskeva as an ascetic figure wearing the red of martyrdom. She holds an Eastern cross, a scroll professing her faith, or a vessel that holds the perfume of martyrdom. She was depicted with St. Anastasia or St. Barbara or St. Juliana; sometimes she is depicted with male saints.

In Russia, Paraskeva-Pyatnitsa was the patroness of traders and fairs, and of marriage. She is also the protectress of fields and cattle.

== Eastern Slavs ==
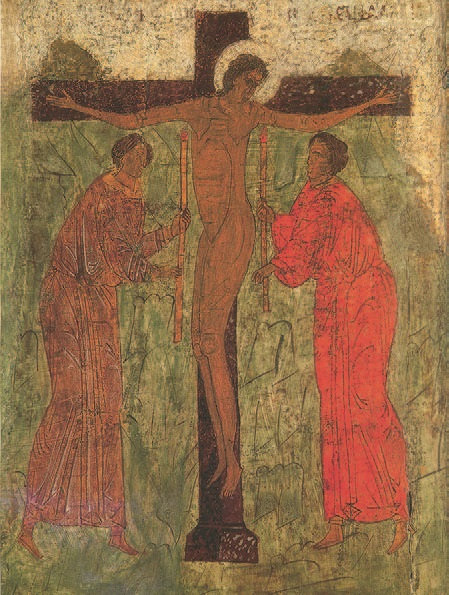
Martyrdom of St. Paraskeva by fire. Branding of a hagiographic icon

The veneration of Paraskeva by the eastern Slavs was closely associated with the ancient cult of the pagan Mokosha, to whom women dedicated Friday afternoon. The saint received the double name Paraskeva-Pyatnitsa, (Russian: Параскева Пятница) meaning "Paraskeva Friday". Russified forms of the name Paraskeva (Greek: Παρασκευή) were also popular, as Praskovya and diminutives Parasha and Pana.

Many Eastern Slavic churches bear the name of St. Friday, such as Paraskeva Pyatnitsa Chapel overlooking Krasnoyarsk. The Slavic correspondent of "Friday", as Russian "Pyanitsa", even became a feminine name in its own right, which could exist alongside Praskovya.
