= Oleg Trubachyov =

Soviet and Russian linguist (1930–2002)

Oleg Nikolayevich Trubachyov (also transliterated as Trubachev or Trubačev, Russian: Оле́г Никола́евич Трубачёв; 23 October 1930, in Stalingrad – 9 March 2002, in Moscow) was a Russian linguist. A researcher of the etymology of Slavic languages and Slavic onomastics, he was considered a specialist in historical linguistics and lexicography. He was a Doctor of Sciences in Philological Sciences, an academician of the Russian Academy of Sciences and served as the editor-in-chief of the Etimologiya yearbook. His works are on the etymology of Slavic languages and on East Slavic onomastics.

He graduated from Dnipropetrovsk University in 1952. He became deputy director of the Russian Language Institute in 1966 and served as the head of the institute's sector on etymology and onomastics.

== Selected works ==
- Oleg Trubachev [translation with substantial additions to each entry] Vasmer M.: Etimologicheskii slovar russkogo yazyka, 1st edition 1964–1973; 3rd edition 1996 Etymological Dictionary of the Russian language - online
- Oleg Trubachev [editor-in-chief] Etimologicheskii slovar slavianskikh yazykov, since 1974, Volume 31 appeared in 2005 Etymological Dictionary of Slavic languages
- Oleg Trubachev, Etnogenez i kultura drevneyshikh Slavian: lingvistichesskiye issledovaniya, 1991 [Ethnogenesis and culture of the oldest Slavs: linguistic studies]
- Oleg Trubachev, V poiskakh edinstva: vzglyad filologa na problemu istokov Rusi (Moscow: Nauka, 1997)
- Oleg Trubachev, Indoarica v Severnom Prichernomorye (Moscow: Nauka, 1999).

== Sources ==
- L. V. Shutko and L. A. Gindin, Oleg Nikolayevich Trubachyov (Moscow: Nauka, 1992). ISBN 9785020111356; OCLC 30316443. (in Russian)
- Академик Олег Николаевич Трубачев: очерки, воспоминания, материалы / гл.ред. Е. П. Челышев, сост. Г. А. Богатова, А. К. Шапошников. - М.: Наука, 2009. - 627 с.: илл. - (Ученые России: очерки, воспоминания, материалы). - ISBN 978-5-02-035710-5.
