= Mokošín =

- Municipality
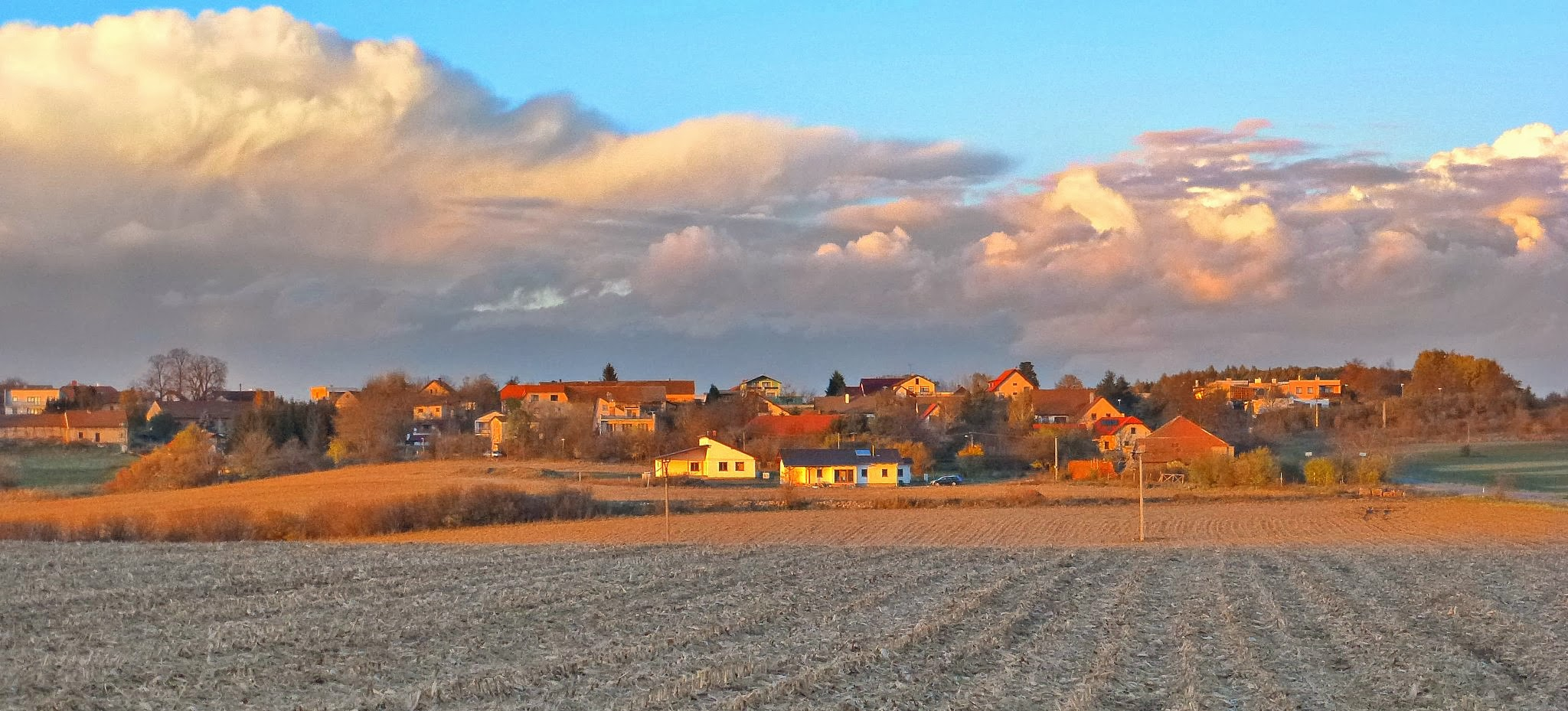
- General view

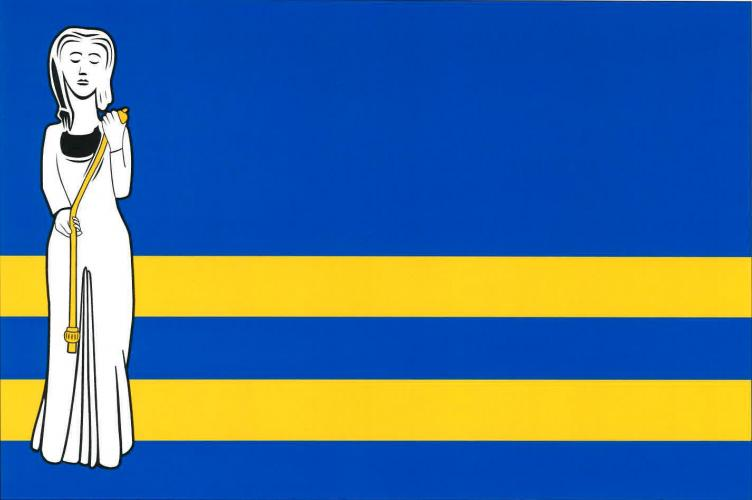
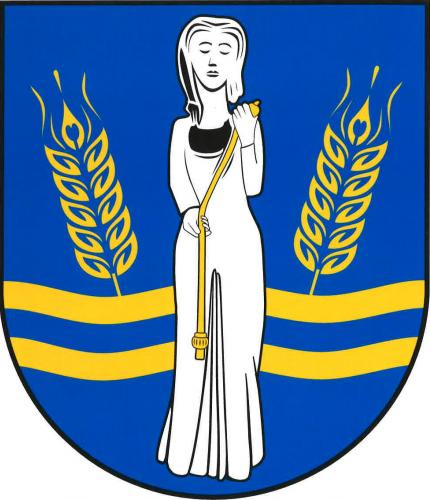
- Flag Coat of arms

- Location in the Czech Republic
- Coordinates: 50°0′54″N 15°34′19″E
- Country: Czech Republic
- Region: Pardubice
- District: Pardubice
- First mentioned: 1073

Area
  - Total: 1.70 km^{2} (0.66 sq mi)
- Elevation: 250 m (820 ft)

Population (2026-01-01)
  - Total: 173
  - Density: 102/km^{2} (264/sq mi)
- Time zone: UTC+1 (CET)
  - Summer (DST): UTC+2 (CEST)
- Postal code: 535 01
- Website: www.obecmokosin.cz

Mokošín is a municipality and village in Pardubice District in the Pardubice Region of the Czech Republic. It has about 200 inhabitants.

== Demographics ==
Historical population
Year	Pop.	±%
1869	156	—
1880	170	+9.0%
1890	174	+2.4%
1900	164	−5.7%
1910	133	−18.9%
1921	132	−0.8%
1930	116	−12.1%
1950	99	−14.7%
1961	99	+0.0%
1970	95	−4.0%
1980	135	+42.1%
1991	172	+27.4%
2001	172	+0.0%
2011	159	−7.6%
2021	178	+11.9%
Source: Censuses
