= Evgeny Anichkov =

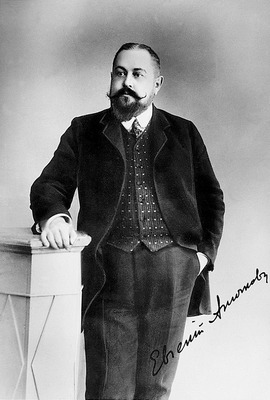
- Born: Евгений Васильевич Аничков; 14 January 1866; Borovichi, Novgorod Governorate, Russian Empire
- Died: 22 October 1937 (aged 71); Belgrade, Yugoslavia
- Occupations: literary historian, critic, folklorist

Evgeny Vasilyevich Anichkov (Russian: Евге́ний Васи́льевич Ани́чков, 14 January 1866, Borovichi, Novgorod Governorate, Russian Empire — 22 October 1937, Belgrade, Yugoslavia) was a Russian literary critic and historian who specialised in the Slavic folklore and mythology, as well as their relation to and use in Russian literature.

His 1905 book The Ritual Spring Song in the West and With the Slavic Peoples (Весенняя обрядовая песня на Западе и у славян) won him the Lomonosov Prize in 1907. His magnum opus Paganism and Ancient Rus (Язычество и Древняя Русь) came out in 1914.

Anichkov's numerous critical essays (on Maxim Gorky, Leonid Andreyev, Valery Bryusov, Konstantin Balmont and Fyodor Sologub among others) came out in two acclaimed collections, Literary Images and Ideas (Литературные образы и мнения, 1904) and The Forefathers and the Contemporariries in the Western and Russian Literatures (Предтечи и современники на Западе и у нас, 1910). He also edited the Complete Works by N.A. Dobrolyubov (in 9 volumes, 1911—1913), and authored numerous articles for the Brockhaus and Efron Encyclopedic Dictionary.

Anichkov taught at the Bestuzhev Courses for women, as well as the Saint Petersburg University where in 1902-1917 he was the head of the Western Literatures department. A respected Shakespearean scholar, he regularly visited Great Britain (where at Oxford University he read lectures on Slavic folklore and Russian mythology), as well as France. In Paris, with Maksim Kovalevsky, he co-founded the Russian High School of Social Studies.

The 1917 Revolution found him in France where he stayed for a while before moving in 1918 to Yugoslavia, to lecture at the Belgrade and Skopje Universities. His book The New Russian Poetry (Новая русская поэзия), an extensive survey of the book on Russian Symbolism, Acmeism and Futurism, came out in Berlin in 1923. It was followed by Christianity and Ancient Rus (Христианство и Древняя Русь, Prague, 1924).
