= Elpidifor Barsov =

Elpidifor Vasilyevich Barsov
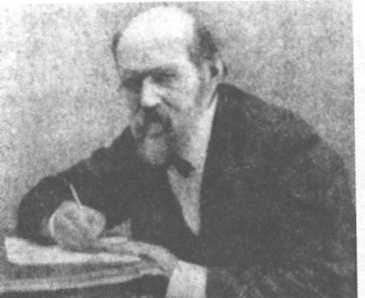
- Born: Елпидифор Васильевич Барсов; 13 November 1836; Nizhny Novgorod Governorate, Russian Empire
- Died: 15 April 1917 (aged 80); Moscow, Russia
- Occupations: literary historian, ethnographer, folklorist, archeologist

Elpidifor Vasilyevich Barsov (Russian: Елпидифор Васильевич Барсов, 13 November 1836 — 15 April 1917) was a Russian literary historian, ethnographer, folklorist, archeologist and philologist, specializing in the ancient Russian written language. Barsov, a member of the Saint Petersburg Imperial Academy of Sciences (1873), and Moscow Imperial Archeological society (1874) was the owner of the country's largest palaeographic collection, as well as numerous priceless documents concerning the history of Raskol in Russia and the Old Believers' literature. Barsov published several acclaimed books, including Peter the Great in the Legends of the Northern Krai (1872), The Old Russian Tsars and Princes in the Northern Krai Legends (1877) and The Northern Krai Lamentations (1872–1885), the latter introducing the readership to the previously unknown genre of the regional Russian folklore.
