= Paraskeva Friday =

Image based on personification of Friday

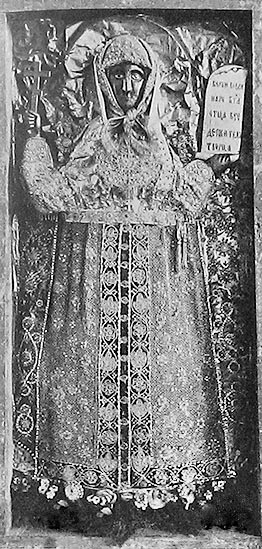
- Saint Paraskeva-Friday, Galich, Russia, photo before 1917
- Venerated in: Folk Orthodoxy
- Influences: Priyah, Freyja, Mokosh

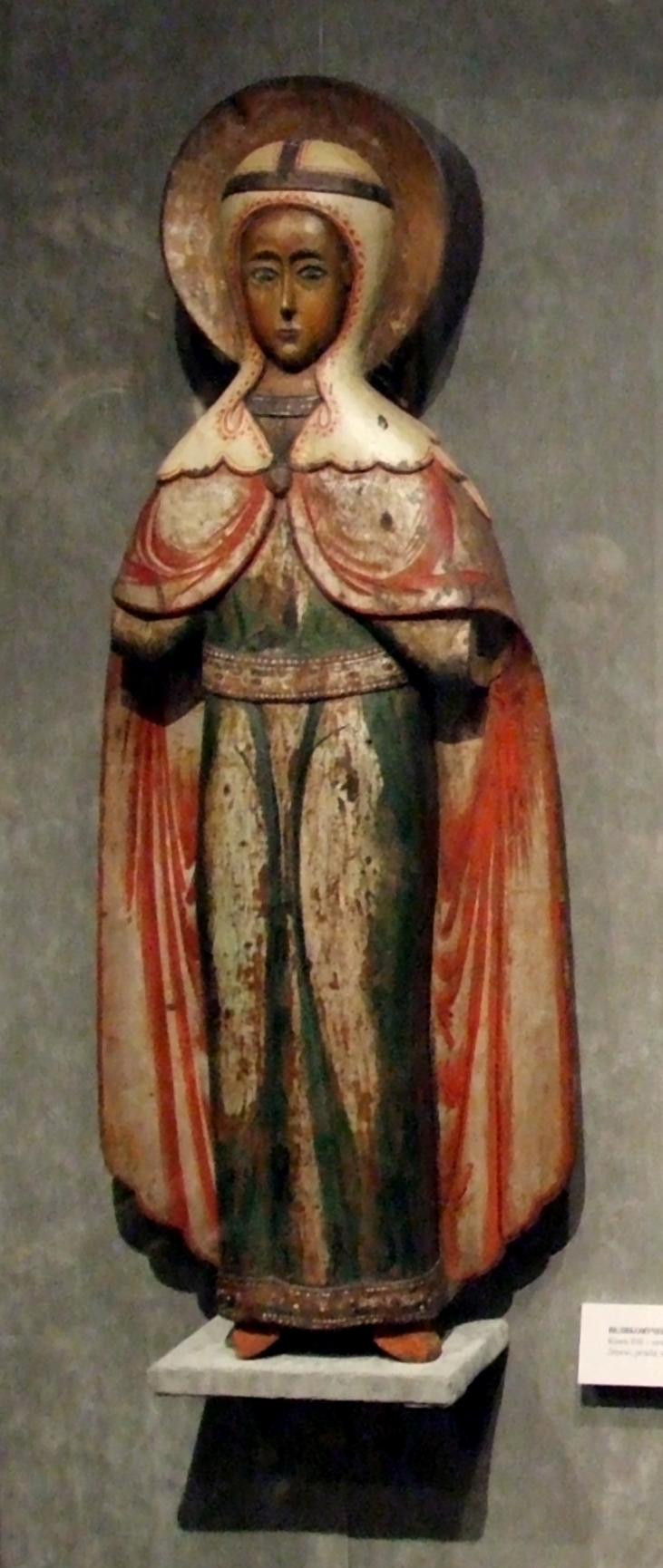
Wooden sculpture of St. Paraskeva. Late seventeenth - early eighteenth century

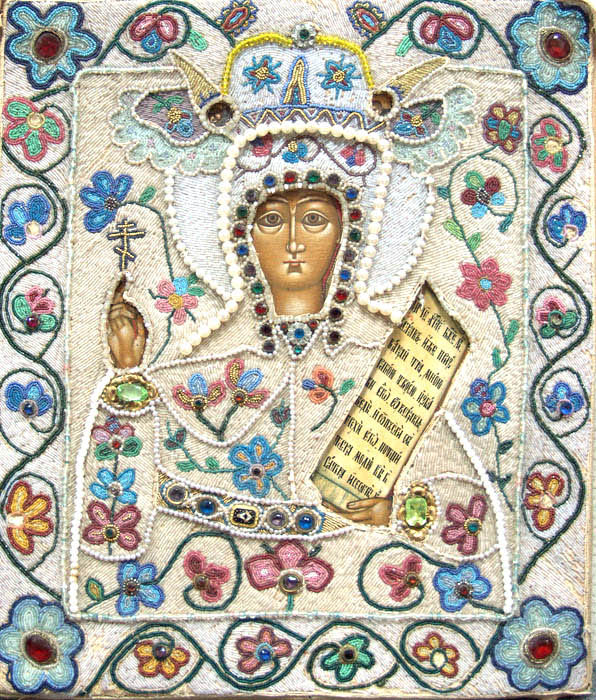
Icon "Paraskeva Pyatnitsa" in a riza. The Urals, circa 1800

In the folk Christianity of Slavic Eastern Orthodox Christians, Paraskeva Friday is a mythologized image based on a personification of Friday as the day of the week and the cult of saints Paraskeva of Iconium, called Friday and Paraskeva of the Balkans. In folk tradition, the image of Paraskeva Friday correlates with the image of Saint Anastasia of the Lady of Sorrows, and the Saint Nedelya as a personified image of Sunday. Typologically, Paraskeva Pyatnitsa has parallels with day-personifications of other cultures, for example, the Tajik Bibi-Seshanbi ('Lady Tuesday').

== Etymology ==
The word paraskeva (Greek: παρασκευη, Greek pronunciation: [/pa.ɾa.sceˈvi/]) means "preparation [for the Sabbath]".

== Image ==
A story about the icon of Paraskeva Pyatnitsa, Museum of Fine Arts of the Republic of Karelia

Canonical image of Saint Paraskeva. Fifteenth-century icon, Vologda Museum

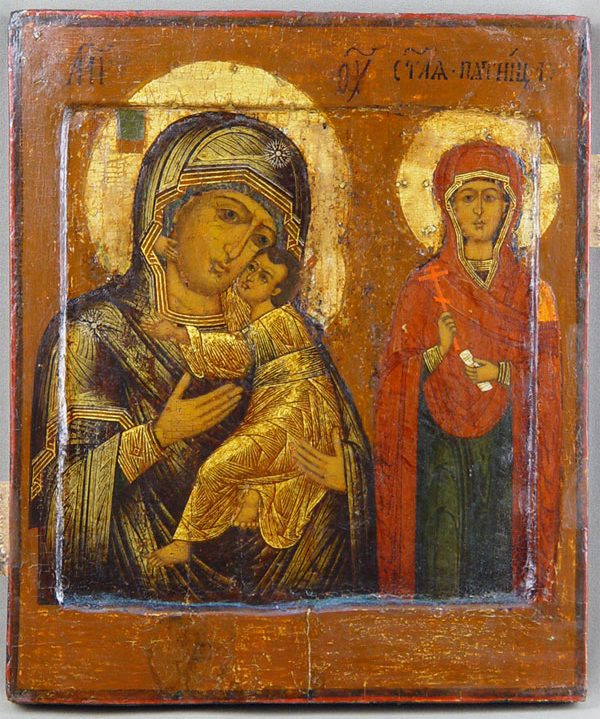
Icon "Our Lady of Grace and Saint Paraskeva Friday", 17th century

The image of Paraskeva Pyatnitsa according to folk beliefs is different from the iconographic image, where she is depicted as an ascetic-looking woman in a red maforiya. The carved icon of Paraskeva Pyatnitsa from the village of Illyeshi is widely known. It is revered in the Russian Orthodox Church as a miracle worker and is housed in the Trinity Cathedral of the Alexander Nevsky Lavra in St. Petersburg.

The most common idol was the sculpture of Paraskeva Pyatnitsa – not only for Russians, but also for neighbouring peoples. The folklorist A. F. Mozharovsky writing in 1903, (Note: According to Mozharovsky:... на придорожныя часовенки-пятницы ставятся иконы св. Параскевы. Теперь это такъ, но было время, что въ часовенки въ инородческихъ мѣст-ностяхъ ставились рѣзныя изображенія изъ дерева грубой работы св. Параскевы и Николая угодника. Они были одѣты въ соотвѣтственныя облаченія. Николай Чудотворецъ въ свя тительскія ризы, а великомученица Параскева была одѣта въ тз'ник\' христіанки первыхъ вѣковъ изъ бѣлаго холста и закрашена разными самотканными убрз'сами, поясами и т. п. Къ часовнямъ приходили мѣстные инородцы: чз'ваши, черемисы, мордва, вотяки, мещеры и даже рзт сскіе. Они з'сердно молились иконамъ рѣзнымъ, ставили свѣчи, жертвовали деньги, клали яйца и вѣшали полотенца. Такія рѣзныя изображенія святой Параскевы и Николая Чудотворца еще и нынѣ можно видѣть въ каменныхъ часовняхъ на торговыхъ плоиіадяхъ въ г.г. Козмодемьянскѣ, Чебоксарахъ, въ селѣ Остолоповѣ, Казанской губ., и другихъ. чѣстахъ. Всѣ рѣзныя изображенія святыхъ Параскевы и Николая носятъ общее названіе пятницъ. — Mozharovsky (1902). pp. 25–26 Translation:... [I]cons of St. Paraskeva are placed on roadside chapels on Fridays. This is true now, but there was a time when roughly carved wooden images of St. Paraskeva and St. Nicholas were placed in chapels in foreign areas. They were dressed in appropriate vestments. Nicholas the Wonderworker in priestly vestments, and the Great Martyr Paraskeva was dressed in the Christian attire of the first centuries made of white linen and covered with various homespun ornaments, belts, etc. Local foreigners came to the chapels: the Chzvashi, Cheremis, Mordvins, Votyaks, Meshchers, and even Russians. They prayed fervently to the carved icons, lit candles, donated money, laid eggs, and hung towels. Such carved images of Saint Paraskeva and Saint Nicholas the Wonderworker can still be seen today in stone chapels on trading squares in the cities of Kozmodemyansk, Cheboksary, in the village of Ostolopovo, Kazan province, and other places. All carved images of Saints Paraskeva and Nicholas bear the common name of Fridays. — English translation) noted that in the chapels "in foreign areas" there were "roughly carved wooden images of Saints Paraskeva and Nicholas ... All carved images of Saints Paraskeva and Nicholas have the common name of Pyatnits ['Friday']". Sculptures were widespread among the Russians. According to a 1908 historical sketch of Sevsk, Dmitrovsk and Komaritskaya volost by Svyatsky, commonly, Paraskeva were: "a painted wooden statue of Pyatnitsa, sometimes in the form of a woman in oriental attire, and sometimes in the form of a simple woman in poneva [traditional skirt] and lapti [bast shoes] ... placed in churches in special cabinets and people prayed before this image".

The popular imagination sometimes gave Paraskeva Friday demonic features: tall stature, long loose hair, large breasts, which she throws behind her back, which brings her closer to the female mythological characters like Dola, Death, and Rusalka (mermaid).

== Depictions and traditions ==
For East Slavs, Paraskeva Friday is a personified representation of the day of the week. She was called Linyanitsa, Paraskeva Pyatnitsa, Paraskeva Lyanyanikha, Nenila Linyanitsa. Paraskeva Friday was dedicated 27 [O.S. ] October as Paraskeva Muddyha Day and [O.S. ] 10 November as Day of Paraskeva the Flaxwoman. In the church, these days commemorate Paraskeva of the Balkans and Paraskeva of Iconium, respectively. On these days, no spinning, washing, or ploughing was done so as not to "dust the Paraskeva or to clog her eyes." It was believed that if the ban was violated, she could inflict disease. One of the decrees of the Stoglav Synod (1551) is devoted to the condemnation of such superstitions:

Yes, by pogosts and by the villages walk false prophets, men and wives, and maidens, and old women, naked and barefoot, and with their hair straight and loose, shaking and being killed. And they say that they are Saint Friday and Saint Anastasia and that they command them to command the canons of the church. They also command the peasants in Wednesday and in Friday not to do manual labour, and to wives not to spin, and not to wash clothes, and not to kindle stones.

According to beliefs, Paraskeva Friday also oversees the observance of other Friday prohibitions, including washing laundry, bleaching canvases, and combing hair. In the stories Paraskeva Pyatnitsa spins the kudel left by the mistress, punishes the woman who violated the ban, tangles the thread, maybe skin the offending woman, takes away her eyesight, turns her into a frog, or throws forty spindles into the window with orders to strain them until morning.

There was a ritual of "driving Pyatnitsa" documented in the 18th century: "In Small Russia, in the Starodubsky regiment on a holiday day they drive a plain-haired woman named Pyatnitsa, and they drive her in the church and at church people honour her with gifts and with the hope of some benefit". Until the 19th century, the custom of "leading (driving) Pyatnitsa" – a woman with loose hair – was preserved in Ukraine.

Among Ukrainians there was a belief that Friday walks were littered with needles and spindles of negligent hosts who did not honour the saint and her days.

In bylichki and spiritual verses, Paraskeva Pyatnitsa complains that she is not honoured by not observing the Friday prohibitions – they prick her with spindles, spin her hair, clog her eyes with kostra (shives). The icons depict Paraskeva Friday with spokes or spindles sticking out of her chest (compare with images of Our Lady of the Seven Spears or Softening of the Evil Hearts).

In eastern Slavic cultures, wooden sculptures of Paraskeva Pyatnitsa were also placed on wells, sacrifices were brought to her. The sacrifices, emblematic of women's work, might be clothes, kudel (long bundle of fibre for spinning), threads, and sheep's wool; these were thrown down a well. The rite was called mokrida, which may allude to Mokosh.

The Russians prayed to Paraskeva Pyatnitsa for protection against the death of livestock, especially cows. The saint was also considered the healer of human ailments, especially devil's obsession, fever, toothache, headache, and other ailments.

=== Ninth Friday ===
The celebration of the ninth Friday after Easter was widespread among Russians. In Solikamsk, the miraculous deliverance of the city from the invasion of Nogais and Voguls in 1547 was remembered on this day.

In Nikolsky County, Vologda province, on the ninth Friday there was a custom to "build a customary linen": the girls would come together, rub the flax, spin and weave the linen in a day.

For the Komi peoples, the ninth Friday was called the "Covenant Day of the Sick" (Komi: Zavetnoy lun vysysyaslӧn). It was believed that on this day the miracle-working icon of Paraskeva Pyatnitsa (Komi: Paraskeva-Peknicha) from the chapel in the village of Krivoy Navolok could bring healing to the sick. There is still a tradition of crucession to the Ker-yu river, where elderly women and girls wash temple and home icons in the waters blessed with the icon of Paraskeva Pyatnitsa. The water is considered holy for three days after the feast and is collected and taken away with them. Dipping icons in standing water was considered a sin.

== In folk calendars ==
Among the South Slavs, the day of 27 [O.S. 14] October is celebrated everywhere.

In some regions of Serbia and Bosnia, they also celebrate 8 August [O.S. 26 July], called in Serbian: Petka Trnovska, Petka Trnovka, and in Macedonian: Trnovka Petka, Mlada Petka, Petka Vodonosha. In Bulgarian Thrace, St. Petka is dedicated to the Friday after Easter, and in Serbia, the Friday (Požega) before St. Evdokija Day (14 [O.S. 1] March).

In Bulgarian it is known as Petkovden, St. Petka, Petka, or Pejcinden. In Macedonian: Petkovden; and in Serbian: Petkovica, Petkovaca, Sveta Paraskeva, Sveta Petka, Pejcindan.

== See also ==
- Deities and fairies of fate in Slavic mythology
- Lauma
- Folk Orthodoxy
