= Etymological Dictionary of Slavic Languages =

Etymological Dictionary of Slavic Languages. Proto-Slavic Lexical Stock
- ESSJa, volume 35
- Author: Oleg Trubachev, Anatoly Zhuravlev et al.
- Language: Russian
- Subject: Proto-Slavic language
- Published: 1974 Наука
- Publication place: Russia
- Media type: Print (Hardcover)

The Etymological Dictionary of Slavic Languages: Proto-Slavic Lexical Stock (Russian: Этимологический словарь славянских языков. Праславянский лексический фонд / Etimologicheskiy slovar' slavyanskikh yazykov. Praslavyanskiy leksicheskiy fond, abbreviated ESSJa / Russian: ЭССЯ) is an etymological dictionary of the reconstructed Proto-Slavic lexicon. It has been continuously published since 1974 until present, in 43 volumes, making it one of the most comprehensive in the world.

== History ==
The dictionary was conceived in the 1950s with the inadequacy of the existing Slavic etymological dictionaries in mind. Since 1961 the preparations began for the dictionary under the direction of Oleg Trubachev at the Russian Language Institute of the Russian Academy of Sciences in the USSR. In 1963 a trial edition of the dictionary was published. Since its inception, the dictionary has been published by the Department of Etymology and Onomastics of the Russian Language Institute.

The Editor-In-Chief in the period 1974—2002 was Oleg Trubachev. Trubachev died in 2002, at which point the role was taken up by Anatoly Zhuravlyov. Zhuravlev was the editor until vol. 40 (2016), which was co-edited by him and Zhanna Varbot, who has continued editing the following volumes.

== The dictionary ==
For every Proto-Slavic reconstruction an etymology is given, as well as the history of etymological research. Reflexes in all Slavic languages are listed, and so are the cognates in other Indo-European languages. Proto-Slavic accent and accentual paradigm is not reconstructed. Elements of Proto-Slavic morphology (affixes, desinences) are also not reconstructed. Over 2100 journals and books have been used while writing the published volumes of the dictionary. The complete dictionary is estimated to contain around 20 000 words.

== List of volumes ==
Issue	Title	Articles in the issue	Allpages	Print run	Year	ISBN, УДК, ББК
[0]	[проспект]	—N/a	94	300	1963	
1	*a — *besědьlivъ	466	214	6500	1974	
2	*bez — *bratrъ	624	238	6500	1975	
3	*bratrьсь — *cьrky	583	199	6600	1976	
4	*čaběniti — *děl’a	565	235	6550	1977	
5	*dělo — *dьržьlь	588	232	6000	1978	
6	*e — *golva	526	222	5550	1979	
7	*golvačь — *gyžati	485	224	5200	1980	
8	*xa — *jьvlьga	560	252	5250	1981	
9	*jьz — *klenьje	494	197	5350	1983	
10	*klepačь — *konь	350	198	4450	1983	
11	*konьсь — *kotьna(ja)	336	220	4150	1984	
12	*koulъkъ — *kroma / *kromъ	389	186	4300	1985	
13	*kroměžirъ — *kyžiti	730	285	4650	1987	
14	*labati — *lěteplъjь	599	268	5300	1987	
15	*lětina — *lokač	641	263	4800	1988	ISBN 5-02-010862-6, ББК 81-4 Э 90
16	*lokadlo — *lъživьсь	623	264	3100	1990	ISBN 5-02-010920-7, ББК 81 Э90
17	*lъžь — *matješьnъjь	569	269	3250	1990	ISBN 5-02-010995-9, ББК 81-4 Э 90
18	*matoga — *mękyšъka	559	254	2500	1992	ISBN 5-02-011039-6, ББК 81-4 Э 90
19	*męs^{(}’^{)}arь — *morzakъ	578	255	1535	1992	ISBN 5-02-011121-X, ББК 81-4 Э 90
20	*morzatъjь — *mъrsknǫti	572	256	3000	1994	ISBN 5-02-011145-7, ББК 81-4 Э 90
21	*mъrskovatъjь — *nadějьnъjь	679	236	3000	1994	ISBN 5-02-011172-4, ББК 81-4 Э 90
22	*naděliti — *narodъ	725	255	3000	1995	ISBN 5-02-011252-6, ББК 81-4 Э 90
23	*nаrоdьnъjь — *nаvijаkъ	507	239	3000	1996	ISBN 5-02-011214-3, ББК 81-4 Э 90
24	*navijati(sę) / *navivati(sę) — *nerodimъ(jь)	628	234	2000	1997	ISBN 5-02-011206-2, УДК 800/801, ББК 81-4 Э 90
25	*neroditi — *novotьnъ(jь)	615	238	2000	1999	ISBN 5-02-011672-6, УДК 800/801, ББК 81-4 Э 90
26	*novoukъ(jь) — *obgorditi	587	237	1000	1999	ISBN 5-02-011590-8, УДК 800/801, ББК 81.2-3 Э-90
27	*obgordja / *obgordjь — *oblězati	602	247	1500	2000	ISBN 5-02-011793-5, УДК 800/801, ББК 81.2-3 Э-90
28	*oblězti — *obpovědanьje	694	266	1500	2001	ISBN 5-02-022627-0, УДК 800/801, ББК 81.2-3 Э-90
29	*obpovědati — *obsojьnica	562	266	1360	2002	ISBN 978-5-02-011808-9, УДК 800/801, ББК 81.2-3 Э90
30	*obsojьnikъ — *obvedьnъjь	825	269	1360	2003	ISBN 5-02-006386-X, УДК 800/801, ББК 81.2-3 Э90
31	*obvelčenьje — *obžьniviny	503	258	1450	2005	ISBN 5-02-033251-8, УДК 811.16(038), ББК 81.2-4 Э90
32	*obžьnъ — *orzbotati	519	261	1650	2005	ISBN 5-02-033868-0, УДК 811.16(38), ББК 81.2-4 Э90
33	*orzbotěti — *orzmajati(sę)	623	388	1500	2007	ISBN 5-02-035689-1, УДК 811.16(38), ББК 81.224 Э90
34	*orzmajь — *orzstegajь	901	307	1050	2008	ISBN 978-5-02-036286-4, УДК 811.16/38, ББК 81.2-4 Э90
35	*orzstegati(sę) — *orzъjьti(sę)	368	233	960	2009	ISBN 978-5-02-036883-5, УДК 811.16/38, ББК 81.2-4 Э90
36	*orz(ъ)zeleněti / *orz(ъ)zeleniti — *otъgrěbati(sę)	419	260	1000	2010	ISBN 978-5-02-037371-6, УДК 811.16/38, ББК 81.2-4 Э90
37	*otъgryzati(sę) — *otъpasti	364	250	900	2011	ISBN 978-5-02-037516-1, УДК 811.16/38, ББК 81.2-4 Э90
38	*otъpečatati / *otъpečatiti(sę) — *otъtęgnǫti(sę)	431	248	1010	2012	ISBN 978-5-02-037545-1, УДК 811.16/38, ББК 81.2-4 Э90
39	*otъtęti — *ozgǫba	—N/a	242	900	2014	ISBN 978-5-02-039092-8, УДК 811.16/38, ББК 81.2-4 Э90
40	*ǫborъkъ — *pakъla	—N/a	236, [4]	650	2016	ISBN 978-5-02-039954-9, УДК 811.16/38, ББК 81.2-4 Э90
41	*pala — *pažьnъ(jь)	287	278, [2]	300	2018	ISBN 978-5-02-040069-6, УДК 811.16/38, ББК 81.2-4 Э90
42	*peča — *реrzъ	298	343	300	2021	ISBN 978-5-02-040878-4, УДК 811.16/38, ББК 81.2-4 Э90
