= Gagana =

Fantastical bird in Russian folklore

Gagana is a miraculous bird with an iron beak and copper claws featured in Russian folklore. She is said to live on the Buyan Island. The bird is often mentioned in incantations. It is also said this bird guards the Alatyr, alongside Garafena the snake.

Gagana knows how to conjure and work miracles and, if she is asked correctly, can help a person. This bird is also the only one capable of giving the milk of the birds.

== Background ==
The bird Gagana is possibly attested in a tale compiled by author A. A. Erlenwein, and translated by Angelo de Gubernatis in his Florilegio with the name Vaniúsha, where the hero's sisters marry a bear, an iron-nosed bird ("uccello dal naso di ferro") and a pike ("luccio"). The "bird with iron beak" appears to be a creature that inhabits several Slavic folktales.

William Ralston Shedden-Ralston, citing Alexander Afanasyev's notes on Slavic folklore, writes that on the mythical island of Buyan there lives "The Tempest Bird", "the oldest and largest of all the birds", said to possess "an iron beak" and "copper claws".
