= Alatyr (mythology) =

Magic stone in Russian mythology

The Alatyr is a sacred stone in Russian folklore. It is the "father to all stones", the navel of the earth, containing sacred letters and endowed with healing properties. Although the name Alatyr appears only in East Slavic sources, the awareness of the existence of such a stone exists in various parts of the Slavdom. It is often mentioned in stories and referred to in love spells as "a mighty force that has no end."

In the Dove Book, the Alatyr is associated with an altar located in the "navel of the world", in the middle of the world ocean, on the Buyan island. On it stands the World tree. The stone is endowed with healing and magical properties. Spiritual verses describe how "from under the white-alatyr-stone" flows a miraculous source that gives the whole world "food and healing." The Alatyr is guarded by the wise snake Garafena and the bird Gagana.

== Etymology ==
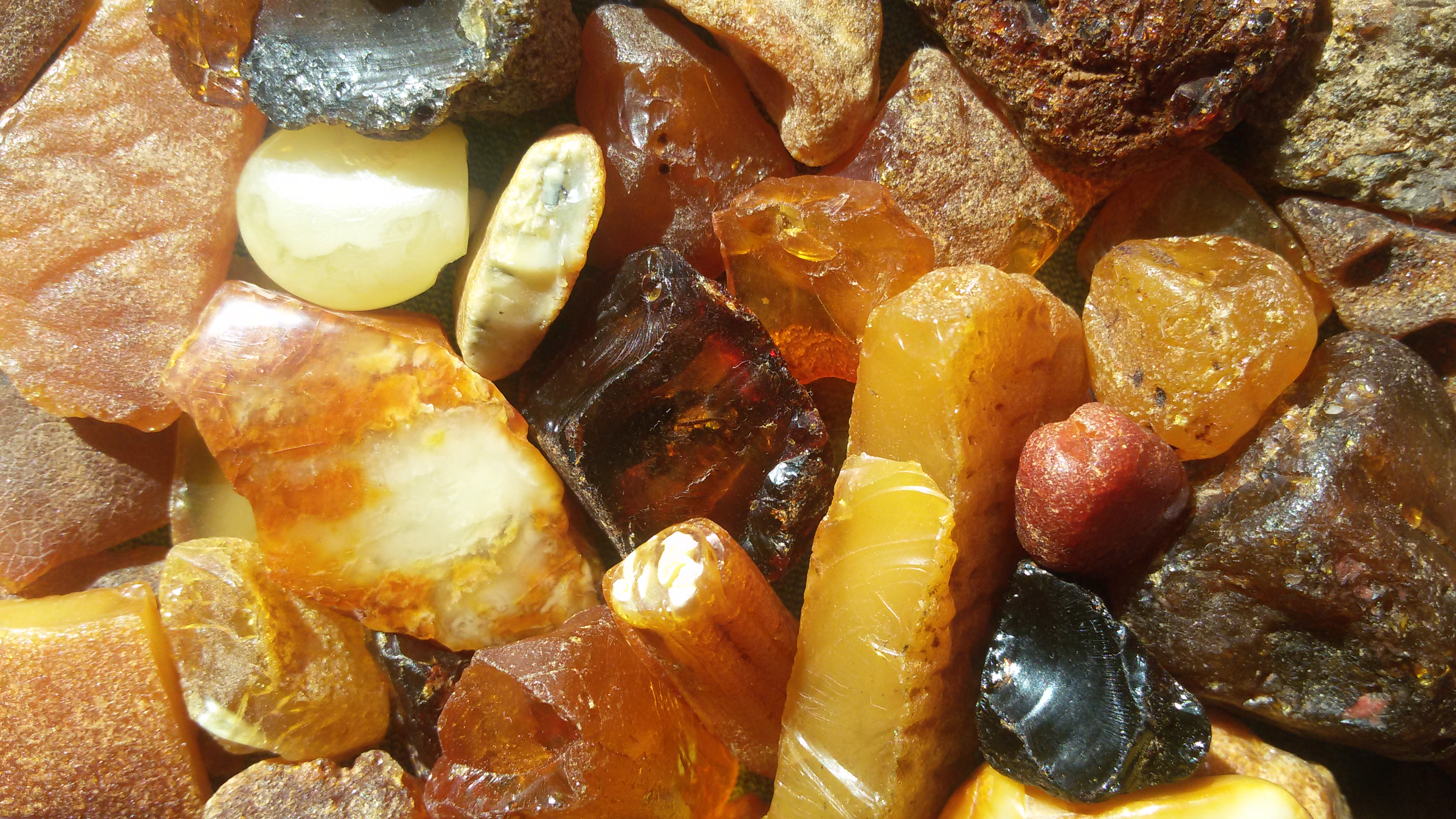
The color of the Baltic amber varies from white to brown.

The stone is usually called Alatyr (Russian: Алатырь), Alabor (Russian: ала́бор), Alabyr (Russian: ала́бы́рь) or Latyr (Russian: ла́тырь) and sometimes white stone or blue stone. Alatyr has an uncertain etymology. The name has been compared to the word "altar" and to the town of Alatyr. According to Oleg Trubachyov, the word alatyr is of Slavic origin and is related to the Russian word for amber: янтарь yantar. According to Viktor Martynov, the word alatyr derives from the Iranic *al-atar, literally "white-burning", and the epithet the white stone is a calque of the stone's original name.

According to Roman Jakobson in a review of Max Vasmer's Etymological Dictionary of the Russian Language:

The most precious and miraculous stone (stone for all stones) of Russian folklore, "alatyr" or "latir" is undoubtedly an alternation of the word "latygor" (derived from Latgalia) and means a Latvian stone, which is to say, amber.

== In literature ==
In Russian folklore it is a sacred stone, the “father to all stones”, the navel of the earth, containing sacred letters and endowed with healing properties. Although the name Alatyr appears only in East Slavic sources, the awareness of the existence of such a stone exists in various parts of the Slavdom. It is often mentioned in stories, and is referred to in love spells as "a mighty force that has no end."

In the middle of the blue sea lies the Latyr stone; many sailors sail on the sea, they stop at that stone; they take much medicine from it, they send it all over the wide world. That is why the Latyr sea is the father of seas, That is why the Latyr stone is the father of stones! Russian original text Cреди моря синяго лежит латырь-камень; идут по морю много корабельщиков, у того камня останавливаются; они берут много с него снадобья, посылают по всему свету белому. Потому Латырь-море морям отец, Потому Латырь-камень каменям отец!

Под восточной стороной есть окиан-синее-море, на том окияне на синем море лежит бело-латырь-камень, на том бело-латыре-камне стоит святая золотая церковь, во той золотой церкви стоит свят золот престол, на том злате престоле сидит сам Господь Исус Христос, Михаил-архангел, Гавриил-архангел ...	To the East there is an ocean-blue-sea, on that ocean, on the blue sea, lies the white Latyr-stone, on that white Latyr-stone stands a holy golden church, in that golden church stands a holy golden throne, on that golden throne sits the Lord Jesus Christ himself, Michael the archangel, Gabriel the archangel ...

Dove book

С-под камешка, с-под белого латыря Протекли реки, реки быстрые По всей земле, по всей вселенную — Всему миру на исцеление, Всему миру на пропитание...	From underneath the little stone, from underneath the white Latyr Rivers flowed, swift rivers, All over the earth, all over the universe - To bring healing for the whole world , To bring food for the whole world...

In Polish folk culture and language the stone is located on the borderline of the worlds, beyond the places of human residence. On the stone, things are happening related to change or the state of waiting for it. It symbolizes the center of the world and the transition from one world to another, it is related to the dead and evil spirits. In folklore this stone is named white stone, cerulean stone, grey stone, golden stone, sea stone, heavenly/paradisiac stone, and less often black stone. White stone together with water and a tree is in a sacred place. It is connected with fertility (a girl is waiting on a stone for a boy or waiting with him, waiting for her state to change, lovers are parting, etc.), death (Jesus dies on the stone) and lies somewhere far away (behind the city, behind the village, in paradise). The golden stone occurs mainly in wedding and love songs, less often others and usually occurs with a lily (wedding flower). God's feet are stones on which Jesus, Mary, Mother of God or the saints left their footprints, handprints or traces of objects (e.g. Mary tripped and left a mark on the stone; St. Adalbert taught on the stone and left a trace of footprints). These stones are directly called altars, sacrifices are made on them, are built into churches or church altars; they are considered sacred and have healing powers. In Polish folklore there is also the devil's stone and as such it does not appear in cultures other than Slavic. This stone lies abroad in distant lands, but instead of prosperity brings misfortune. The folklore does not speak about the origin of the stone but about the fact that it was brought by the devil to demolish a church, castle or other building.

== In popular culture ==
- The Legend of the Young Boyar Duke Stepanovich (In that rich India ...) (Duke Stepanovich)

An eagle is sitting on a stone, Whether on a stone on a plate

- Poem by K. D. Balmont, Alatyr Stone (1906)
- Short story by Yevgeny Zamyatin, Alatyr (1914)

Ancient Slav tales tell of "the white burning stone on Buyan", possibly referring to Alatyr.

In Latvian, Belarusian and Russian healing charms, a raven is invoked as a helping animal: it is called upon to take away the disease from the patient, fly away to the ocean and place the illness on a white or gray stone. In a Russian charm, this stone is explicitly called "Latyr-stone".

== See also ==
- Atar
- Foundation Stone
- Blue Stone of Kleshchin

== Bibliography ==
- Bartmiński, Jerzy (1996). Słownik stereotypów i symboli ludowych. Kosmos. 1, Niebo, światła niebieskie, ogień, kamienie [Dictionary of stereotypes and folk symbols. Cosmos. 1, Heaven, heavenly lights, fire, stones] (in Polish). Vol. 1. Lublin: Wydawnictwo Uniwersytetu Marii Curie-Skłodowskiej. ISBN 83-227-0901-3.
- "Голубиная книга". Brockhaus and Efron Encyclopedic Dictionary: In 86 Volumes (82 Volumes and 4 Additional Volumes) (in Russian). St. Petersburg: F. A. Brockhaus. 1890–1907.
- Голубиная книга [Small Brockhaus and Efron Encyclopedic Dictionary]. St. Petersburg. "1907-1909"
- Korinfsky, Apollon (1901). Народная Русь : Круглый год сказаний, поверий, обычаев и пословиц русского народа [Folk Russia: All year round tales, beliefs, customs and proverbs of the Russian people] (in Russian). Izdaniye knigoprodavtsa M. V. Klyukina.
- Meletinsky, E.M., ed. (1990). Алатырь [Alatyr] (in Russian). Советская энциклопедия. p. 333. ISBN 5-85270-032-0.
- Petrukhin, Vladimir (1995). Алатырь [Alatyr]. Moscow: Ėllis Lak. pp. 31–416. ISBN 5-7195-0057-X. OL 586238M.
- Vasmer, Max, ed. (1986). Этимологический словарь русского языка М. Фасмера [Etymological Dictionary of the Russian Language] (in Russian).
