= The Girl in the Tower (novel) =

2017 historical fantasy novel by Katherine Arden

The Girl In The Tower
- First edition
- Author: Katherine Arden
- Language: English
- Series: Winternight trilogy
- Release number: 2nd in series
- Genre: Historical Fantasy
- Publisher: Del Rey
- Publication date: 5 December 2017
- Publication place: United Kingdom
- Pages: 400 (Hardcover Edition); 400 (EBook Edition); 783 minutes (Audio Edition)
- ISBN: 9781101885963
- Preceded by: The Bear and the Nightingale
- Followed by: The Winter of the Witch

The Girl In The Tower is a 2017 historical fantasy novel written by Katherine Arden. It is the second novel in the Winternight trilogy. The Girl In The Tower is set in medieval Russia and incorporates elements of Russian folklore.

== Plot ==
Vasilisa "Vasya" Petrovna has departed her childhood home of Lesnaya Zemlya atop her stallion, Solovey, leaving behind her brothers and her paternal half-sister. She rides through the winter forest until she comes across a solitary house in a fir grove. She is greeted by Morozko, the frost-demon, who ushers her inside.

Meanwhile, in Moscow, Vasya's sister, Olga Vladmimirova, restlessly awaits the return of her brother, Aleksandr "Sasha" Petrovich. In the eight years since she left their small countryside village and became the Princess of Serpukhov, Olga gave birth to two children, a daughter and a son, and is heavily pregnant with her third. Sasha has garnered respect and fame as a great warrior monk of the Orthodox church and advisor to the Grand Prince of Moscow, Dmitrii Ivanovich. In Olga's terem (tower) surrounded by her fellow noblewomen, a woman named Darinka shares a frightening ghost story. As she finishes, Olga's daughter, Marya, cries out, claiming to see the ghost she described.

The following morning, Sasha returns in the company of a sick and injured priest named Konstantin Nikonovich whom he found on his journey back to Moscow. Sasha informs his sister that Tatar bandits are burning villages and kidnapping girls. Desperate to put an end to this madness, he seeks to council the Grand Prince. Konstantin awakens and informs Olga that he has travelled from her childhood home. He shares the news that both her father and stepmother are dead, killed by a bear foolishly provoked by her younger sister. He claims that Vasya, whom he calls a witch, fled into the frozen forest and must also be dead.

A boyar with flaming red hair named Kasyan Lutovich arrives in Moscow with a report that bolsters Sasha's claims. Convinced, Dmitrii rides out with Sasha and Kasyan to investigate. The party comes across burnt villages and are informed that girls have indeed been kidnapped. Kasyan sets off to gather more men, promising to reunite with them at Sasha's home, Trinity Lavra monastery. When Sasha and the Grand Prince arrive, they find it already filled with refugees fleeing the bandits. They are stunned when a rider on a great bay stallion appears at the monastery gate with three rescued girls, warning that bandits are in pursuit. Despite having been separated for 8 years, Sasha is quick to recognize the rider as his sister, Vasya, disguised as a boy.

The story returns to the night Vasya fled her village and sought refuge with Morozko. The frost-demon expresses frustration at her recklessness, insisting that she return home and find her place among her people. Vasya reveals her desire to see the world, asking only that Morozko gift her the warm clothes and silver he once offered as her dowry. Morozko cautions that the wilderness is not a safe place for a lone girl, but in the end he respects her wishes and provides her with generous provisions. Before her departure, he makes her promise to never remove the sapphire pendant.

On the road with Solovey, Vasya briefly shares her camp with a chyert she calls Midnight. She reaches the town of Chudovo and, dressed as a boy, has a brief encounter with Kasyan. Not long after, she is attacked by two men in a bathhouse and narrowly escapes thanks to the bannik and a sudden, unnatural snowstorm. In the wake of this altercation, Vasya falls gravely ill. Morozko only intervenes when she is near death. He heals her with the power of the necklace and provides her with shelter and food. Later, his white mare chastises his inability to leave Vasya to her fate, confirming that he harbours affection for the girl. He spends a few more days with Vasya during which he teaches her to fight with a dagger so she might better defend herself.

Following Morozko's departure, Vasya discovers a smouldering village. The survivors inform her that bandits kidnapped three girls, and Vasya resolves to rescue them. The village's domovoi (house spirit) provides her with a magic glowing coal to track the bandits. She locates their camp and, after killing a raider using the dagger gifted to her by Morozko, hauls the girls onto Solovey's back. The chyert Midnight "Polunochnitsa" directs Vasya toward Trinity Lavra monastery.

At the Lavra, Sasha begrudgingly aids Vasya in maintaining her disguise. She calls herself Vasili Petrovich, claiming to be Sasha's younger brother. Impressed by her bravery, Dmitrii insists she guide them back to the bandits' camp. Kasyan arrives with his men, and the party sets upon the raiders. During the battle, Sasha witnesses a white mare and her rider protecting Vasya.

Vasya, Dmitrii, Sasha and Kasyan return to Moscow, where Olga agrees to help Vasya maintain her disguise. She confronts Konstantin, growing suspicious of the verity of his claims surrounding Pyotr and Anna's deaths. As Vasili, Vasya attends a feast with Dmitrii, where she recognizes the new Tatar ambassador, Chelubey, as the surviving bandit leader from the camp. The following day, Vasya meets Olga's daughter, Marya, who reveals that she shares Vasya's gift to see and speak with fantastical creatures. Vasya sways Marya against fearing her powers, suggesting instead that she use them to keep the chyerti of her abode nourished and strong. Marya also informs her that the tower is haunted by a ghost.

Riding with Kasyan through Moscow, Vasya is confronted by Chelubey. Vasya wagers that she can calm a spirited filly he has just purchased. Using her ability to speak with horses, Vasya wins and names the horse Zima. Witnessing the spectacle, Kasyan challenges Vasya to a horse race. Confident that Solovey's speed outmatches any mortal horse, Vasya accepts. That night, she attends a feast honouring Maslenitsa - the festivities that mark the farewell to winter. Morozko appears, inviting Vasya on a ride through Moscow's empty streets. He warns her of a "shadow over Moscow" before the two share a deeply passionate kiss. As always, he remains cryptic about his feelings for her and disappears.

The following day, Kasyan arrives for the race on a magnificent golden mare named Zolotaya. He briefly takes the lead, but Solovey is able to keep up. Just as Vasya is about to win, Kasyan tears off Vasya's hood, exposing her long hair. He seizes her and publicly humiliates her by ripping her shirt open, confirming that Vasili is a girl. A furious and betrayed Dmitrii orders Sasha arrested for his part in the deception and has Vasya imprisoned in Olga's terem. Meanwhle, Kasyan visits Konstantin and enlists him in a plot.

Morozko reveals that Kasyan is actually the immortal sorcerer, Kaschei the Deathless. Growing weary of the frost-demon's veiled messages and meaningless affection, Vasya refuses his offer to help her escape the tower, unwilling to abandon her brother and sister. Later, Kasyan visits her and expresses his desire to marry her. Seeing the sapphire pendant, he spitefully shares what Morozko would not: that the necklace is a talisman of the frost-demon created to bind his power and memory to its wearer - whom Kasyan calls his "slave" - in order to halt his fading influence.

Soon after, Olga goes into labour. Morozko is summoned during the birth in his role as the death-god. Aware of what his presence signifies, a delirious Vasya attempts to fight him off. Morozko is shocked when she miraculously accompanies her sister to the twilit road between life and death. Forced to choose between her life and unborn daughter's, Olga insists that Morozko take her. Vasya's intervention, however, strips Olga of her choice. The baby is stillborn. Konstantin, who had been hastened to the bathhouse birthing chamber to baptize mother or child, denounces Vasya as a witch. She flees.

Beside herself with grief, Vasya at last confronts Morozko, demanding the truth about the sapphire pendant. He echoes Kasyan's claims. Feeling used, she destroys the necklace, severing their bond. Meanwhile, Kasyan manipulates Konstantin into kidnapping Marya for her magical sight. Vasya rushes to the monastery for Sasha's aid. Together, they race to Dmitrii's palace, which is under siege by Kasyan and Chelubey's forces. Desperate to save Solovey, Zima and the other horses in the stable, Vasya removes the ensorcelled bridle from Kasyan's mare, who abruptly transforms into a Zhar Ptitsa (Firebird) and sets the city ablaze.

Dmitrii forgives Sasha, and they rally defenders. Vasya, meanwhile, flees the fire to the tower to rescue Marya. There, she confronts Kasyan, and the ghost of her grandmother, Tamara, appears. Vasya recognizes that Kasyan's immortality is linked to the ghost's life force, as they were once madly in love. Vasya destroys the jewel containing their shared life, killing Kasyan and allowing Tamara to be at peace.

Vasya escapes the tower with Marya only to find the whole of Moscow burning. She makes a frantic appeal to Midnight, demanding to know how she can save the city. Polunochnitsa reveals that Morozko may have had the capacity, but with the pendant broken, he can now only appear to the dying. Vasya willingly runs into the flames alone to summon Morozko. In the starlit forest between life and death, she confronts him and proves that their bond runs deeper than the broken trinket by using her love to pull him back into the physical world. Morozko summons a great snowstorm that smothers the flames. The storm marks the end of winter and as dawn breaks, Morozko fades away.

Vasya returns to Olga's palace. The siblings reconcile, and Vasya tells them the full truth about her powers, what happened in Lesnaya Zemlya and Morozko. Despite grief over Vasya having stripped her of her choice to save her unborn daughter, Olga accepts. The siblings unite with a new purpose: to protect Marya, who shares Vasya’s sight.

== Major characters ==
- Vasilisa "Vasya" Petrovna: a young woman who is able to see fantastical creatures that are invisible to most people. Having fled her childhood home, she now travels disguised as a boy with aspirations of discovering the wider world. Her relationship with Morozko becomes increasingly fraught as she challenges his expectations of her.
- Morozko: the winter and death-demon who ferries away the departed and sometimes rewards the brave with riches. Morozko created the sapphire pendant in the hopes that one of Vasya's bloodline would wear it and remember him, a failsafe to prevent his power from fading. In doing so, Morozko develops a tenuous devotion to Vasya. He lends his guidance and protection while navigating his role as an immortal chyert.
- Solovey: Vasya's magical horse, a gift from Morozko. He is a great bay stallion with a white star on his forehead.
- Konstantin Nikonovich: a handsome and charismatic priest of the Orthodox church. Konstantin developed a feverish obsession with Vasya during his harbour in Lesnaya Zemlya. Despite the fact that she saved him from chyerti on several occasions, his hatred for her is tinged with lust and shame.
- Kasyan Lutovich: the immortal Sorcerer Kaschei the Deathless disguised as a Russian boyer. He was once in love with Vasya's maternal grandmother, Tamara, and bound his life-force to her spirit in order to live forever. He enslaves a magical golden mare who is revealed to be the Firebird.
- Olga Vladimirova: Vasya's elder sister and Princess of Serpukhov.
- Aleksandr "Sasha" Peresvet: Vasya's elder brother and a warrior monk of the Orthodox church.
- Marya Morevna: Olga's firstborn and Vasya's niece. Marya shares Vasya's gift to see and speak with the chyerti, a power that will eventually put her at odds with her family and community.
- Polunochnitsa "Midnight": a chyert with ambiguous allegiances who offers Vasya cryptic advice.
