= The Winter of the Witch =

2019 historical fantasy novel by Katherine Arden

- First edition
- Author: Katherine Arden
- Language: English
- Series: Winternight trilogy
- Release number: 3rd in series
- Genre: Historical Fantasy
- Publisher: Del Ray
- Publication date: October 1, 2019
- Publication place: United Kingdom
- Pages: 400 (Hardcover Edition); 400 (EBook Edition); 840 minutes (Audio Edition)
- ISBN: 9781101885963
- Preceded by: The Girl in the Tower

The Winter of the Witch is a 2019 historical fantasy novel written by Katherine Arden. It is the third novel in the Winternight trilogy. The Winter of the Witch is set in medieval Russia and incorporates elements of Russian folklore.

== Plot ==
Moscow lies beneath a blanket of fresh snow, having survived both fire and siege. While surveying the wreckage of the palace stable, the Grand Prince, Dmitrii Ivanovich, and Vasya's brother, Aleksandr "Sasha" Peresvet, discover a golden bridle. Unbeknownst to them, the bridle was used by Kasyan to enslave the mare that transformed into the Firebird and set the city ablaze. Dmitrii locks the valuable artifact away in his treasure-room.

Father Konstantin Nikonovich, the priest consumed by years of hatred and desire for Vasya, channels Moscow's grief into rage by accusing her setting the city on fire using witchcraft. A mob descends on the tower of Vasya's elder sister, Olga Vladimirova. To protect her family, Vasya attempts to sneak out of the city unseen. However, her horse, Solovey, bursts from the stable to carry her to safety, resulting in the stallion breaking his leg. Konstantin cuts Solovey's throat, killing him. Morozko, who previously expended the last of his influence to smother the blaze in Moscow with a magic snowstorm, appears in the form of the death-god for Solovey. Vasya, beaten unconscious by the mob, is dragged to the frozen river and locked in a cage atop a pyre.

As fire consumes the pyre, desperation awakens dormant magic in Vasya. She tears apart the burning bars and leaps through the flames, landing unseen, having unknowingly made herself invisible. Suddenly, Medved the Bear appears, revealing that Morozko has freed him from his centuries of imprisonment in exchange for saving Vasya's life. Vasya rejects Medved's aid and flees into the crowd. Varvara, Olga's servant, catches her and reveals herself to be Tamara's sister and Vasya's great-aunt. With the help of Varvara and a reluctant Polunochnitsa, Vasya is guided onto the Midnight-road, a realm of perpetual darkness where those with the sight can cross vast distances. Exhausted and severely wounded, Vasya loses consciousness.

Vasya awakens in a strange patchwork forest and navigates shifting landscapes until she approaches a frozen lake surrounded by an ancient forest. Magical horses - Solovey's kin - transform into all manner of birds as they graze in the meadow. An old cottage stands at the water's edge. Vasya takes refuge in the ruin, waking the dormant Domovaya. From a lake-spirit, Vasya learns that the house belonged to her great-grandmother, the witch behind the legend of Baba Yaga. Vasya's grandmother was seduced by the sorcerer Kasyan and stole the golden mare - Pohzar, the Firebird - with the ensorcelled bridle. Tamara rode after him and never returned.

Polunochnitsa chastises Vasya, revealing that the chyerti are taking sides in the ancient conflict and wondering if Vasya intends to align herself with Morozko. Medved also confronts Vasya in Midnight and offers an alliance: vengeance in exchange for overthrowing Moscow and the Orthodox church. Vasya rejects him. He unleashes his upyry on Vasya and an injured Phozar, the golden mare, but Baba Yaga, who persists as a spirit in Midnight, intervenes to drive them off. The old woman expresses her desire for Vasya to inherit the cottage and horses where she can live out her days in peace without fear of mobs or pyres. Vasya is flattered, having finally found what she believes is a place she could call home, but insists she must first bind Medved and protect her loved ones.

Vasya learns from Polunochnitsa that upon unleashing Medved, Morozko exchanged his own freedom for her life. She resolves to find the frost-demon, asking that Pozhar guide her through Midnight to Morozko's white mare, since blood calls to blood among the immortal horses and her own bond with Morozko would be too tenuous. Along the way, she rescues Vladimir Andreevich, Olga's husband, from a river-spirit that caused a flood on Medved's orders. However, the silver meant as tribute for the Tatars is swept up and lost in the current.

Pohzar leads Vasya to the lands of winter in Midnight where they discover Morozko imprisoned in an ancient Midwinter village, trapped not by chains but enchanted in memory of when he was welcomed as a King and honoured with festivities and sacrifices. He sits at a feast with no recollection of Vasya, having been offered a girl named Yelena. Vasya challenges this dangerous young Morozko to a knife-fight and goads him to take her as a sacrifice instead. He triumphs easily, opening her wrist. She is carried, half-unconscious, by Morozko to the village bathhouse where he heals her wounds, revealing that his memories are stirring. Vasya invites him to the inner bathhouse where physical intimacy draws him back to himself. Ashamed, Morozko apologizes and placidly explains that he freed Medved because he believed Vasya's powers could provide a bridge between humans and chyerti. Dismayed and vulnerable, Vasya turns from him, but Morozko's confesses the truth: he couldn't bear the grief of seeing her die in the pyre. She reveals her desire to be with him even if he is not a man and can't offer her a life under God. When they leave the village, Pozhar suggests that they use the golden bridle that once enslaved her to bind the Bear.

Vasya and Morozko ride back toward Moscow together. Morozko is hesitant that he can persist long in the summer lands, but summons the courage with Vasya's reassurance. On the Midnight-road, they reunite with her brother, Sasha, who is in the company of Father Sergei Radonezhsky, the holiest man in all of Russia. Vasya introduces Morozko to her brother, who quickly intuits the nature of their relationship. Morozko swears that he will not bind Vasya to the dark or cold, but that he and Sasha both know she will never be able to live a normal life among mortals.

In Moscow, Medved has once again turned to Father Konstantin for companionship. The Bear feels a kinship with Konstantin as a result of his inner-conflict and artistry. Promising the priest power and influence, Medved's presence brings plague and the walking dead. Konstantin quickly rises to the ranks of bishop due to his apparent ability to subdue the upyry.

Vasya, Morozko and the two monks return to Moscow. Morozko and Medved immediately engage in vicious combat. Disguised as a serving girl, Vasya infiltrates the palace with Olga's help, but Konstantin immediately recognizes her. Fleeing to the treasure-room in utter terror, Vasya inadvertently summons Morozko from the clutches of the Bear, a power that surprises even the frost-demon. With Morozko's help she locates the golden bridle.

Vasya and Morozko arrive to find Konstantin holding Olga at knifepoint. Medved brings more upyry through the gates. The fighting is desperate until Sergei destroys all the walking-dead with prayer of genuine faith in God. Konstantin, shattered by the revelation that God may have been real all along and Medved had deceived him yet again, cuts his own throat. The willing sacrifice weakens Medved, who turns to Morozko with a desperate plea to save the priest's life. Morozko refuses. Vasya binds Medved with the golden ropes and Morozko leads his twin back into the darkness.

Vasya propositions that Morozko meet her sister, the Princess of Serpukhov, hoping that a conversation between them will encourage Olga not to fear for her sister's soul. Olga, terrified upon the revelation that her sister's companion is the same death-demon who took her stillborn daughter, sends Morozko away. Unable to endure the summer and growing connection to the mortal world, Morozko extends Vasya an offer to return with him to his winter lands, confident that there is nothing more she can do for the people of Moscow. However, with the tribute of silver lost in the floodwater, Vasya know that war with the Tatar general in Mamai is inevitable. She accepts that Morozko can't stay and fight with her, but informs him that she will be doing everything in her power to save her family. Morozko instructs that she look for him at the first signs of winter.

Vasya returns to the Midnight-road with Sasha. Here, they encounter Polunochnitsa, who is furious at Vasya for taking Morozko's side. As the ruler of Midnight, she redirects the siblings straight into the Tatar camp where they are swiftly captured. Vasya orchestrates a miraculous escape by speaking with the camp's horses, but has no choice but to leave the severely wounded Sasha behind. Pozhar, summoned by Deb Grib, a mushroom-spirit who became Vasya's first ally, carries Vasya to Midnight where she returns to the solitary oak tree and makes a new bargain with Medved: for his freedom, he will swear an oath to serve her and never again unleash plague or the walking-dead on Russian lands. Medved complies. Vasya then captures Polunochnitsa with the golden rope that had bound Medved, demanding her allegiance as Baba Yaga's true heir. Satisfied that Vasya finally understands that her mission was never to take a side in the ancient conflict, but to unite them, Polunochnitsa swears fealty to Vasya.

With her new allies, Vasya rescues Sasha and Vladimir. Oleg of Ryazan, a Russian prince allied with the Tatars, witnesses her supernatural affinity and secretly agrees to turn the tide. The parties meet at Kokomna, where Vasya secures a promise from Dmitrii and Sergei: they will never condemn witches or punish those who honour the old spirits. In exchange, she and Medved summon the chyerti to fight alongside the army at the Battle of Kulikovo on the banks of the Don.

As he promised, Morozko returns at the turn of the season. He is skeptical of Vasya's decision to release Medved, but is reminded that he once made a similar bargain and should not judge her. He then reveals a discovery he came to upon looking deeper into her family history: Tamara and Varvara's father was Chernomor, the sea-king.

Morozko informs Vasya that he will not aid in the fighting and is only present to play the role of death-god to the fallen. Sasha, meanwhile, rides out for single combat against the Tatar champion, Chelubey. He wins, but is mortally wounded and carried by Vasya and Pohzar away from the battlefield. On the twilit road between life and death, Sasha rejects Medved's water of life, which when combined with Morozko's water of death can resurrect the dead. Sasha dies of his own volition, a choice Vasya respects after stripping Olga of her own decision to save her unborn daughter.

Following Sasha's death, Morozko lends his strength to the Russian front in the Battle of Kulikovo. Vasya and the brothers ride into the fray. Together, they pour fire, frost and chaos into the Tartars' ranks. Oleg charges from one flank, Vladimir's cavalry bursts from the forest and the lesser chyerti provide unseen aid. The Tartar defence shatters.

In the aftermath of the battle, Morozko reminds Medved of an outstanding dept; he owes Morozko a life. The frost-demon reveals that he has kept Solovey in the form of the nightingale preserved since his death in Moscow. Combining their powers, the brothers resurrect Vasya's beloved stallion. Hoofbeats sound behind her, and Solovey noses her cheek in greeting.

Medved departs for the unknown, bound by oath but free. The chyerti confirm their allegiance to Vasya. She shares a passionate kiss with Morozko before the pair ride into Midnight, she on Solovey and he on the white mare. First, they plan to return to Moscow to bring Olga news of Sasha's death. Vasya expresses a desire to ride to the sea, still desperate to see the wider world. Eventually, she will return to the house by the lake, where she intends to hone her magic and build a secret haven for all chyerti, witches, the immortal horses and the old ways behind Dmitrii's unified Russia.

== Major characters ==
- Vasilisa "Vasya" Petrovna: a young woman who has inherited a gift to see fantastical creatures that are invisible to most people. Nearly burned under suspicions of witchcraft, she finds herself on a perilous quest to save all of Russia, both seen and unseen. She awakens dormant magic and discovers the truth about her bloodline.
- Morozko: the frost-demon and death-god. With his power waning, he is left with no option but to make a perilous deal with his twin brother. He navigates the significance of his love for Vasya, providing support where he can.
- Medved: the chaos-demon and Morozko's twin brother. He has a strained affection for Konstantin.
- Konstantin Nikonovich: a handsome and charismatic priest of the Orthodox church. Konstantin developed a feverish obsession with Vasya during his harbour in Lesnaya Zemlya. He uses his influence to stir up a mob in Moscow that burns her as a witch.
- Aleksandr "Sasha" Peresvet: Vasya's older brother and a warrior monk.
- Polunochnitsa "Midnight": a chyert and master of the Midnight-road. She is allied with Baba Yaga and displeased when Vasya takes a side in the ancient brothers' conflict.
- Solovey: Vasya's magical stallion. He is slain by Konstantin, but later resurrected by Morozko and Medved.
