= Winternight trilogy =

Adult historical fantasy trilogy

- The Bear and the Nightingale (2017); The Girl in the Tower (2017); The Winter of the Witch (2019)
- Author: Katherine Arden
- Country: United States
- Language: English
- Genre: Historical fantasy
- Publisher: Del Rey
- Published: January 10, 2017 – January 8, 2019
- Media type: Print (hardcover and paperback), audiobook, e-book

The Winternight trilogy is a series of adult historical fantasy novels written by American author Katherine Arden. The trilogy consists of The Bear and the Nightingale (2017), The Girl in the Tower (2017), and The Winter of the Witch (2019). The story surrounds Vasilisa "Vasya" Petrovna, a girl who has inherited a spiritual gift to see and speak with the fantastical creatures that inhabit her medieval Russian village. This leads her to a conflict with a priest of the Orthodox Church who becomes convinced that she is a witch. Vasya's talents also attract the favour and ire of the enigmatic frost-demon Morozko and his sinister brother Medved.

== Development and publication ==
Arden says she drew inspiration for the series from Russian folklore. She has a degree in Russian and had lived in Moscow before moving to Hawaii. In October 2014, Del Rey acquired the rights for the first book, The Bear and the Nightingale, which was published on January 10, 2017. It is Arden's debut book. Its follow-up, The Girl in the Tower, was released on December 5, 2017. The final book in the series, The Winter of the Witch, was released on January 8, 2019.

== Reception ==
The Winternight trilogy has received positive reviews. Critics from Publishers Weekly praised The Bear and the Nightingale, stating "Arden’s debut is an earthy, beautifully written love letter to Russian folklore, with an irresistible heroine who wants only to be free of the bonds placed on her gender and claim her own fate in 14th-century Russia." Kirkus stated, "Arden has shaped a world that neatly straddles the seen and the unseen, where readers will hear echoes of stories from childhood while recognizing the imagination that has transformed old material into something fresh", in a starred review. Everdeen Mason of The Washington Post, said "Arden’s debut novel has the cadence of a beautiful fairy tale but is darker and more lyrical."

The Bear and the Nightingale was named Amazon's "Best Book of January 2017".
