= The Bear and the Nightingale =

2017 novel by Katherine Arden

- First edition
- Author: Katherine Arden
- Language: English
- Series: Winternight Trilogy #1
- Genre: Historical Fantasy
- Publisher: Del Rey Books
- Publication date: 10 January 2017
- Publication place: United Kingdom
- Pages: 368 (Paperback Edition); 336 (Hardcover Edition); 336 (ebook Edition); 708 minutes (Audiobook)
- ISBN: 1101885939
- Followed by: The Girl in the Tower

The Bear and the Nightingale is a historical fantasy novel written by Katherine Arden, published in 2017 by Del Rey Books. It is Arden's debut novel, and the first novel in the Winternight trilogy.

The Bear and the Nightingale is set in medieval Russia and incorporates elements of Russian folklore. The central character is a young girl, Vasya Petrovna, who is able to communicate with mythological creatures, at a time when Orthodox Christianity is attempting to stamp out all belief in such beings.

The Bear and the Nightingale was a finalist for the Locus Award for Best First Novel, and Arden received nominations for the John W. Campbell Award for Best New Writer. The full trilogy was a finalist for the Hugo Award for Best Series.

== Synopsis ==
=== Plot ===
The story opens with an introduction of Pyotr Vladimiroch's household. Pyotr is a Russian boyar who lives in the isolated woodside village of Lesnaya Zemlya with his wife, Marina Ivanovna, and four children: Kolya, Sasha, Olga and Alyosha. The family is huddled around the kitchen on a cold winter evening to listen to their nursemaid, Dunya, recount the fairy tale of Morozko, the frost-demon, who tests the resilience of mortals and sometimes rewards the brave with treasures.

After the children have fallen asleep, Marina informs her husband that she is with child and unlikely to survive a fifth pregnancy. However, she is determined to see it through because she senses that her unborn daughter will inherit her late mother's spiritual gifts. To the grief of her family, Marina indeed dies in childbirth. Her daughter is named Vasilisa "Vasya" Petrovna.

Vasya grows into a free-spirited girl and is drawn to the wild places surrounding her village. The gifts foretold by her mother manifest in an ability to see and speak with the chyerti, household and nature spirits that are invisible to most people. Some chyerti provide protection in exchange for offerings, but their existence is fragile and intrinsically linked with mortal belief.

One day, while exploring Vasya comes across an unusual and unfamiliar oak tree. At the foot of this tree lies a one-eyed man. The man encourages Vasya to approach him, but their meeting is interrupted by the arrival of a blue-eyed man on horseback. Vasya scurries away while the blue-eyed man orders the one-eyed man to go back to sleep because it is still winter. Vasya is found by Sasha, her older brother, who had organized a search party fearing she was lost in the woods. After returning home, Sasha warns his father that Vasya is in dire need of a mother to raise her. Pyotr takes this advice and travels to Moscow with Sasha and Kolya in the hopes that his late wife's father, Grand Prince Ivan II of Moscow, will help him secure a new wife.

While in Moscow, Sasha meets a charismatic monk who makes a good impression and as a result Sasha begs his father to let him join the Christian monastery. Pyotr agrees on the grounds that Sasha spends one additional year at home to ensure that his decision is not impulsive. Meanwhile, the Grand Prince presents his own young daughter, Anna Ivanovna, to Pyotr as a new wife. Like Vasya, Anna has inherited the ability to see fantastical creatures, which she is convinced are demons. Anna's gifts have resulted in her being ostracized by her family, who think her mad, pushing her into the arms of the church. The Grand Prince takes advantage of Pyotr's request for a wife in order to get Anna out of the public eye. He also arranges a smart match Olga, Vasya's older sister.

Not long before leaving Moscow, Pyotr and his sons have an altercation with a blue-eyed stranger while out shopping for gifts for his younger children. Affronted and hungover from the night before, Kolya threatens him. In exchange for his son's life, Pyotr swears to present his youngest daughter with a gift of the stranger's choosing: a sapphire pendant.

Upon returning to Lesnaya Zemlya, Pyotr informs Olga that she will be married in Moscow. He introduces Anna Ivanovna as their new stepmother and instructs Dunya to present Vasya with the blue-eyed stranger's pendant. In a dream, Dunya is confronted by the stranger and persuades him that Vasya is too young to be entrusted with the talisman. The stranger accepts Dunya's appeal that he wait until she is grown.

In the following seven years, Kolya and Olga are both married and Sasha becomes a monk. Anna, meanwhile, realizes that Vasya shares her affliction. Because Vasya embraces her gift, Anna becomes convinced that she must be a witch. Her suspicions are spurred on by the arrival of a handsome priest, Konstantin Niconovich, who develops a frantic obsession with Vasya. Konstantin identifies that the isolated community still harbours lingering pagan beliefs and does everything in his power to snuff them out. His sermons result in a feverish devotion for the Christian God sweeping over the villagers. In turn, the chyerti's protection wanes. Animals grow sick, wolves ravage the countryside, crops wither and the weather takes a devilish turn. The weakening chyerti warn Vasya about Medved the Bear, the one-eyed man who threatened her as a child. With the village defenceless, Medved is able to influence and corrupt the villagers, particularly Konstantin and Anna Ivanovna.

Pyotr briefly hopes to marry Vasya off to a rich suitor, but the wedding falls through because Vasya refuses to be confined by societal expectations. Dunya, meanwhile, has continued to dream of the blue-eyed stranger. Twice she convinces him to give Vasya more time, but following the death of a local woman he appears again, demanding to know the reason behind her delay. Dunya at last confirms that he is Morozko, the spirit of winter. She confesses that she loves Vasya as if she were her own and fears what the frost-demon would have of her. Morozko reassures her that he can save them all, but that Vasya must have the necklace because the end of Dunya's life draws near.

As foretold, Dunya swiftly grows sick and weak. She passes away on the same night she finally gives Vasya the pendant. The gift enables Vasya and Morozko to save Konstantin from a flesh-eating upyr that had risen from the grave due to Medved's growing power. More convinced than ever that she is a witch, Anna and Konstantin take advantage of Pyotr's absence from the village and conspire to send Vasya to a convent. Anna offers up an alternative: Vasya can have her freedom in exchange for snowdrops, a flower that only grows at the cusp of spring. Wearing the necklace, Vasya flees alone into the frozen forest where she is nearly caught by Medved, but she is again saved by Morozko.

Vasya awakens in Morozko's illusory home, where the frost-demon nurses her back to health and gifts her a magical stallion named Solovey (Nightingale) as a companion. She bonds with Solovey in the wilderness beyond time and eventually hears the tale of Morozko's ancient rivalry with Medved, whom he reveals to be his twin brother. Morozko has kept Medved sealed and sleeping for an age. Medved is hellbent on destroying everything once he escapes imprisonment. Morozko presents Vasya with a generous dowry of riches. Thinking of the frost-demon of Dunya's stories, she rejects his gifts, accepting only a basket of snowdrops to quiet her stepmother's ire.

Back in the village, Medved convinces Konstantin that he is the voice of God and that he must sacrifice a "witch". With Vasya assumed frozen to death in the forest, Konstantin leads Anna Ivanovna to the old oak tree in her place. Medved swiftly reveals himself as the Bear and kills Anna, absolving him of Morozko's imprisonment. Vasya, meanwhile, rides Solovey back to her village in order to do what she can to protect her family. She is aided by the chyerti friends of her childhood, but ultimately proves no match against the Bear. She is saved by the sudden arrival of her father, Pyotr, who offers his life in Vasya's place. His sacrifice binds Medved anew, forcing him to return to his endless slumber beneath the oak.

With Morozko's aid, Vasya frightens Konstantin into fleeing from Lesnaya Zemlya. She hopes that with the priest gone, the villagers will return to honouring the old pagan faith in tandem with the new Christian God. She then convinces her brother, Alyosha, that in order for him to establish himself as a man in their father's household, he cannot associate with a witch-girl. Knowing she can never live a normal life in a place where everyone fears her, she rides Solovey deep into the snowy wilderness where Morozko welcomes her back into his home.

=== Major characters ===
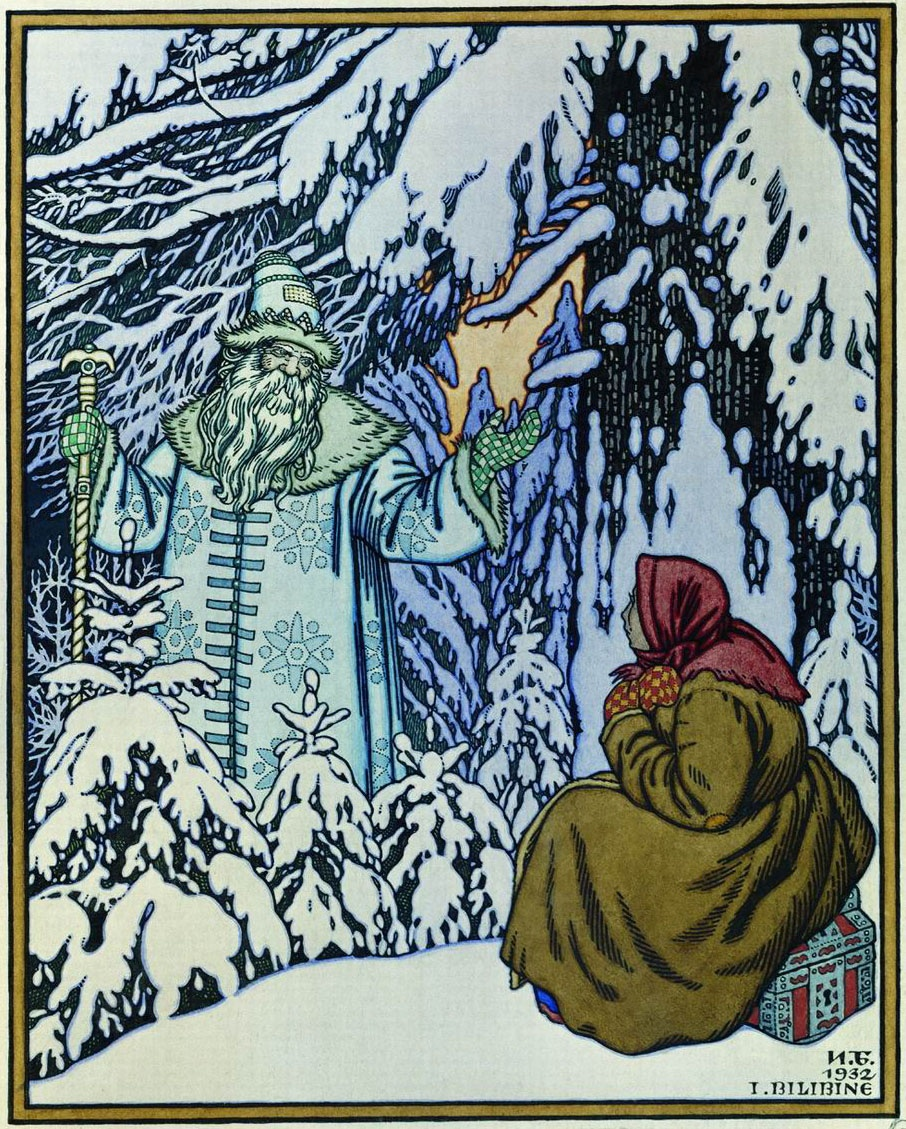
1932. Illustration of the story of Morozko, Father Frost, by Ivan Bilibin.

- Vasilisa "Vasya" Petrovna: a brave young girl who has inherited a gift to see the fantastical creatures that lurk in her home and village. Her powers put her at odds with a priest of the Orthodox church, her own family and Medved, the mysterious one-eyed man who stirs in the forest.
- Morozko: the frost-demon and death-god. He is twin brother to Medved and has tasked himself with his imprisonment beneath an ancient oak for hundreds of years. He favours Vasya, whom he takes in after she flees from her village. He gifts her a magic horse and helps her realize her potential.
- Medved: Morozko's twin brother who appears both as a one-eyed man and a monstrous one-eyed Bear. He seeks revenge against mankind and Morozko for his long imprisonment.
- Pyotr Vladimirovich: a Russian boyar and father to Vasya. He disturbs his daughter's peaceful childhood when he brings home a deeply pious woman from Moscow as a second wife.
- Anna Ivanovna: the daughter of Grand Prince Ivan II of Moscow and the second wife of Pyotr Vladimirovich. She shares Vasya's gift to see the chyerti, but believes them to be devils. Her relationship with Vasya is fraught with fear and jealousy.
- Konstantin Nikonovich: a handsome young priest who is sent to Lesnaya Zemlya as a deterrent for an early revolution. He quickly gains the trust of the citizens and frightens them into abandoning faith in the chyerti that guard their homes. He is plagued by complex emotions for Vasya, whom he simultaneously fears and desires.
- Dunya: Pyotr's household's elderly nursemaid and housekeeper. She convinces Morozko to wait until Vasya is grown before bestowing her with a supernatural burden, but still fears that he intends to deceive her.
- Solovey: an immortal horse gifted to Vasya by Morozko. He is a proud bay stallion with a white star on his forehead.

== Background ==
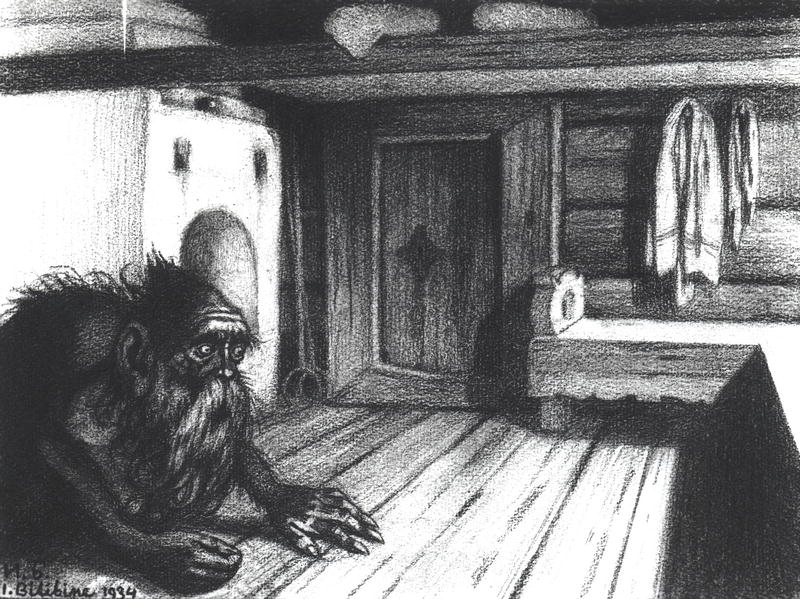
Illustration of a domovoy by Ivan Bilibin.

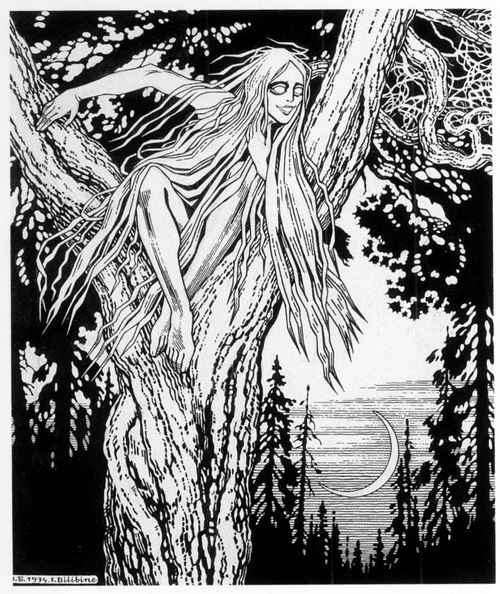
Illustration of a rusalka by Ivan Bilibin.

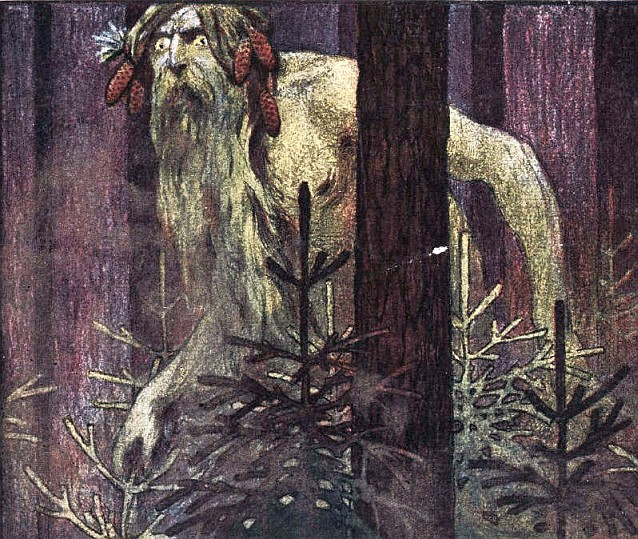
Illustration of a leshy in the forest.

The Bear and the Nightingale is Arden's debut novel and was published in January 2017 by Del Rey Books. Arden completed her diploma in French and Russian literature before moving to Hawaii for 6 months while writing her novel. Her fascination with Russian literature and history prompted her to write a novel that was set in medieval Russia. According to Arden, her appeal with this subject stems from a young age. In an interview with CNET she revealed that she had read Russian fairytales as a child.

The novel tackles issues such as gender and women's roles. Being set in medieval Russia, Arden challenges these issues in her novel and this is noted in her interview with BookPage as Ping states, “Vasya is a truly compelling heroine. She is strong enough to embrace her differences, but she still reads as a woman of her time”. Arden confirms this and explains her difficulty in balancing what she believed was right and what her character believed was right in medieval Russia.

Arden also weaves a mix of Russian folklore and Slavic mythology into the narrative. She tells the tale of the intertwining but conflicting beliefs of tradition and religion by incorporating characters such as the ambitious priest, Konstantin Nikonovich and enchanting fairy-tale creatures. Vasya is used as a medium to explore the interactions between these opposing philosophies. These creatures include:

- Domovoy: the household spirit who lives within the boundaries of the household. In the novel, the domovoi is depicted as the guardian of the home, placated with food offerings in return for protection.

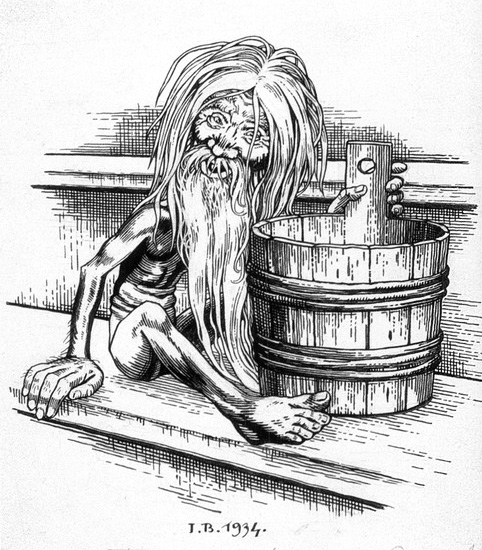
Illustration of a bannik by Ivan Bilibin.

- Rusalka: a water spirit that can be found around lakes. They come in the form of women and their aim is mainly to entice men. In the novel, the rusalka is the first creature to warn Vasya of the priest's danger to the way of life of the villagers.
- Leshy: forest spirits who hide in tall grass and enjoy playing tricks on people wading through forests.
- Bannik: bathhouse spirits. The bannik in the bathhouse where Anna Ivanovna lived before marrying Pyotr would scare her so much she would refuse to bathe for weeks at a time until she was forced by her stepmother.
- Dvorovoi: the household yard spirit. The dvorovoi spend their time in the stables and yards of houses. The dvorovoi play a significant role in the novel by warning Vasya of their fleeting time left due to the depleting offerings left by the villagers.
- Vodianoy: a male water spirit. They are vengeful creatures who enjoy drowning people. They are typically considered the male version of rusalkas.

When asked why she incorporated so many myths and legends into her novel Arden responded, “Slavic paganism never really disappeared from the Russian countryside after the arrival of Christianity; rather they coexisted, with some friction, for centuries. I was fascinated by the tensions inherent in such a system”.

== Publication ==
The Bear and the Nightingale was released in early January 2017, followed by the sequel The Girl in the Tower, which was released in December 2017. The final novel of the series, The Winter of the Witch, was released in January 2019. The series was published by Del Rey, an imprint of Penguin Random House. The Bear and the Nightingale was awarded Amazon's Best Science Fiction and Fantasy of 2017 and nominated for Goodreads Choice Awards Best Fantasy 2017 and Goodreads Choice Awards Best Debut Goodreads Author 2017.

The Bear and the Nightingale has also been published in paperback, hardcover, ebook and audio editions. Official translations include Bulgarian, Dutch, Polish, Portuguese, Serbian, Croatian, Hungarian, Persian, Spanish, Turkish, Chinese, Czech and Russian.

== Reception ==
The Bear and the Nightingale has been received positively by critics and reviewers. Publishers Weekly wrote that “the stunning prose (“The blood flung itself out to Vasya’s skin until she could feel every stirring in the air”) forms a fully immersive, unusual, and exciting fairy tale that will enchant readers from the first page". In a starred review, Kirkus commented on how the story was a "fairy tale [..] grounded in the realities of daily life in the time period", and that "even minor characters are given their own sets of longings and fears and impact the trajectory of the story". Everdeen Mason of The Washington Post said:

"The novel is deceptively simple, but its characters and plot are sophisticated and complex. Arden explores what happens when fear and ignorance whip people into a furor, and how society can be persuaded to act against its own interests so easily.”

Some critics were disappointed with the later chapters of the book. In an otherwise glowing review, fantasy writer and critic Amal El-Mohtar finds fault in the book's conclusion, for a "mishmash of affect and style, and an ending that undercuts much of its former power." Similarly, writer and book reviewer Caitlyn Paxson finds that "plot decisions and character developments veer down the path of least resistance" in the end of a book she would still "happily recommend."

The Bear and the Nightingale was a finalist for the 2018 Locus Award for Best First Novel, and Arden received nominations for the John W. Campbell Award for Best New Writer in 2018 and 2019. The Winternight trilogy was a finalist for the Hugo Award for Best Series in 2020.
