= Buyan =

Island in Russian folklore

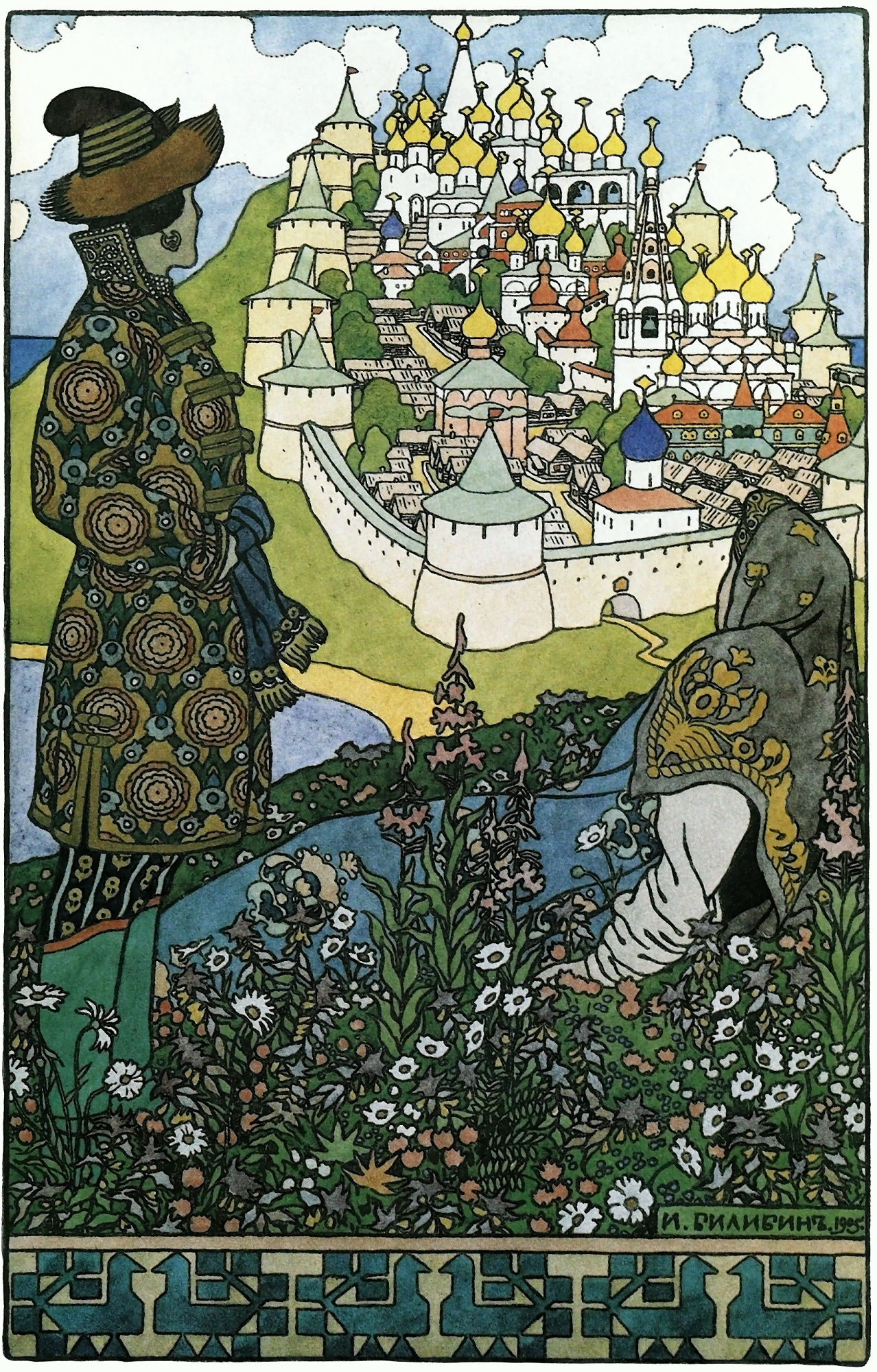
Buyan Island, by Ivan Bilibin (1905)

In Russian folklore, Buyan (Russian: Буя́н), sometimes transliterated as Bujan, is a mysterious island in the ocean with the ability to appear and disappear with the tide. The island is found in byliny and skazki. It gained wider recognition after appearing in Alexander Pushkin's The Tale of Tsar Saltan.

== Description ==
Buyan is an oceanic island, sometimes described as a paradise. The island of Buyan features in many fairy tales; Koshchei the Deathless keeps his soul of immortality hidden there, secreted inside a needle placed inside an egg in the mystical oak-tree; other legends call the island the source of all weather, generated there and sent forth into the world by the god Perun. Buyan also appears in Alexander Pushkin's Tale of Tsar Saltan.

It is mentioned in the medieval Dove Book as the place of the mythical stone with healing and magic powers, known as the Alatyr (Russian: Алатырь), which is guarded by the bird Gagana and by Garafena the serpent.

== See also ==
- Kitezh
- Leđan
- Tír na nÓg
- Fortunate Isles

== Bibliography ==
- Dixon-Kennedy, Mike (8 December 1998). Encyclopedia of Russian and Slavic Myth and Legend. Bloomsbury Publishing USA. ISBN 978-1-57607-487-9.
- Haney, Jack V. (18 December 2014). "Serial Tales from the Far North". An Anthology of Russian Folktales. Routledge. ISBN 978-1-317-47690-0.
- Meletinsky, E.M., ed. (1990). Алатырь [Alatyr] (in Russian). Советская энциклопедия. p. 333. ISBN 5-85270-032-0.
