= Leđan =

Leđan or Legen was an ancient, often described as magical, city from the Croatian mythology and folklore. It features in Ivana Brlić-Mažuranić's Croatian Tales of Long Ago, a collection of Croatian fairy tales dramatised into short stories.

It also appears in Serbian folk stories and poetry, one example being the epic song "Ženidba Dušanova" (Dušan's wedding), in which the Serbian emperor Dušan takes king Mijail's daughter as a bride from Leđan.

== See also ==
- Kitezh
- Buyan
