= Katherine Arden =

American novelist

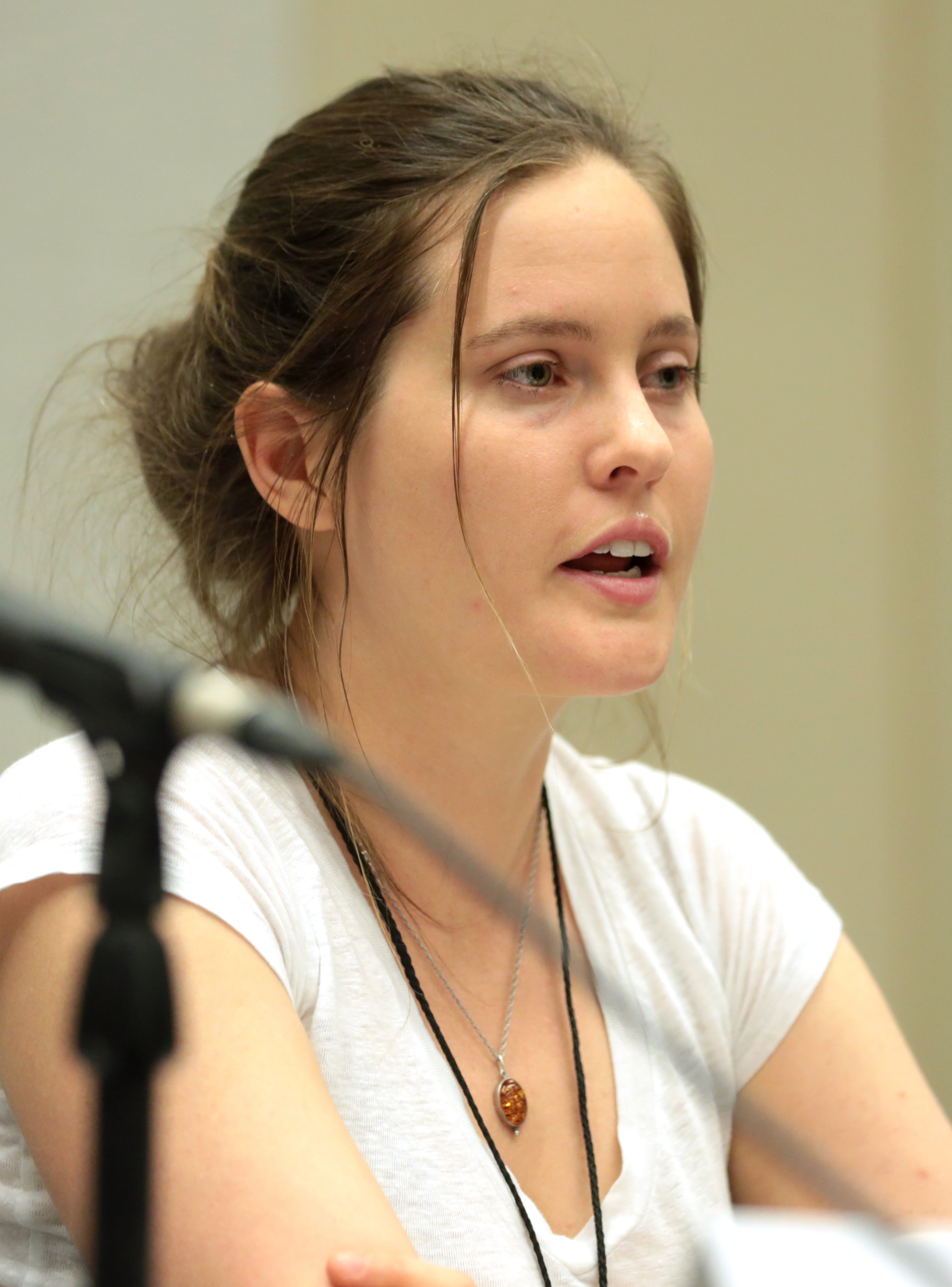
- Arden at the 2018 Phoenix Comic Fest
- Born: Katherine Arden Burdine; 1987 (age 38–39); Texas, U.S.
- Education: Middlebury College (2011)
- Occupation: Novelist
- Writing career
- Period: 2017–present
- Genres: Historical fantasy; young adult fiction
- Notable work: Winternight trilogy
- Notable awards: Vermont Golden Dome Book Award (2020)
- Website: katherinearden.com

Katherine Arden Burdine (born 1987), best known by her pen name Katherine Arden, is an American novelist. Known primarily for her Winternight trilogy of fantasy novels, which are set in medieval Russia and have garnered nominations for Hugo and Locus Awards, she is also the author of the Small Spaces series of horror novels for middle grade children. The first in the latter series, Small Spaces, won the Vermont Golden Dome Book Award in 2020

== Biography ==
Arden was born in Austin, Texas, and currently resides in Vermont. She spent a year in Moscow after high school before returning to Vermont. She attended Middlebury College, graduating with a degree in Russian and French in 2011.

After graduating, and uncertain what she wanted to do, Arden took a job on a farm in Hawaii. Bored with the job, she took to writing in her spare time, and "the rest of the writing process just sort of happened in stops and starts."

Arden's writing is influenced by J.R.R Tolkien, Mary Renault, Naomi Novik, Patrick O'Brian, Dorothy Dunnett, Diana Gabaldon, and Robin McKinley.

== Bibliography ==
=== Winternight trilogy ===
- The Bear and the Nightingale (2017)
- The Girl in the Tower (2017)
- The Winter of the Witch (2019)

=== Small Spaces series ===
- Small Spaces (2018)
- Dead Voices (2019)
- Dark Waters (2021)
- Empty Smiles (2022)

=== Standalone novels ===
- The Warm Hands of Ghosts (2024)
- The Unicorn Hunters (2026)

== Awards and nominations ==
- 2018: Finalist for the John W. Campbell Award for Best New Writer
- 2018: Finalist for the Locus Award for Best First Novel, The Bear and the Nightingale
- 2018: Finalist for the Vermont Book Award for Fiction, The Bear and the Nightingale
- 2019: Finalist for the John W. Campbell Award for Best New Writer
- 2020: Finalist for the Hugo Award for Best Series, Winternight trilogy
- 2020: Winner of the Vermont Golden Dome Book Award, Small Spaces
