= Dove Book =

Medieval Russian religious ballad

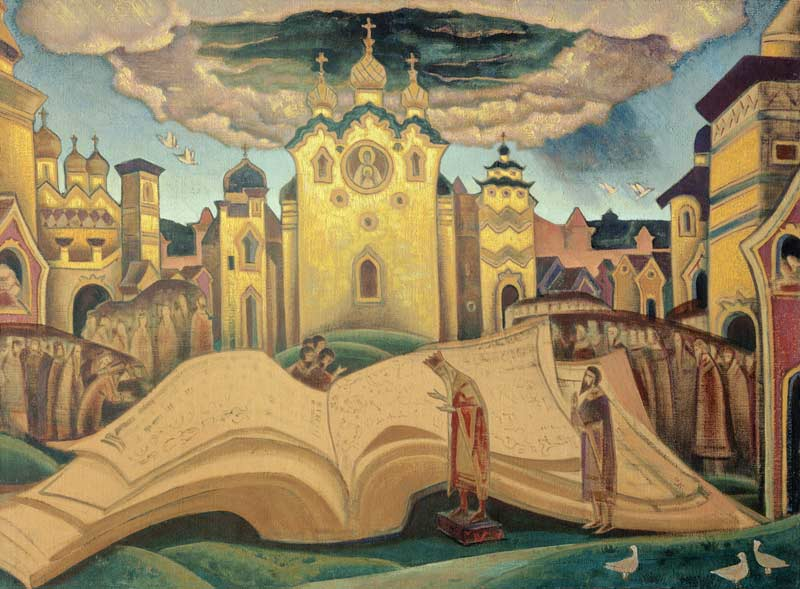
The kings of the Earth reading the Book of the Dove, a Symbolist painting by Nicholas Roerich (1922)

The Verse About the Book of the Dove or Dove Book (Russian: Голубиная книга, romanized: Golubinaya Kniga) is a medieval Russian spiritual verse. At least 20 versions are known. They vary in length from 30 to over 900 lines. The poem is generally thought to have been written c. 1500 in the Novgorod region, though Russian nationalists postulate its great antiquity. The earliest extant manuscript is dated to the 17th century.

The main part of the Dove Book is a long sequence of riddles. In a series of answers to those riddles, King David explains the origin of light, sun, moon, and social classes. He also mentions a mysterious stone "clept the Alatyr". Isabel Florence Hapgood describes the content of one version in the following terms:

"The Dove Book" falls from Alatyr, the "burning white stone on the Island of Buyan", the heathen paradise, which lies far towards sunrise, in the "Ocean Sea". The heathen significance of the stone is not known, but it is cleverly explained in "The Dove Book" as the stone whereon Christ stood when he preached to his disciples. This "little book" ("forty fathoms long and twenty wide") was written by St. John the Evangelist, and no man can read it. The book is somewhat suggestive of the "little book" in Revelation. The prophet Isaiah deciphered only three pages of it in as many years. But the "most wise tsar David" undertakes to give, from memory, the book's answers to various questions put to him by Tsar Vladimir (as spokesman of a throng of emperors and princes). A great deal of curious information is conveyed - all very poetically expressed - including some odd facts in natural history, such as: that the Straphyl is the mother of birds, and that she lives, feeds, and rears her young on the blue sea, drowning mariners and sinking ships. Whenever she (or the Indrik-Beast) moves, an earthquake ensues.

The poem's folk cosmology and the title have been derived by Vladimir Toporov from the Bundahishn. The root "golub" (dove) in title "Golubinaya" is not about birds. It is believed to be derived from the root "glub" (depth, deep), which refers to depth of concepts described in the book. Also it could originate from "sefer torah": truncated "sefer tor" can be translated to Russian as "dove book".

Several major Russian poets and artists of the early 20th century (such as Nicholas Roerich and Andrey Bely) were inspired by the Dove Book. The Russian Orthodox Church had it banned as a heretical mixture of apocryphal Christian tales with pagan lore.
