= Russian folklore =

Folklore of Russians and other ethnic groups of Russia

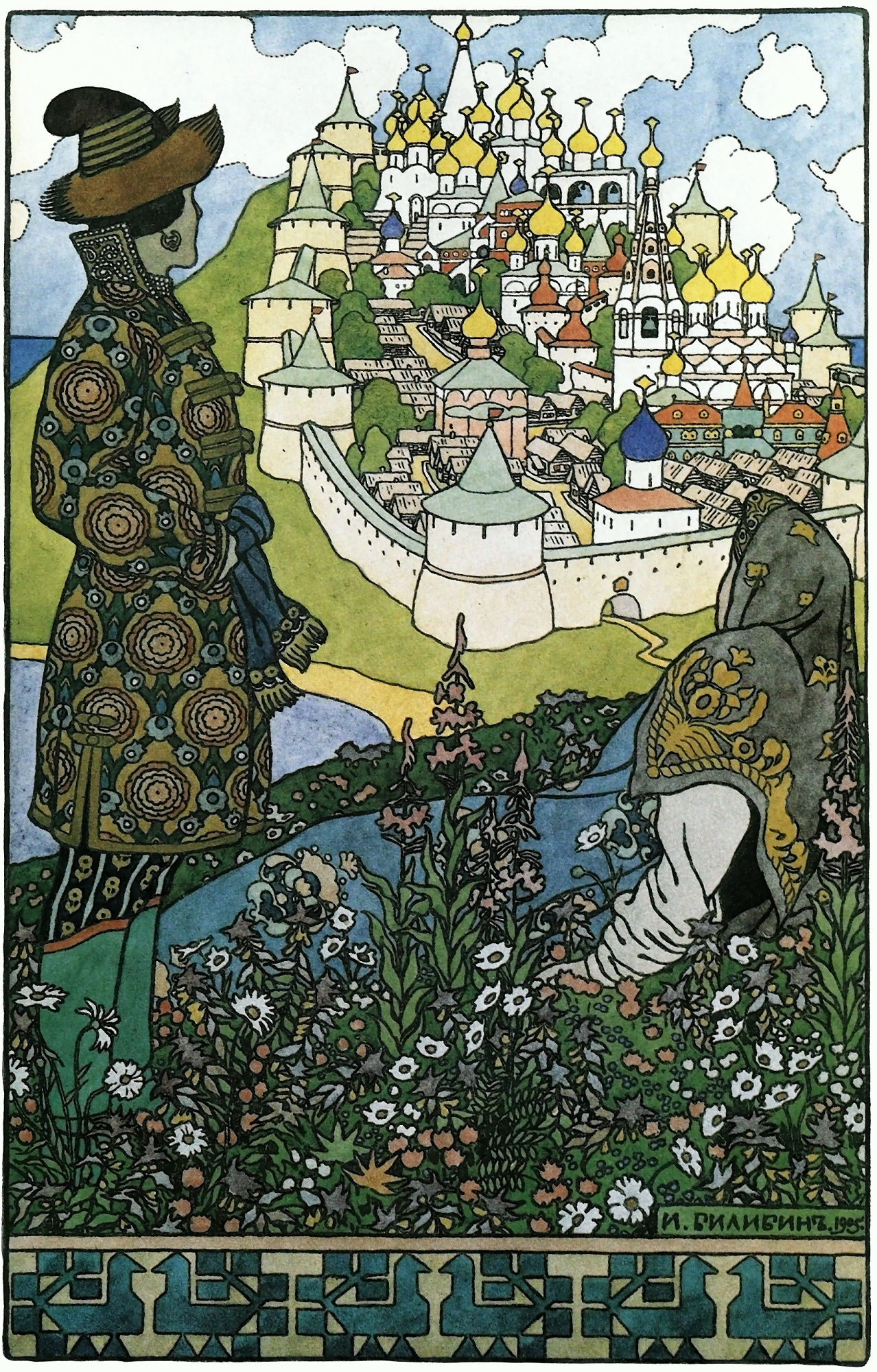
Buyan by Ivan Bilibin

The Russian folklore, i.e., the folklore of Russian people, takes its roots in the pagan beliefs of ancient Slavs and now is represented in the Russian fairy tales. Epic Russian bylinas are also an important part of Slavic paganism. The oldest bylinas of Kievan cycle were recorded in northwest Russia, especially in Karelia, where most of the Finnish national epic Kalevala was recorded as well.

In the late 19th-century Russian fairy tales began being translated into English, with Russian Folk Tales (1873) by William Ralston, and Tales and Legends from the Land of the Tzar (1890) by Edith Hodgetts.

Many Russian fairy tales and bylinas have been adapted for animation films, or for feature movies by prominent directors such as Aleksandr Ptushko (Ilya Muromets, Sadko) and Aleksandr Rou (Jack Frost, Vasilisa the Beautiful).

Some Russian poets, including Pyotr Yershov and Leonid Filatov, made a number of well-known poetical interpretations of the classical Russian fairy tales, and in some cases, like that of Alexander Pushkin, also created fully original fairy tale poems of great popularity.

Katherine Arden's historical fantasy novel The Bear and the Nightingale (2017) and its two sequels are set in 14th century Russia and heavily feature characters and creatures of Russian folklore, including Morozko, Koschei and the Firebird.

== History ==
=== Folk tradition of Pre-Christian Rus' (pre-987 CE) ===
The organisation of early Slavic society seems largely to have been based in small towns run by a group of people rather than a single leader, and had a strong emphasis on one's family unit. The area proposed as the homeland of Slavic peoples is roughly around modern-day Eastern European countries. East Slavs emerged around the Volga-Dnieper basin. The Oka River was a homeland to Slavic tribes from which Russian culture grew. South Slavic culture grew in Balkan region. West Slavic people grew most likely in eastern Poland. Nature played an essential role in early Slavic culture.

One early Russian object of worship was the "Moist Mother Earth", and a later, possibly related deity was called Mokosh, whose name means "moist" and may have Finnish origins. Mokosh was the goddess of women, children, and animals, and was worshipped for her connection with fertility. Russian soil is generally too thin for robust agriculture, rainfall is infrequent and inopportunely timed in much of the area, and the growing season is relatively short. Fertility and moisture are therefore particularly essential to the success of Russian agriculture. Because from early times the Rus' had an agricultural rather than hunting or herding basis for their food production, and were not on good terms with neighbouring peoples, the success of Russian society was largely dependent on the success of its agriculture.

Additionally, there is thought to have been a notable focus on the feminine element in early Slavic culture, with a subsequent shift to a more patriarchal society as Christianity got a foothold in the area. Ancestor worship was another central aspect of tribal life, and served as a link between past and future generations. Animism was also a common belief, and nature and house spirits played a central role in daily tribal life.

=== Folk tradition in Christian Rus' (987 - 1917/1922 CE) ===
Vladimir I ('Vladimir the Great', 'Saint Vladimir') converted to Christianity in 987 CE, and subsequently mandated it as the state religion of the Kievan Rus'. Just beforehand, he had pushed for worship of a pagan pantheon not native to the Russian people, but that proved largely unsuccessful. Because Christianity had already existed in the area, it caught on more easily than the foreign pagan tradition. Idols were destroyed at Kiev (Kievan Rus') and Novgorod, two cities where Vladimir I had previously put particular attention into establishing a pagan pantheon. Despite the superficial eradication of pagan belief, animism and ancestor worship survived in rituals, stories, charms, and practices in peasant life. Certain pagan deities and objects of worship became inducted into the ranks of Christian saints. Other times, pagan holidays remained in practice but were called by new names, such as Trinity Day, during which peasant girls would honor the nature spirit rusalka, commemorate past ancestors, and practice divination rituals. Another such holiday is St. John's day, which was devoted to "seeing off the spring" and performing rituals to encourage springtime to come again soon. The coexistence of pagan and Christian beliefs in Russian culture is called "duality of religion" or "duality of belief", and was salient in much of Russian peasant culture.

Certain pagan rituals and beliefs were tolerated and even supported by the Church. In these instances, rites were reinterpreted as essentially Christian. For instance, the winter ritual of spreading hay on the floor became associated with celebrating the birth of Jesus during Christmas time. When the Church condemned a practice, it typically did not dismiss it as made-up, but instead acknowledged its power and attributed it to the devil.

=== Russian Folklore in Soviet Russia (1917/1922 - 1991) ===
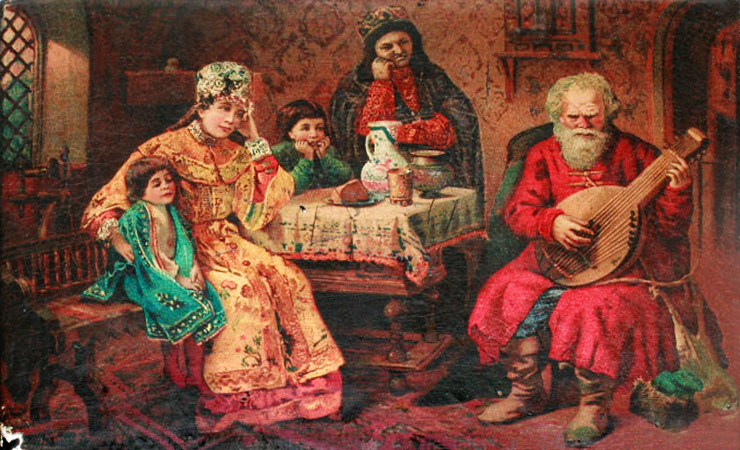
Russia has a long and varied musical history.

Folklorists today consider the 1920s to be the Soviet Union's golden age of folklore. The struggling new government, which had to focus its efforts on establishing a new administrative system and building up the nation's backwards economy, could not be bothered with attempting to control literature, so studies of folklore thrived. There were two primary trends of folklore study during the decade: the formalist and Finnish schools. Formalism focused on the artistic form of ancient byliny and faerie tales, specifically their use of distinctive structures and poetic devices. The Finnish school was concerned with the connections amongst related legends of various Eastern European regions. Finnish scholars collected comparable tales from multiple locales and analysed their similarities and differences, hoping to trace these epic stories' migration paths.

Once Joseph Stalin came to power and put his first five-year plan into motion in 1928, the Soviet government began to criticise and censor folklore studies. Stalin and the Soviet regime repressed Folklore, believing that it supported the old tsarist system and a capitalist economy. They saw it as a remnant of the backward Russian society that the Bolsheviks were working to surpass. To keep folklore studies in check and prevent inappropriate ideas from spreading amongst the masses, the government created the RAPP – the Russian Association of Proletarian Writers. The RAPP specifically focused on censoring fairy tales and children's literature, believing that fantasies and "bourgeois nonsense" harmed the development of upstanding Soviet citizens. Faerie tales were removed from bookshelves and children were encouraged to read books focusing on nature and science. RAPP eventually increased its levels of censorship and became the Union of Soviet Writers in 1932.

In order to continue researching and analysing folklore, intellectuals needed to justify its worth to the Communist regime. Otherwise, collections of folklore, along with all other literature deemed useless for the purposes of Stalin's Five Year Plan, would be an unacceptable realm of study. In 1934, Maxim Gorky gave a speech to the Union of Soviet Writers arguing that folklore could, in fact, be consciously used to promote Communist values. Apart from expounding on the artistic value of folklore, he stressed that traditional legends and faerie tales showed ideal, community-oriented characters, which exemplified the model Soviet citizen. Folklore, with many of its conflicts based on the struggles of a labour oriented lifestyle, was relevant to Communism as it could not have existed without the direct contribution of the working classes. Also, Gorky explained that folklore characters expressed high levels of optimism, and therefore could encourage readers to maintain a positive mindset, especially as their lives changed with Communism's further development.

Iurii Sokolov, the head of the folklore section of the Union of Soviet Writers also promoted the study of folklore by arguing that folklore had originally been the oral tradition of the working people, and consequently could be used to motivate and inspire collective projects amongst the present-day proletariat. Characters throughout traditional Russian folktales often found themselves on a journey of self-discovery, a process that led them to value themselves not as individuals, but rather as a necessary part of a common whole. The attitudes of such legendary characters paralleled the mindset that the Soviet government wished to instill in its citizens. He also pointed out the existence of many tales that showed members of the working class outsmarting their cruel masters, again working to prove folklore's value to Soviet ideology and the nation's society at large.

Convinced by Gor'kij and Sokolov's arguments, the Soviet government and the Union of Soviet Writers began collecting and evaluating folklore from across the country. The Union handpicked and recorded particular stories that, in their eyes, sufficiently promoted the collectivist spirit and showed the Soviet regime's benefits and progress. It then proceeded to redistribute copies of approved stories throughout the population. Meanwhile, local folklore centres arose in all major cities. Responsible for advocating a sense of Soviet nationalism, these organisations ensured that the media published appropriate versions of Russian folktales in a systematic fashion.

Apart from circulating government-approved faerie tales and byliny that already existed, during Stalin's rule authors parroting appropriate Soviet ideologies wrote Communist folktales and introduced them to the population. These contemporary folktales combined the structures and motifs of the old byliny with contemporary life in the Soviet Union. Called noviny, these new tales were considered the renaissance of the Russian epic. Folklorists were called upon to teach modern folksingers the conventional style and structure of the traditional byliny. They also explained to the performers the appropriate types of Communist ideology that should be represented in the new stories and songs.

As the performers of the day were often poorly educated, they needed to obtain a thorough understanding of Marxist ideology before they could be expected to impart folktales to the public in a manner that suited the Soviet government. Besides undergoing extensive education, many folk performers travelled throughout the nation in order to gain insight into the lives of the working class, and thus communicate their stories more effectively. Due to their crucial role in spreading Communist ideals throughout the Soviet Union, eventually some of these performers became highly valued members of Soviet society. A number of them, despite their illiteracy, were even elected as members of the Union of Soviet Writers.

These new Soviet faerie tales and folk songs primarily focused on the contrasts between a miserable life in old tsarist Russia and an improved one under Stalin's leadership. Their characters represented identities for which Soviet citizens should strive, exemplifying the traits of the "New Soviet Man". The heroes of Soviet tales were meant to portray a transformed and improved version of the average citizen, giving the reader a clear goal of the ideal collective-oriented self that the future he or she was meant to become. These new folktales replaced magic with technology and supernatural forces with Stalin.

Instead of receiving essential advice from a mythical being, the protagonist would be given advice from omniscient Stalin. If the character followed Stalin's divine advice, he could be assured success in all his endeavours and a complete transformation into the "New Soviet Man". The villains of these contemporary faerie tales were the Whites and their leader Idolisce, "the most monstrous idol," who was the equivalent of the tsar. Descriptions of the Whites in noviny mirrored those of the Tartars in byliny. In these new tales, the Whites were incompetent, backwards capitalists, while the Soviet citizens became invincible heroes.

Once Stalin died in March 1953, folklorists of the period quickly abandoned the new folktales of the period. Written by individual authors and performers, noviny did not come from the oral traditions of the working class. Consequently, today they are considered pseudo-folklore, rather than genuine Soviet (or Russian) folklore. Without any true connection to the masses, there was no reason noviny should be considered anything other than contemporary literature. Specialists decided that attempts to represent contemporary life through the structure and artistry of the ancient epics could not be considered genuine folklore. Stalin's name has been omitted from the few surviving pseudo-folktales of the period. Instead of considering folklore under Stalin a renaissance of the traditional Russian epic, today it is generally regarded as a period of restraint and falsehoods.

== Types ==
=== Folktales ===
Evidence of Russian folktales exists as early as the 12th century, and indicates it had been around for some time earlier. Not much content from early folktales exists today, however, largely due to suppression of non-Christian narratives by the Church. Telling folktales was strictly forbidden at least as early as the 12th century, and in some cases transgression led to death. It was only by the 16th century that Russian folktales began getting recorded, and only by the 19th century with Bogdan Bronitsyn's "Russian Folk Tales" (1838) that a compilation of genuine Russian folktales was published. Study of folklore gained particular popularity in the late 20th century (around the 1960s).

There have been several attempts to classify European folklore, and one notable system was begun by Finnish folklorist Antti Aarne, and later developed by Leningrad professor N. P. Andreyev. This system identified 915 main types of folktales (categorised by themes, plots, characters, and other story elements). Of these, about one third (317 types) were found in both Eastern and Western European tales, one third (302) types were found exclusively in Western European tales, and one third (296 types) were found exclusively in Eastern European tales.

=== Folk magic ===
There were two primary types of magic in ancient and peasant Russian culture: "unclean" (evil) magic, and productive (good) magic. The former is associated with the devil, and is generally considered hostile. The latter is protective against evil magic or seeks to produce good for the user. Some magic practices, such as divination, which were traditionally considered productive magic, were largely reassigned as unclean magic by the Christian church once it was in power. Most productive magic was "homeopathic", meaning that a symbolic action was performed with the hope of evoking a related response from reality. For example, a springtime ritual of carrying around branches with artificial birds (or cookies representing birds) on them was thought to help bring about the bird flight associated with the coming of spring. Folk magic traditions have been recorded as persisting as late as 1648 in Moscow.

==== Holiday rituals ====
Practices associated with many holidays have their origin as magic rituals. Yuletide and New Year's carolling was initially an opportunity for households to show generosity at the start of the new year, thus ensuring they would have a prosperous year. Similarly, copious feasting and carousing at Shrovetide was thought to encourage a plentiful harvest. On the first night after a wedding, sometimes the couple's bed would be set near the livestock, so that they might influence the fertility of their animals. Other wedding traditions, like eating eggs, singing bawdy songs, and throwing grain over the newlyweds were originally intended to secure fertility and prosperity for the couple in the years to come.

==== Charms ====
Charms (also, "incantations", "precautions", or "whisperings") are magic words used to accomplish a variety of tasks. Some charms might be used to banish a leshy, similar to saying "Sheep's mug, sheep's wool". Others might be used to imbue an action with magic, so that a ritual will be effective. One common structure for a charm is for it to describe an action and its intended significance, so that the person will then go perform that action and achieve the described result. For instance, one love charm begins: "I will rise, Lord's humble servant (name stated), I will come from the house into the doorway, from the doorway into the gate, ..." It is common as well for a charm to invoke God or saints. A charm against toothaches reads:

"Three paths, a tree stands by the road, under the tree a corpse lies, past the corpse goes St. Anthony and says: "Why do you, corpse, lie here? Do your teeth ache? Do your ribs hurt? Do worms eat you away? Does the blood flow out of you" "Nothing hurts." Grow numb you too, teeth of God's humble servant (name stated), like in a corpse; make him strong, Lord, stronger than a stone."

One of the oldest recorded references to Russian charms lies in the Russian Chronicle, dating to the 10th century.

== Characters ==
=== Nature and house spirits ===
Spirits were most frequently seen as the masters of their domains, whether that was forest, water, field, or home. Often they are portrayed as old men, reflecting the age-based familial hierarchy in tribal communities. Originally, nature spirits were thought to protect humans, but over time they came to be seen as neutral or malevolent forces, sometimes associated with the devil. They are also frequently associated with an "unclean" force, connected to unnatural death and improper burial. Most accounts that we have today of nature spirits were collected after the end of the 19th century and are told as second-hand tales. Run-ins with nature spirits have been reported to have been more frequent in the distant past, and less frequent nowadays.

==== Baba Yaga ====
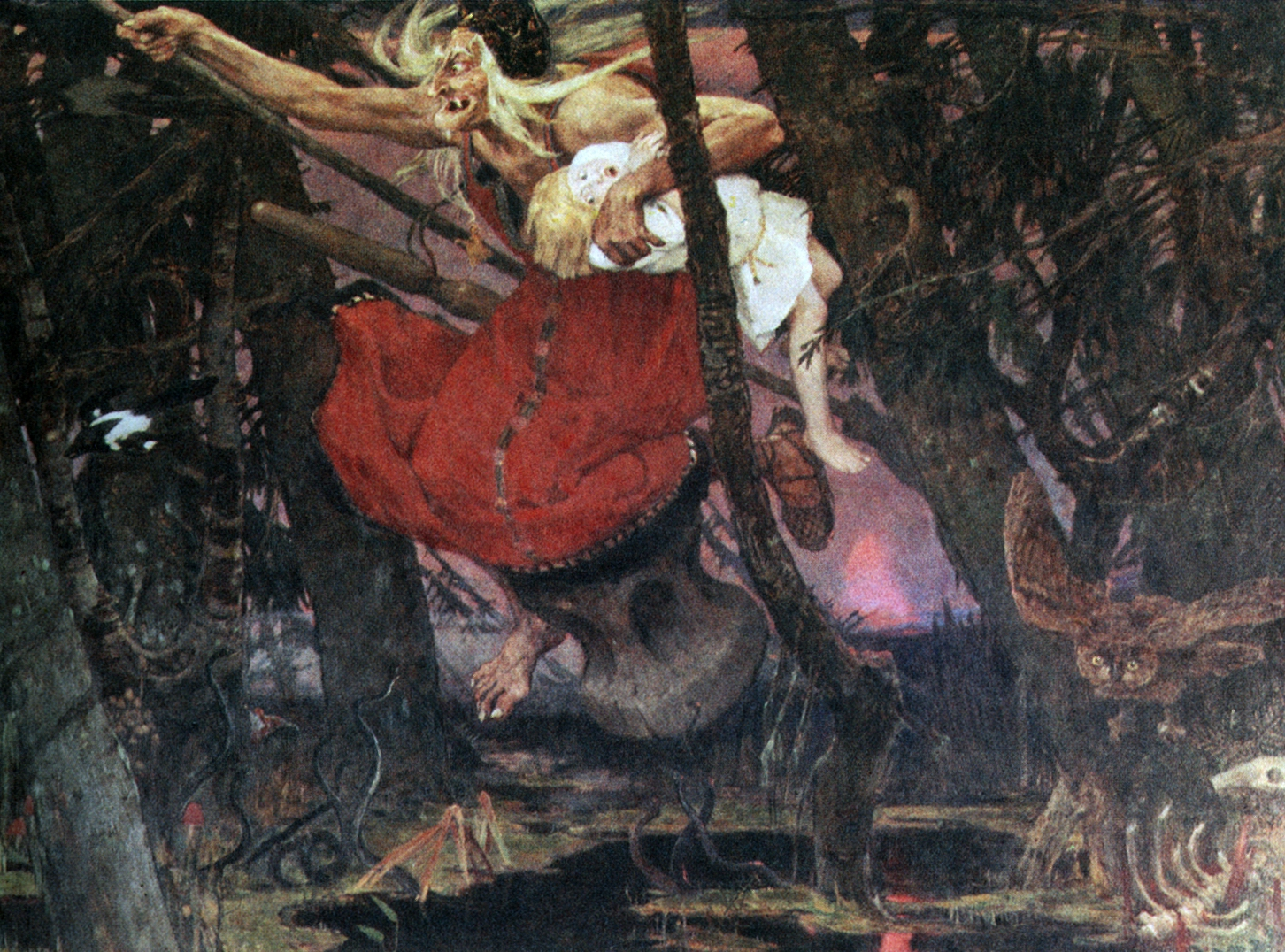
Baba Yaga

Similar to a witch, Baba Yaga is a supernatural being (or one of a trio of sisters of the same name), who appears as a deformed or ferocious-looking old woman. In Russian fairy tales, Baba Yaga flies around in a mortar, wields a pestle, and dwells deep in the forest in a hut usually described as standing on chicken legs. Baba Yaga may help or hinder those that encounter or seek her out and may play a maternal role and has associations with forest wildlife. According to Vladimir Propp's folktale morphology, Baba Yaga commonly appears as either a donor, villain, or may be altogether ambiguous.

Andrea Johns identifies Baba Yaga as "one of the most memorable and distinctive figures in eastern European folklore," and observes that she is "enigmatic" and often exhibits "striking ambiguity." Johns summarises Baba Yaga as "a many-faceted figure, in capable of inspiring researchers to see her as a Cloud, Moon, Death, Winter, Snake, Bird, Pelican, or Earth Goddess, totemic matriarchal ancestress, female initiator, phallic mother, or archetypal image".

==== Domovoy ====
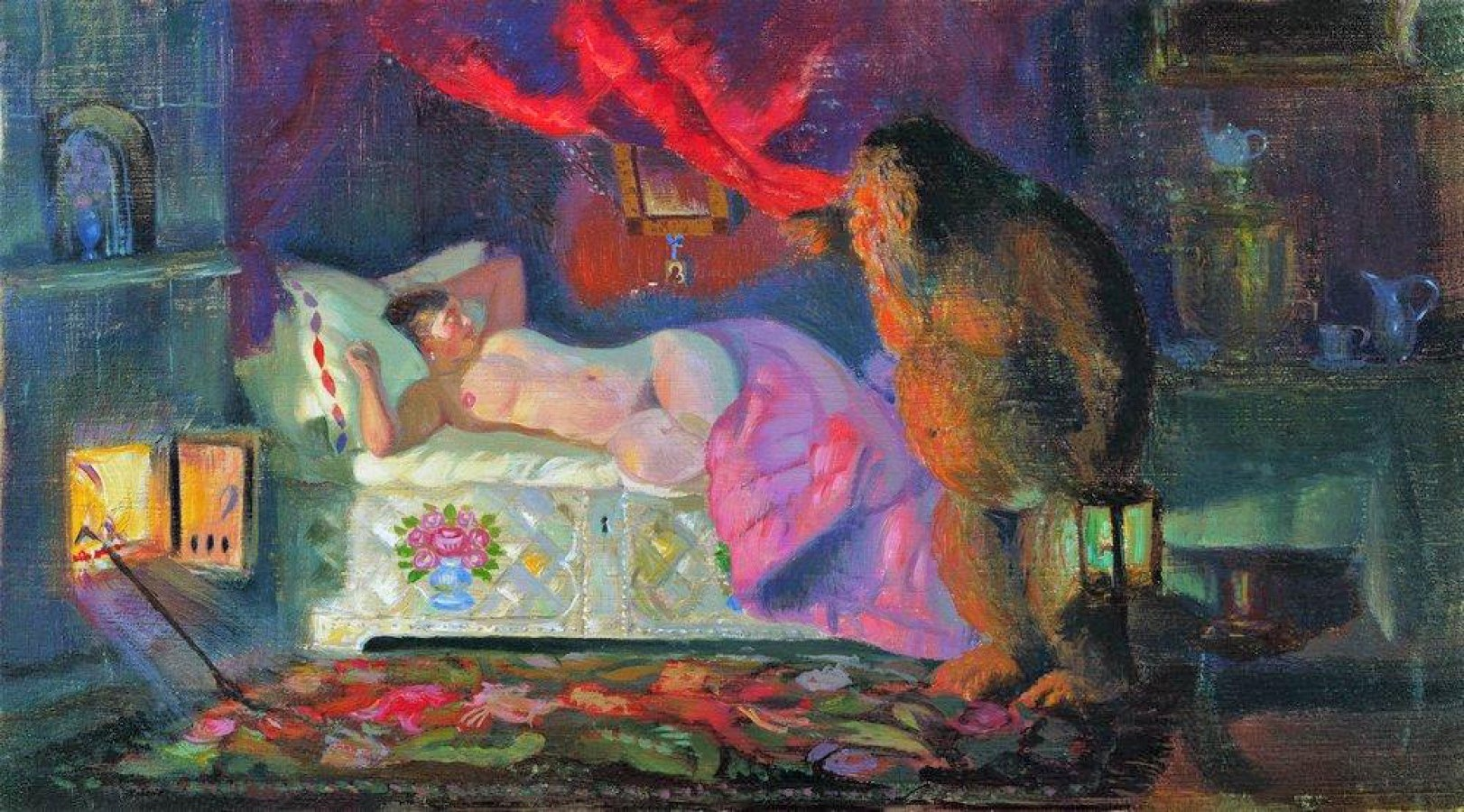
Domovoy Peeping at the Sleeping Merchant Wife by Boris Kustodiev

The domovoy or domovoi is a spirit of the house, and is somewhat different in character from the nature spirits. While mischievous, the domovoy was seen as the benign protector of the household. He was not averse to Christian symbols (such as the sign of the cross), and did not make a place dangerous like other spirits. He was likely a holdover of ancestor worship practices, as one nick-name to refer to him was "grandfather", and he was often said to appear in the form of a current or past head of the household.

However, most of the time he is seen as a hunched over, hairy old man. Typically the domovoy was perceived not by sight, but by sound. He might cause walls to creak or bang pots or sing. A domovoy was usually thought to live alone, but some accounts mention him having a wife and children.

The function of the domovoy was largely to look after a household and the livestock. One way he did this would be by offering omens of future events, such as good or bad fortune, weddings, or a death in the family. One responsibility of a household was to please its house spirit, whether that was by managing the house well, following social customs, or even selecting livestock in the preferred colour of a domovoy. This was easy to do because the domovoy was easily pleased. Having the assistance of one's domovoy was considered essential to the proper functioning of a household.

The transfer of a domovoy was an important business as well. For instance, when a woman got married, it was customary for her to leave her family and join that of her husband. When she left her home, it was necessary for her to perform rituals to separate her from her family's house spirits and acquaint her with those of her husband's family. When a family moved houses, they would specifically invite their domovoy to come with them to ensure it would remain with the household.

==== Leshy ====
A leshy (also, leshii, 'wood demon') is a forest spirit who has mastery over the woods. His appearance varies across stories, but he is consistently male. Generally the leshy is pictured as human-like, but can also appear in the form of an animal or, in one case, a mushroom. Sometimes he is depicted with wings and a tail, like the devil. Sometimes he is described as looking like someone familiar to the viewer. His size is also variable, a power which has been attributed to his role as reflecting his environment. Depending on the height of the plant life in the forest he inhabits, he would fit in with his surroundings. Some stories about the leshy describe him as having a wife and children, mimicking a typical peasant household. Some accounts attribute multiple leshie to a given forest, and describe them as having a hierarchical society, again similar to local society.

Some say the leshy cannot speak, but only makes sounds like clapping or wilderness noises (birds, rustling leaves, growls, etc.). Others say he can mimic voices of people you know.

In general, he is thought to be mischievous or evil, and has been said to make people get lost in the woods, cause people to fall ill, steal women, and even eat people. His traditional weaknesses include fire and the sign of the cross, indicative of later association between leshy and the Christian devil.

==== Vodyanoy ====
The creatures are also known as "vodianoi" ('water devil', 'water sprite'). A vodyanoy is an evil male water spirit. He is thought to inhabit a given body of water, sometimes having a dwelling place at the bottom of it. Like the leshy, the vodyanoy's appearance varies from story to story. He is generally pictured as an old, bearded man, sometimes blue, white, or green sometimes covered in slime, sometimes bloated with water. Often he is described as having fish-like elements, such as scales or a fish's tail. Like the leshy, the vodyanoy was sometimes pictured with a wife.

The vodyanoy's main function is drowning people. Other stories about the vodyanoy include him mimicking voices or corrupting someone to change their appearance. Some stories about amicable relations between humans and a vodyanoy describe millers and fishermen who made offerings to a vodyanoy to secure good fortune from his waters.

Unlike the leshy, the vodyanoy is seen as unequivocally evil. In many cases, he is thought of as equivalent to the devil.

==== Polevoi and Poludnitsa ====
A polevoi is a male field spirit. Like the other nature spirits, the polevoi's appearance generally reflects his environment. Sometimes he is described as having dark skin, like the soil; sometimes with grass for hair; sometimes dressed in white and surrounded by wind. Like the leshy, the polevoi has variable size based on his surroundings, and might be tall as the uncut grass in the summer and tiny as the field stubble after the harvest.

The polevoi seems generally less sinister than other spirits, the worst of his shenanigans being to make people get lost in the field. He is generally seen as a bad omen, though, and might accidentally run someone down on his horse, so people tried to avoid him by staying out of the fields at noon, when he was most likely to be about. The polevoi was thought to have a family and children.

A poludnitsa is a female field spirit, and is largely spoken of as fictitious. Her appearance varies primarily with regard to age; she has been described as a girl or an elderly woman. She is thought to protect the grain, and also to harm anyone working in the fields at noon.

==== Rusalka ====
Akin to a water fairy or undine, the rusalka is a female spirit, often associated with the water. She is usually thought to look like a young, beautiful woman. Accounts have placed rusalki in forests, in fields, and by rivers. She is typically thought to live underwater, like the vodyanoy, and to walk about on land playing tricks on unsuspecting passersby. In some places rusalki are thought to be the souls of still-born or unbaptised children, or of those who died by drowning.

Sometimes her mischief is as harmless as leading people astray, like the leshy or polevoi; other times she is thought to tickle people to death or drown them. Rusalka's connection with the unclean dead makes her a bearer of the unclean force associated with other nature spirits. Sometimes she is associated directly with the devil. Like other nature spirits, she is thought to be weakened by the sign of the cross and certain magic words.

There is a springtime festival called Rusalia (Rusal'naia Week or Green week), where rusalki are thought to wander farther from their watery homes. The name for the festival might come from the Roman festival of roses, Rusalii, or rosalia, dies rosarum. During this week, villagers commemorated past ancestors and invoked the name of rusalki during springtime rituals like decorating homes with fresh-cut birch branches or leaving fried eggs by designated birch trees. The role of the rusalka in this holiday is somewhat unclear. Some believe she is associated with ancestor worship, but others believe she is only associated with unclean dead (i.e., those who died not of natural causes and did not receive a proper burial). Additionally, the unclean force is generally associated with corrupting a place to make it dangerous and blighted, but while the rusalka is "unclean" she is also thought to promote plant growth.

=== Animals ===
Animals occur alongside human characters, as well as alongside other animals. Some of the most common animals found throughout many folktales and Russian fairy tales (skazki), are foxes, sheep, goats, roosters, bears and wolves. These animals are sometimes given human qualities, including the ability to speak both with other animals as well as human characters. They have the same emotions as human characters as well. They are given human qualities such as wit, humour, slyness and even stupidity. The characteristics of these animals have persisted through time.

Foxes

Portrayed as witty females, foxes in Russian fairy tales would often trick their counterparts. This can be adult humans, wolves, roosters and bears.

Roosters

In Russian fairy tales the rooster is associated with the sun, as well as good fortune and fertility. Hens often laid golden eggs and made their owners rich. "Russia a cultural resource guide" Roosters can be found all over many household items and often when there are two roosters with their heads together it was as a wedding gift to wish the bride and groom a good marriage.

Bears

According to Russia: A Cultural Resource Guide, its Russian name (med'ved) means "one who knows where the honey is". It was an ancestor of the Russian people and is friendly. Oftentimes people will be changed into bears as a punishment or will often appear as a wise old man. The Bear symbolises strength, power, might, warmth, and protection.

Wolves

Often portrayed as male and a villain in most Russian fairy tales. These creatures were not very smart and often susceptible to being led into traps and being tricked out of food or prey by foxes. According to one source, people were not allowed to eat wolves because it was believed the meat would turn them into a werewolf. Wolves stood for wild untamed nature and were respected and feared.

Zmey Gorynych

Its name means "Snake of the Mountains". The Slavic version of a dragon, this creature is said to have three or more heads and like other creatures in Russian fairy tales, they know how to talk. They are usually male and can be found in forests or mountains. It is said that when he flies he is so large that he blocks out the sun.

Alkonost

Portrayed as a woman-headed bird, this creature is similar to a siren and can actually change the weather depending on what mood she is in. It is said that they lay eggs in the water and when in the water the weather is calm but once it hatches there is a storm.

Indrik

In the Dove Book and Russian folklore, Indrik the Beast (Russian: Индрик-зверь, romanised: Indrik zver, lit. 'Indrik Beast') is a fabulous beast, the king of all animals, who lives on a mountain known as "The Holy Mountain" where no other foot may tread. When it stirs, the Earth trembles. The word "Indrik" is a distorted version of the Russian word edinorog (unicorn). The Indrik is described as a gigantic bull with legs of a deer, the head of a horse and an enormous horn in its snout, making it vaguely similar to a rhinoceros. The Russian folklore creature gives its name to a synonym of Paraceratherium, Indricotherium, the biggest land mammal ever to live.

== Gallery ==
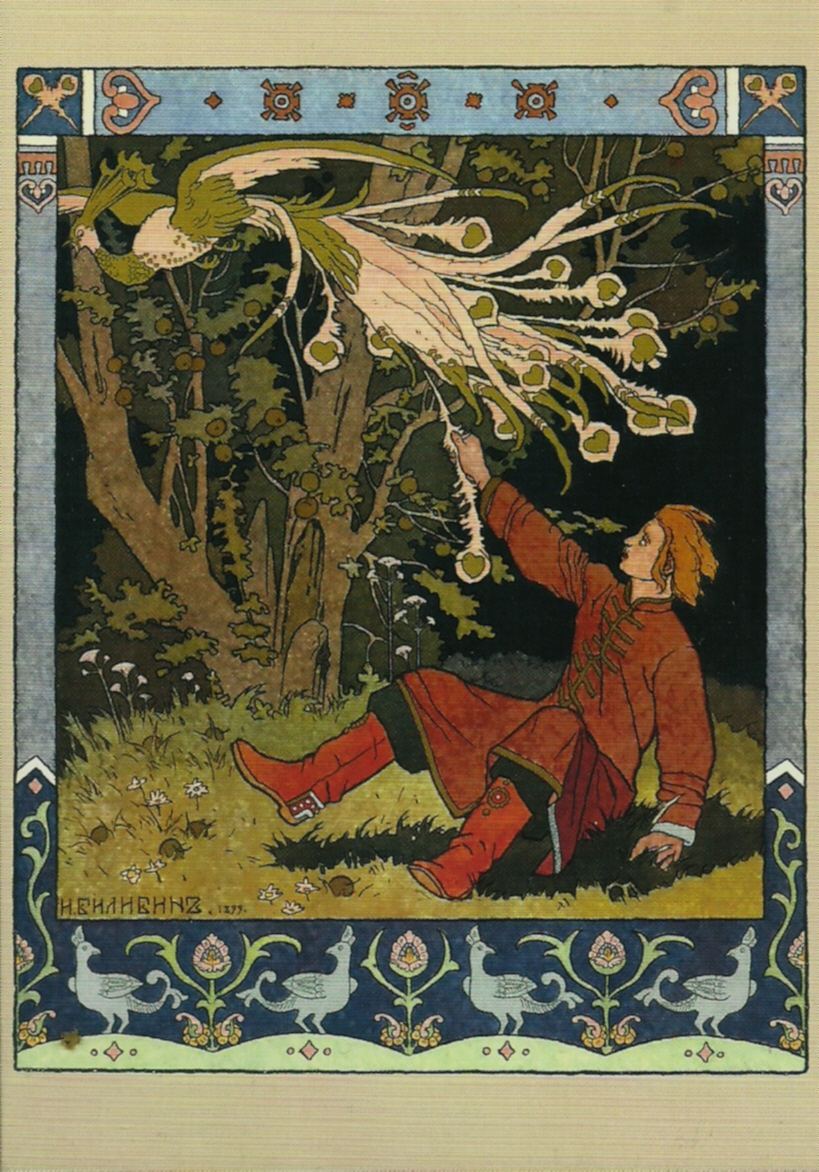
Firebird by Ivan Bilibin

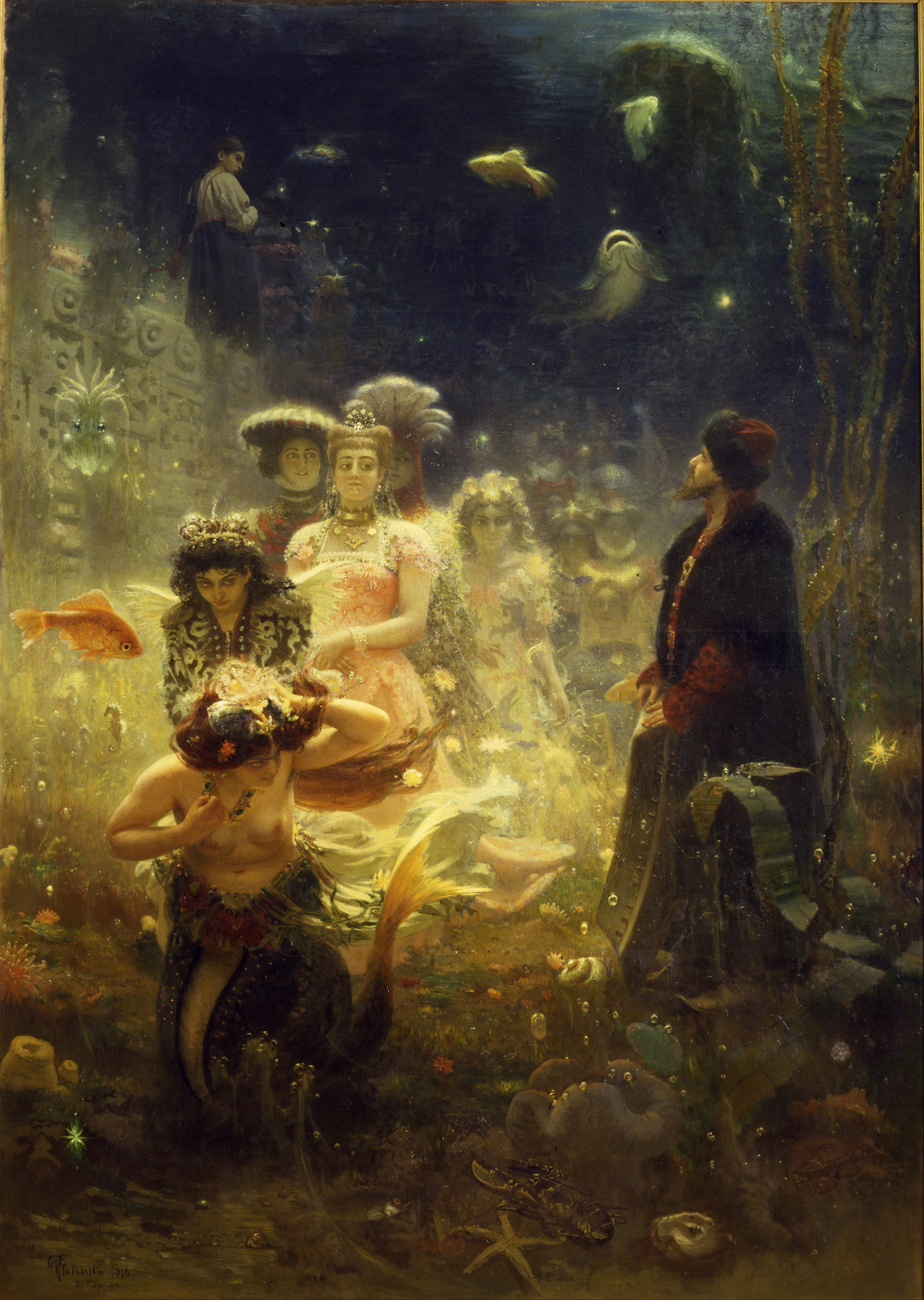
Sadko by Ilya Repin

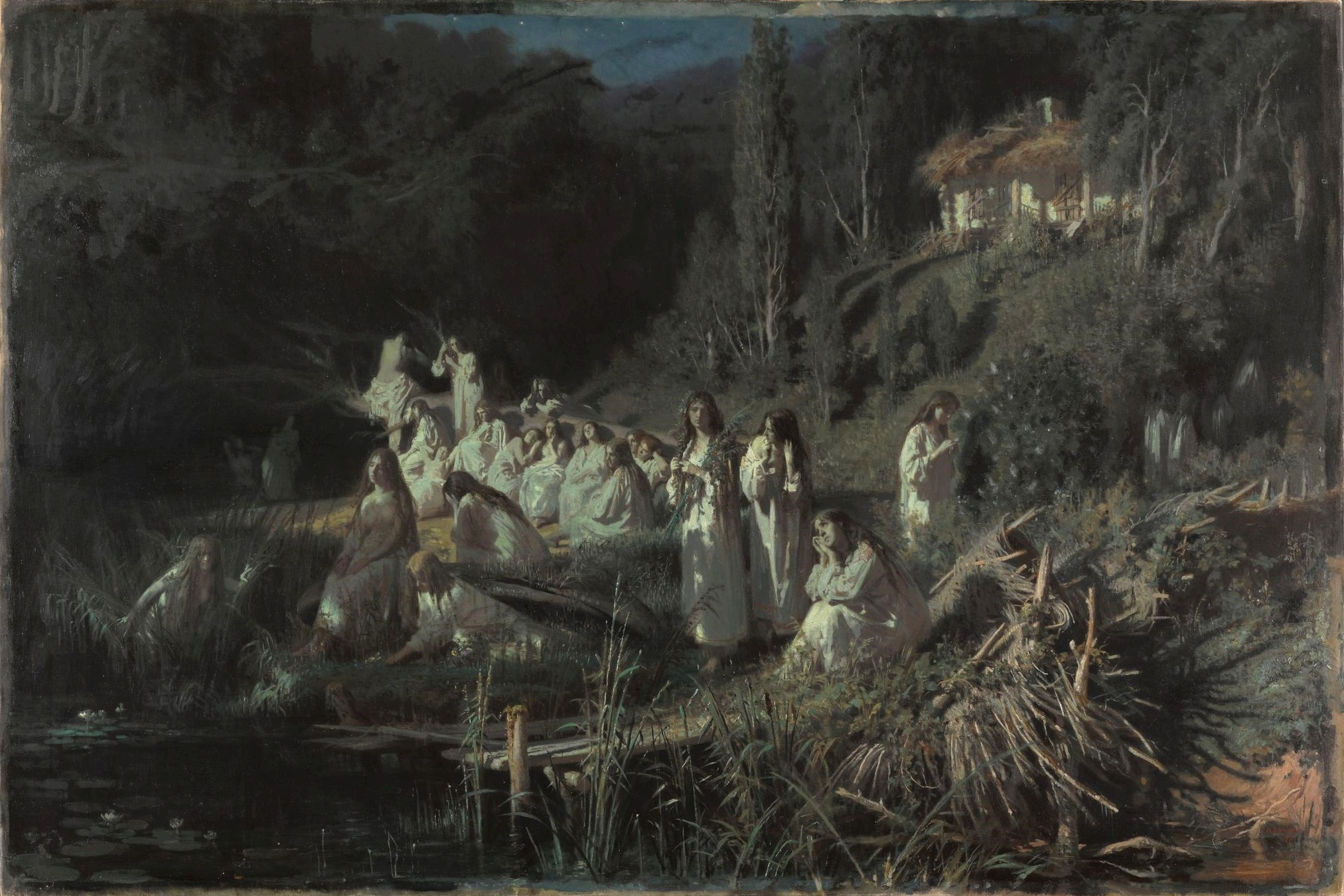
The Mermaids by Ivan Kramskoi

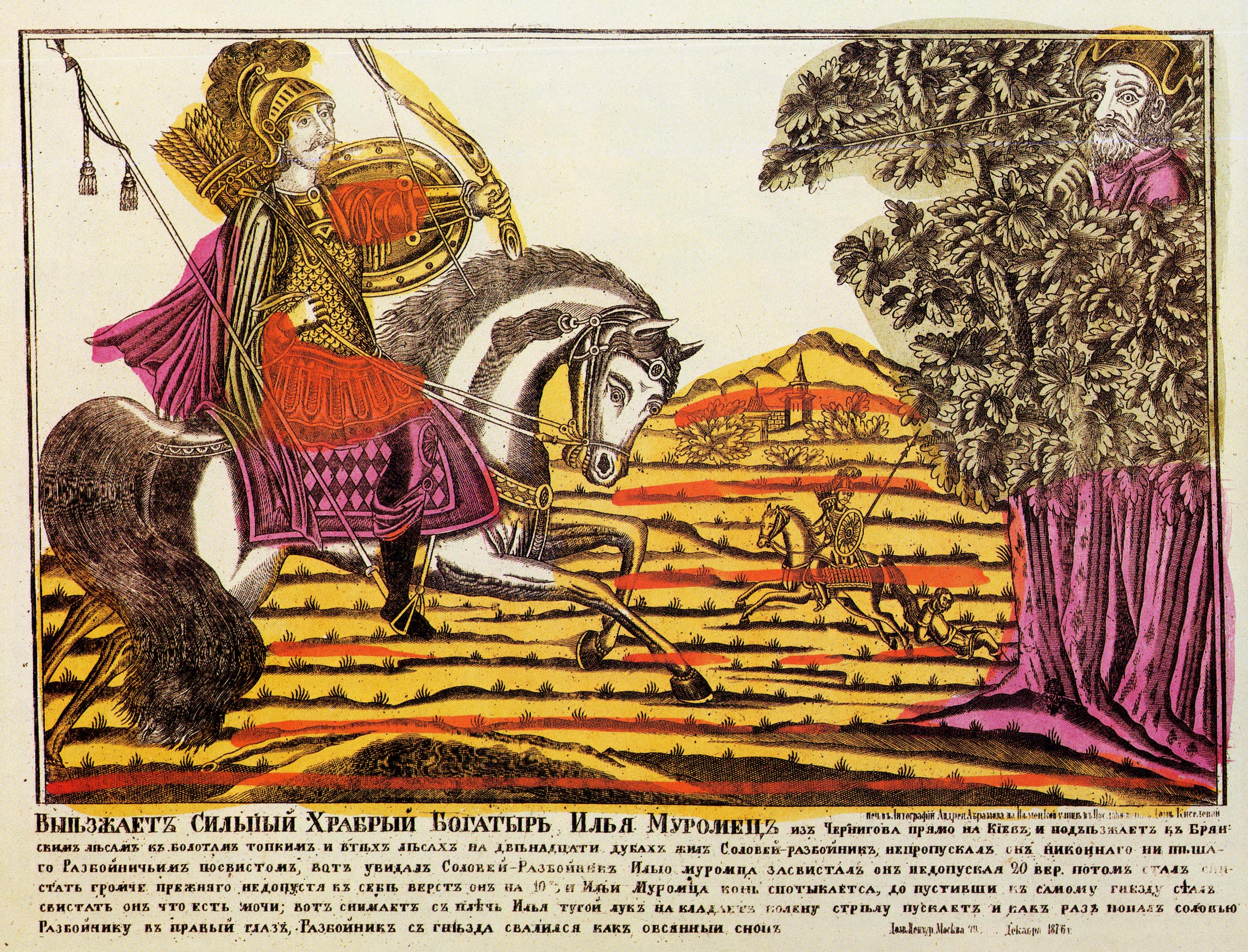
Ilya Muromets and Nightingale the Robber (19th century lubok)

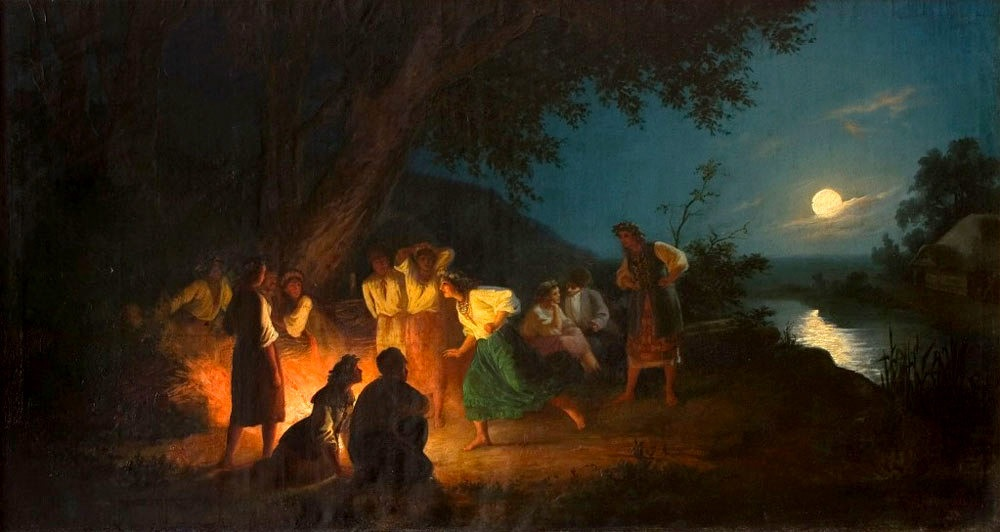
Ivan Kupala Day by Henryk Siemiradzki

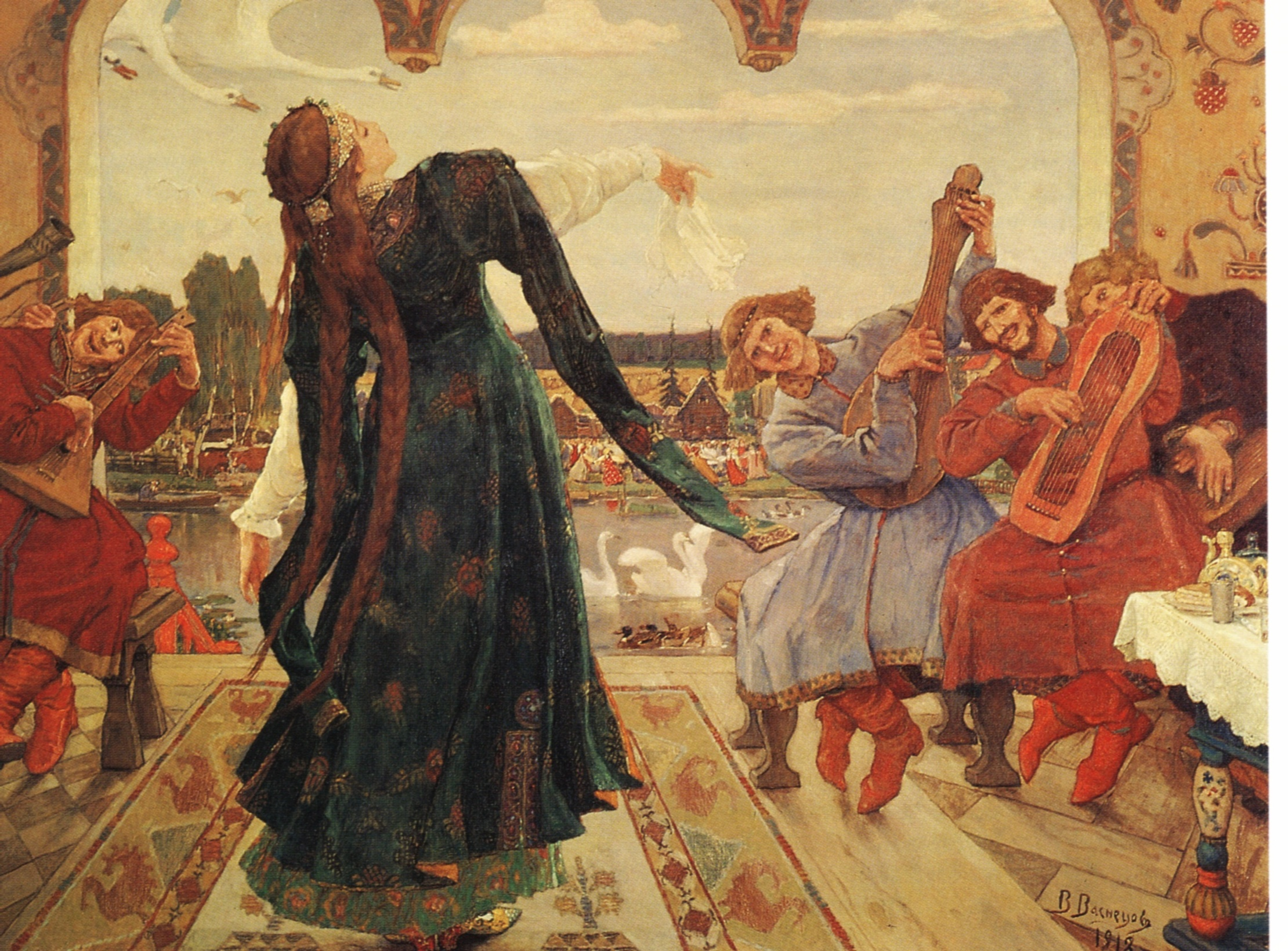
Tsarevna-Frog by Viktor Vasnetsov

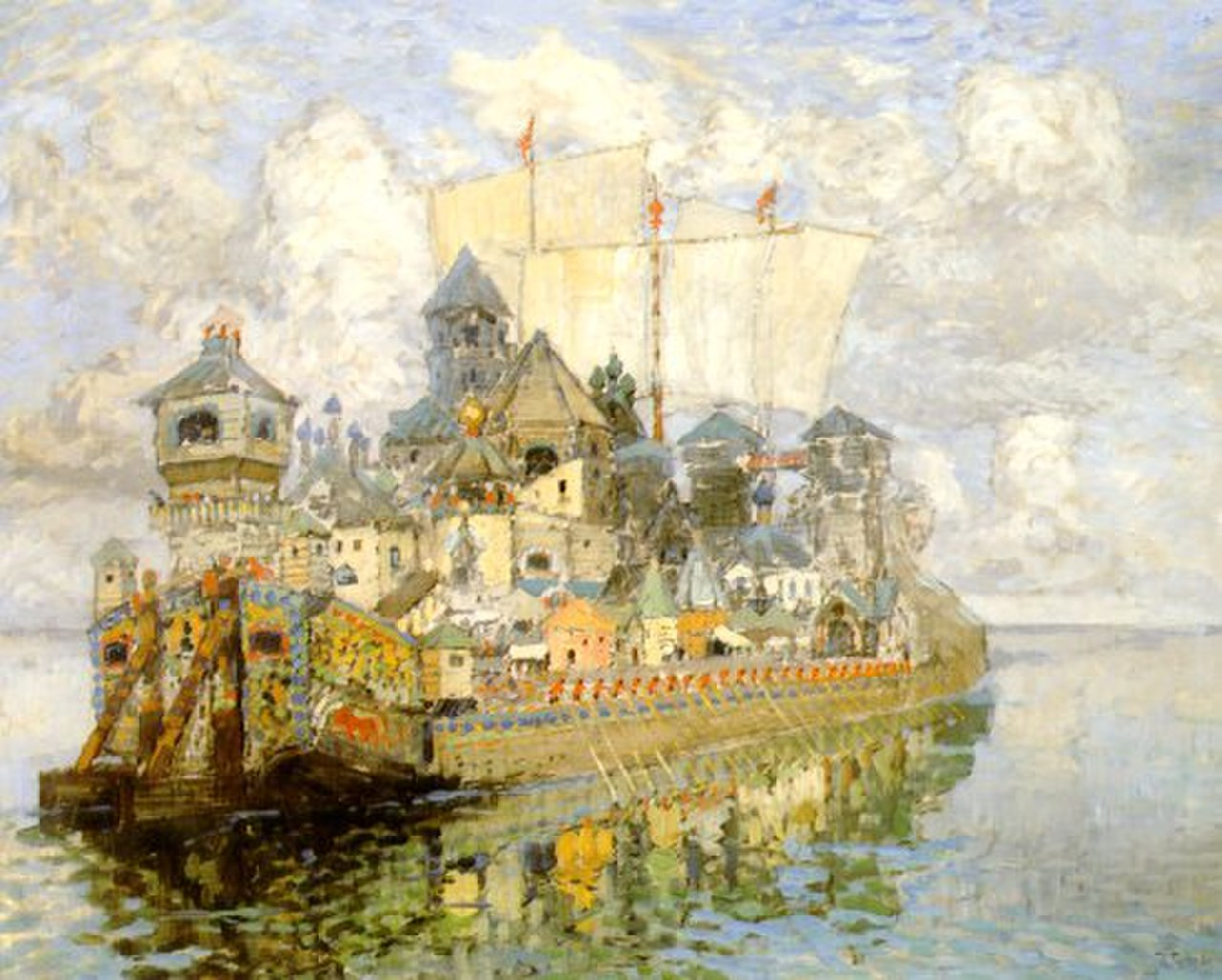
Kitezh by Konstantin Gorbatov

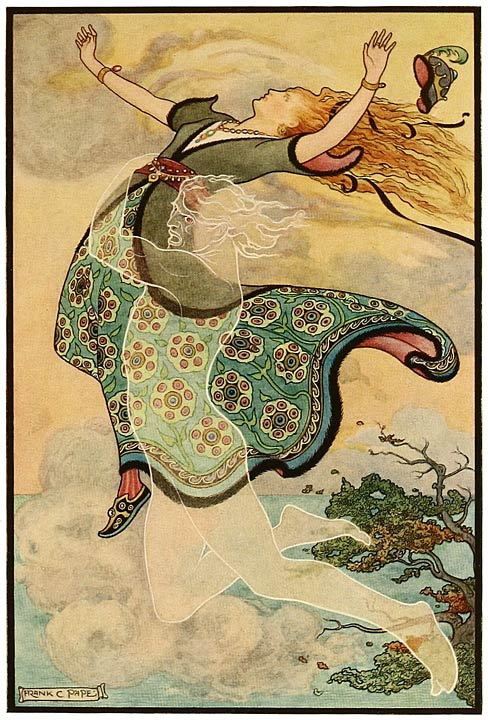
Illustration from The Russian Story Book by Richard Wilson, illustrated by Frank C. Papé (1916)

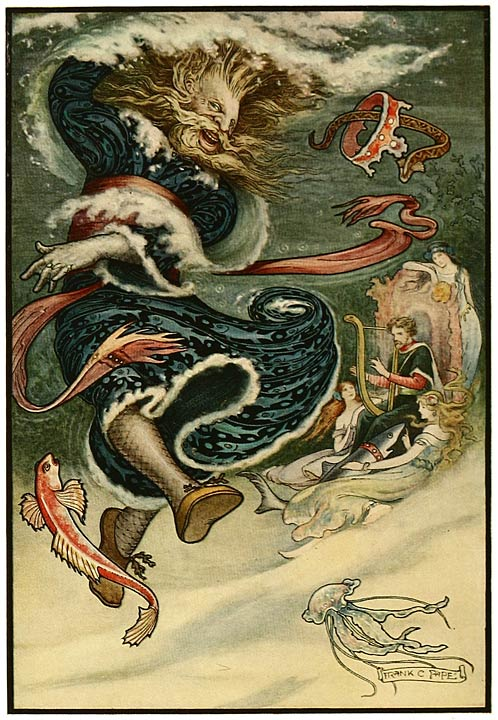
Sea Tsar. Illustration from The Russian Story Book by Richard Wilson, illustrated by Frank C. Papé (1916)

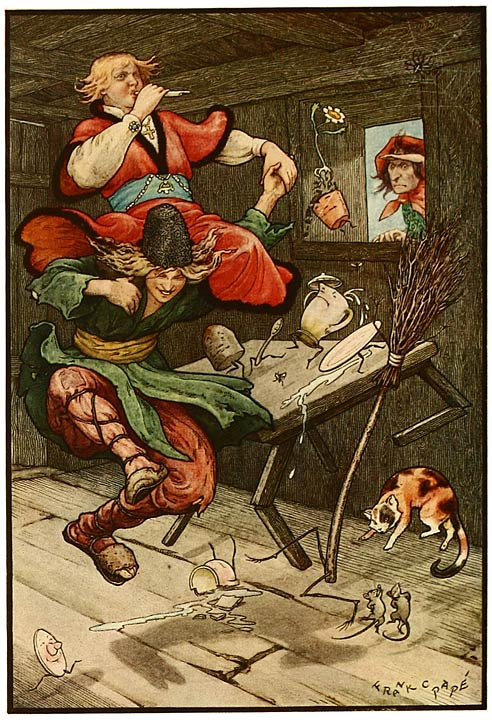
Illustration from The Russian Story Book by Richard Wilson, illustrated by Frank C. Papé (1916)

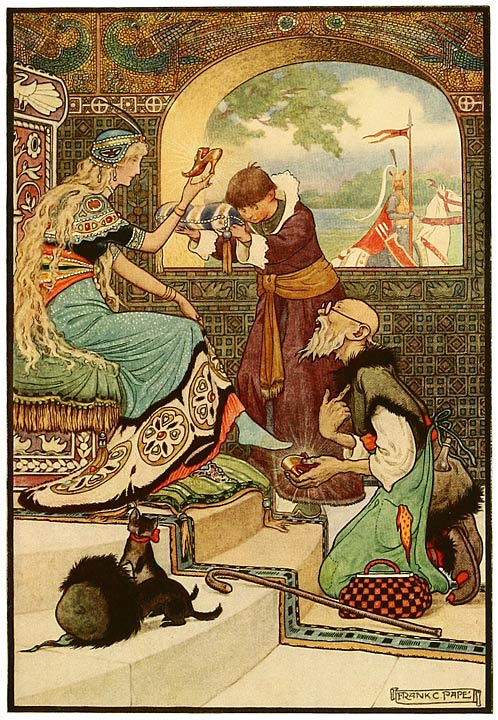
Illustration from The Russian Story Book by Richard Wilson, illustrated by Frank C. Papé (1916)

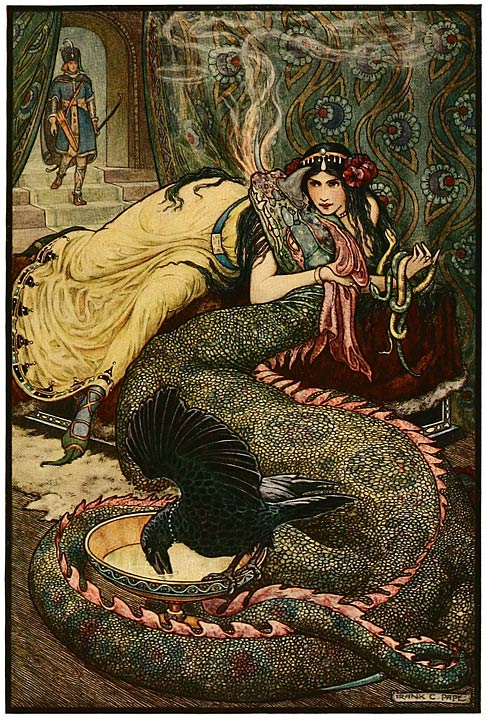
Illustration from The Russian Story Book by Richard Wilson, illustrated by Frank C. Papé (1916)

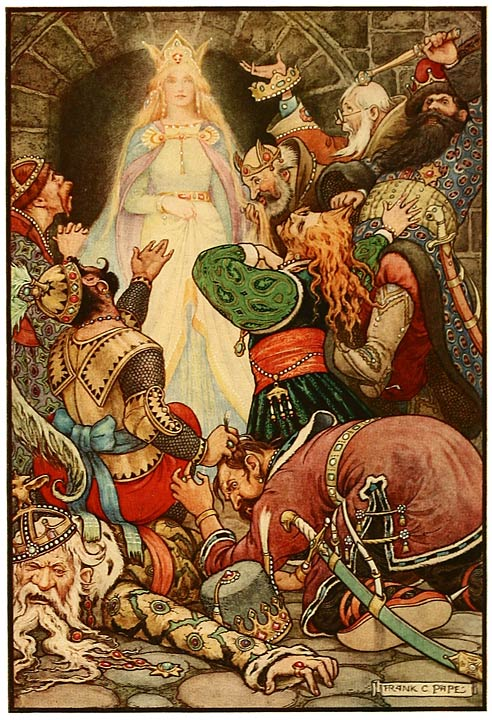
Illustration from The Russian Story Book by Richard Wilson, illustrated by Frank C. Papé (1916)

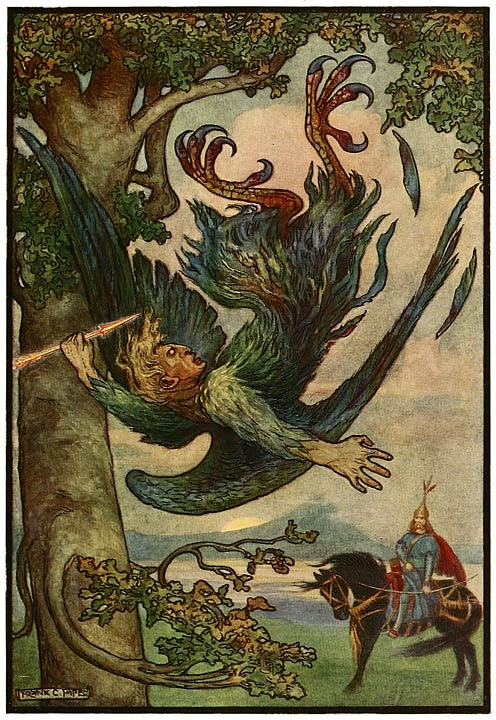
Nightingale the Robber. Illustration from The Russian Story Book by Richard Wilson, illustrated by Frank C. Papé (1916)

== See also ==
- Finnic mythologies
- Turkic mythology
- Russian folk dance
- Russian fairy tale
- Russian traditions and superstitions
