= Dheghom =

Earth-goddess in Proto-Indo-European mythology

- Venerated in: Proto-Indo-European mythology

Equivalents
- Greek: Gaia
- Hindu: Prithvi
- Germanic: Jörd
- Lithuanian: Žemyna

Dheghom (Proto-Indo-European: *dʰéǵʰōm or *dʰǵʰōm; lit. 'earth'), or *Pl̥th₂éwih₂ (*pl̥th₂éwih₂, lit. 'the Broad One'), is the reconstructed name of the Earth-goddess in the Proto-Indo-European mythology.

The Mother Earth (*Dʰéǵʰōm Méh₂tēr) is generally portrayed as the vast (*pl̥th₂éwih₂) and dark (*dʰengwo-) abode of mortals, the one who bears all things and creatures. She is often paired with Dyēus, the daylight sky and seat of the never-dying and heavenly gods, in a relationship of contrast and union, since the fructifying rains of Dyēus bring nourishment and prosperity to local communities through formulaic invocations. Dheghom is thus commonly associated in Indo-European traditions with fertility, growth, and death, and is conceived as the origin and final dwelling of human beings.

== Name and etymology ==
The Proto-Indo-European (PIE) word for 'earth', Dheghom (acc. *dʰǵʰ-ém-m, gen. *dʰǵʰ-mós), is among the most widely attested words in Indo-European languages (cf. Albanian dhé and toka; Hittite tēkan, tagān; Sanskrit kṣám; Greek khthṓn; Latin humus; Avestan zam; Tocharian tkaṃ; Old Irish dú, Lithuanian žẽmė; Old Slavonic zemlja), which makes it one of the most securely reconstructed PIE terms. On the other hand, the linguistic evidence for the ritualization of the name *dʰéǵʰōm is not systematically spread across the inherited traditions, as she also appears under other names and epithets, principally *pl̥th₂éwih₂ (the 'Broad One').

If the PIE Earth-goddess is reliably reconstructed under the name Dheghom, with *pl̥th₂éwih₂ being one of her epithets, she was most likely the Earth herself conceived as a divine entity, rather than a goddess of the earth, Proto-Indo-European mythology still relying on a strong animistic substrate.

== Epithets ==
Based on comparative analysis of textual and epigraphic evidence, historical linguists and philologists have been able to reconstruct with a comfortable level of certainty several epithets and expressions that were associated with Dheghom in Proto-Indo-European times: *Pl̥th₂éwih₂ (the 'Broad One'), *Dʰéǵʰōm Méh₂tēr ('Mother-Earth'), and, in this form or a similar one, *Dʰéǵʰōm Dʰengwo- ('Dark Earth').

=== The Broad One ===
The commonest epithet applied to the earth in Indo-European poetic traditions is *pl̥th₂éwih₂ (the 'Broad One'), which is the feminine form of *pléth₂-us, meaning 'flat, vast, broad'. A group of cognates appear in various divine names, including the Vedic earth-goddess Pṛth(i)vī, the Greek nymph Plataia, the Gaulish goddess Litavī, and Norse Fold (a name of Jörð). The epithet is also attested in nearly identical poetic expressions associating *dʰéǵʰōm and *pl̥th₂éwih₂: Avestan ząm pərəθβīm ('broad earth'), Sanskrit kṣā́m ... pṛthivī́m ('broad earth'), and Old Hittite palḫiš ... dagan(-zipaš) ('broad ... earth[-genius]').

Another similar epithet is the 'All-Bearing One', the one who bears all things and creatures. She was also referred to as 'much-nourishing' or 'rich-pastured' in Vedic, Greek, and Old Norse ritual expressions sharing the root *plh₁u- ('much').

In the Proto-Indo-European cosmology, the earth *Dʰéǵʰōm was likely perceived as a vast, flat and circular continent surrounded by waters ('The Ocean').

=== Mother Earth ===
The Earth-goddess was widely celebrated with the title of 'mother' (*méh₂tēr), and often paired with *Dyḗus ph_{2}tḗr, the 'sky-father'. She is called annas Dagan-zipas ('Mother Earth-genius') in Hittite liturgy, and paired with the Storm-god of heaven, as well as Mat' Syra Zemlya ('Mother Moist Earth') in the Russian epic poems. (Note: Professor Małgorzata Oleszkiewicz-Peralba states the character of "Mother Moist Earth" was worshipped by the Eastern Slavs, while a deity called Holy Earth was venerated by the Western Slavs.) To the Vedic goddess of the earth Prithvi is often attached the epithet Mata ('mother') in the Rigveda, especially when she is mentioned together with Dyaus, the sky-father.

úpa sarpa mātáram Bhū́mim etā́m uruvyácasam Pṛthivī́ṃ suśevām
Slip in to this Mother Earth, the wide-extending Broad One, the friendly...

— 10.18.10, in The Rigveda, translated by M. L. West.

The Baltic earth-goddess Zemyna is likewise associated with the epithets 'Mother of the Fields' and 'Mother of the Forests'. She is also treated respectfully as mother of humans. (Note: "According to Lithuanian myths, the god Perkunas is the brilliant son of Zemyna, Mother Earth (Zeme in Lithuanian is 'Earth'). She is the beginning of all: waters come from her depths, plants are rooted in her, animals have their existence, their lives and their support from her; men, too, call her their mother. 'Whoever hits earth with a stick, hits his own mother.'.") Similarly, the cult of the "Earth Mother" in old Slavic religion and traditions associated the earth with the progenetrix's role. (Note: "(...) In Ancient Russia, as V. L. Komarovic has convincingly demonstrated, the cult of the Earth, Mother Earth, was very narrowly linked to the cult of the ancestors, of the clan ('rod'). The earth was the mother of the family and of the clan. She was seen as a motherly body that brings forth and nurtures children. Sometimes, she is described as a person: stones were her body, roots her bones; trees and grass her hair. (...) Both for the Slavs and for the Varangians, she was the source of fertility and prosperity, and of political authority. (...)") (Note: "[Mother Earth] was also the maternal breast and womb; the black and fruitful soil. As such she was thought to carry the family, the village, and the nation, which she nurtured and protected - and ruled - like a mother. 'Mother Earth,' wrote Fedotov, 'becomes clearer to us against the background of the gens religion.' Through her the individual and the tribal ancestors were united and made whole; she conferred identity upon each person: 'The sacred motherhood of the earth is intimately akin to the worship of the parents. (...)' She was also the genetrix of the family and the clan.") In a legend from Smolensk, it is told that a human has three mothers: a birth mother (rodna) and two great (velikih) mothers, Mother Moist Earth and the Mother of God. Additionally, the Anglo-Saxon goddess Erce (possibly meaning 'bright, pure') is called the 'mother of Earth' (eorþan modor) and likely identified with Mother Earth herself in a ritual to be performed on an unfruitful plough-land. She is also called Fīra Mōdor ('Mother of men') in Old English poetry.

A similar epithet, Mother of All (Μητηρ Παντων), is ascribed to the Greek earth-goddess Gaia, as recorded for instance in Aeschylus' Prometheus Unbound (παμμῆτόρ τε γῆ; "Oh! universal mother Earth"), and in The Libation Bearers (ἰὼ γαῖα μαῖα; Mother Gaia). Likewise, several of the Orphic Hymns attach the epithet 'mother' to Earth (γαῖα θεὰ μήτηρ). In a Samaveda hymn dedicated to the Vedic fire god Agni, he is described as "rapidly ... [moving] along his mother earth". In an Atharva Veda hymn (12.1) (Pṛthvī Sūkta, or Bhūmī Sūkta), the celebrant invokes Prithvi as his Mother, because he is "a son of Earth". The word bhūmi is also used as an epithet of Prithvi meaning 'soil' and in reference to a threefold division of the universe into heavens, sky, and earth. On her own, Bhūmi is another Vedic deity with Mother-Earth attributes.

The Greek goddess of the harvest and agriculture Demeter could also be a cognate, possibly deriving from an Illyrian root dā- (from *dʰǵʰ(e)m-) attached to māter ('mother'), although this proposition remains controversial in scholarship. The Roman evidence for the idea of Earth as a mother is doubtful, as it is usually associated with the name Terra rather than Tellus (the pre-Imperial earth-goddess), and the attested tradition may have been influenced by Greek motifs.

In Albanian the Earth Mother Goddess or Great Mother (Magna Mater) is simply referred to as Dhé "Earth", and traces of her worship have been preserved in Albanian tradition.

=== Dark Earth ===
Another Proto-Indo-European epithet, *dʰéǵʰōm dʰengwo- or *dʰéǵʰōm dʰṇgu- ('dark earth'), can be reconstructed from the Hittite formulae dankuiš dagan-zipaš ('dark genius of the earth') and dankuš tēkan, which were frequently used to name the underworld, but sometimes also the earth's surface, and partially from the Albanian and Slavonic expressions dhe të zi ('black earth') and *črnā(yā) zemyā ('dark earth'), which have retained the term *dʰéǵʰōm. Other reflexes can be found in Greek Gaia Melaina (γαîα μέλαινα; 'black earth'), or in Old Irish domun donn ('brown earth'). A Lithuanian expression takes the form "may the black earth not support me".

ištamašta=an=ma palḫiš dankuiš daganzipaš
...the broad dark earth heard him...

— 4.4 Rs. 12ff, in Keilschrifturkunden aus Boghazköi, translated by J. L. García Ramón.

In Latvian dainas about plant fertility, the color black symbolized a good and abundant harvest, and the black soil was considered the most fertile. In a Russian fairy tale, the maiden is buried "under a blanket of black earth".

A formula *čṛnā(jā) zemjā ('dark earth') can be reconstructed based on expressions found in the southern Slavic-speaking area, in ritual and burial contexts, like Ukrainian čorna zemlicja (in a Christmas carol); Slovene černa zemlja (in incantations); Bulgarian černata (in relation to the Earth, in curses), oženich se zadevojka černozemka (metaphor for 'to die young'), "черна земя" ('black earth'); Serbo-Croatian zagrlila (poljubila) ga je (crna) zemlja (meaning 'he has died'); Serbian crna zemlja.

In another line of scholarship, the formula of the dark earth seems to be related to invocation or oaths, where the announcer summons the Earth as an observer or witness, as seen by Solon's elegiac Fragment 36. The Slavic deity 'Moist Earth' (Syra Zemlya) was similarly invoked during oaths and called to witness in land disputes.

== Role ==
=== Mating with the Sky Father ===
The Earth goddess was conceived as the dark dwelling of mortals, in contrast with Dyēus, the bright diurnal sky and the seat of the gods. (Note: According to Gritsay, Russian scholars E. V. Antonova and O. G. Radchenko mention that the sky is associated with a paternal figure and the elements of light and fire (e.g, epithet "свет-батюшка" 'luminous father'), in contrast with a Mother-type character, associated with water (moisture) and earth, and also called "темная" and "черная" ('dark', 'black').) Both deities often appear as a pair, the Sky Father (*Dyḗws Ph₂tḗr) uniting with Mother Earth (*Dʰéǵʰōm Méh₂tēr) to bring fertility and growth. The Earth is thus often portrayed as the giver of good things: she is exhorted to become pregnant in an Old English prayer, and Slavic peasants described Zemlja as a prophetess that shall offer favourable harvest to the community. The unions of Zeus with Semele and Demeter is similarly associated with fertility and growth in Greek mythology. According to Jackson, however, Dʰéǵʰōm is "a more fitting partner of Perk^{w}unos than of Dyēus", since the former is commonly associated with fructifying rains as a weather god.

The Earth–Heaven couple was probably not at the origin of the other heavenly gods. The Divine Twins and H_{2}éwsōs seem to have been conceived by Dyēus alone, since they are mentioned through the formulaic expressions *Diwós Népoth_{1}e ('Descendants of Dyēus') and *Diwós D^{h}uǵh_{2}tḗr ('Daughter of Dyēus), respectively.

==== Anatolian ====
In Hittite mythology, the Storm God of Heaven, one of the most important in the Hittite pantheon, has been syncretized with local Anatolian or Hattian deities, merging with a local storm god with terrestrial characteristics. At a later point, the Storm God of Heaven was paired with local goddess Wurulemu, with chthonic traits.

==== Indo-Iranian ====
In the Vedic texts, Prithvi the mother is usually paired with Dyaus the father, as shown for instance in Samaveda hymns. Due to their complementary relationship, they are celebrated as universal parents. However, other texts of sacred literature attribute different partners to the Earth goddess: in an Atharveda Hymn (12.1), Prithvi is coupled with Parjanya (Sanskrit: पर्जन्य, parjánya), a deity of rain and fertilizer of earth. In the same hymn, verse 6 (12.1.6), Indra, another Vedic deity of thunder and rain, is described as "consort" and protector of Earth.

According to Herodotus, the Scythians considered Earth to be the wife of Zeus.

==== Graeco-Roman ====
Zeus is associated with Semele, a possible descendant of Dʰéǵʰōm, but also with Demeter, which could be another cognate stemming from the Mother Earth. In the Danaids, Aeschylus describes how Ouranos and Chthôn are seized by a mutual desire for sexual intercourse: the rain falls, then Earth conceives and brings forth pasture, cereal crops, and foliage. Likewise, "Heaven and Earth" regularly appear as a duo among deities invoked as witnesses to Hittite treaties, and the Roman Tellus Mater is paired with Jupiter in Macrobius's Saturnalia.

The mating of Zeus and female characters with chthonic elements (Démeter) or associated with earth (such as Semele, Plataia and Themis) may be a remnant of the Sky/Earth coupling. Other religious expressions and formulas in Greek cultic practice attest to a wedding or union between a sky-god and an earth-mother: the Homeric Hymn to Gaia calls her "Wife of Starry Ouranos"; weddings in Athens were dedicated to both Ouranos and Gaia; an Orphic Hymn tells that the cultist is both "a child of Earth and starry Sky"; in Athens, there was a statue of Gaia on the Acropolis depicting her beseeching Zeus for rain; (Note: On that note, the epithet ὀμβροχαρής ('delighting in rain') - a Hapax legomenon - is attached to the Earth in an Orphic Hymn.) Zeus Chthonios and Gê Chthonia form a cultic pair in Mykonos; Zeus is invoked with an Earth Mother partner by their priestesses in Dodona; a funerary epigram of one Lycophron of Pherai, son of Philiskos, states he shall live "among the stars uplifted by his father" (Zeus), while his body "occupies mother earth".

In the cosmogony of Pherecydes of Syros, male deity Zas (identified with Zeus and the celestial/heavenly heights) unites with female character Chthonie (associated with the earth and the subterranean depths) in sacred rites of marriage, a union that appears to hark back to "the theology of the rites of fertility-fecundity" and lays the foundation of the cosmos;

Ancient Roman scholar Varro, in his book De re rustica, listed five divine pairs, among which Juppiter, "father", and Tellus, "the Earth mother", both responsible for the fruitfulness of agriculture.

==== Norse ====
In Norse mythology, the goddess Jörd, a jötunn (giantess) whose name means 'earth' (from Proto-Germanic *erþō-, 'earth, soil, land'), begets the thunder-god Thor (Donar) with Odinn–not a sky-god, although a chief god of the Norse pantheon. A line in the Gylfaginning by Norse poet Snorri Sturluson mentions that the Earth is both daughter and wife ("Jörðin var dóttir hans ok kona hans") of the All-Father, identified as Odinn.

==== Slavic ====
Russian scholar O. G. Radchenko points that remnants of the coupling exist in East Slavic riddles, incantations and herb charms. As pointed by scholarship, Croatian historian Natko Nodilo saw an occurrence of the Masculine Heavens and Feminine Earth in the riddle Visok tata, plosna mama, bunovit zet, manita devojka ("Tall father, fat mother, rebellious son-in-law, frenzied maiden"), about the components of the world, and whose answer is "Sky, Earth, Wind and Fog". In a Russian incantation (Beschwörungsformel), heaven and earth are referred to as a father/mother pair: Ty nebo otec; ty zemlja mat'. ("You Heaven are father; you Earth are mother"). (Note: "Some remnants of fertilizing rites still point in the direction that there might have been a marriage between earth and heaven in the primitive mythology of Eastern Slavs".) A folk expression "plaskófka matka, vysoki tatka" refers to "the low, flat earth" in contrast with "the highest sky".

Polish scholarship also indicates some holdover of the idea exists in the folklore of Poland, for instance, in folk riddle Matka nisko, ojciec wysoko, córka ślepa, syn szalony ("A mother low down, a father high up, a blind daughter and a mad son"), whose answer is "earth, heaven, night, wind". (Note: "In folk cosmogonic myths, the male sky fertilises the earth (SSSL 1(2): 17–56), the act being described as "the sacred union (hierogamy) between the Sky-God and the Earth-Mother" (Eliade 1961, after Cummings n.d.). (...) Echoes of the hierogamy can be found in a Polish folk riddle: "Father shoots but doesn't kill; mother eats, though it has no mouth", which stands for the heaven–rain–earth complex. In peasant poems, heaven embraces the earth with love: at the crossroads, where Christ dies, heaven embraces the earth and presents the Mother of Bread with a herb-and-wheat wreath.")

In a charm collected in Arkhangelsky and published in 1878 by historian Alexandra Efimenko (ru), the announcer invokes "Mother-Earth" (Земля мать) and "Father Heaven" (небо отец). According to researcher Natalya Polyakova, there was among the Slavs an old belief that earth was fertilized by the heavenly rains and that it was a sin to profane her. If this happened, the heavenly father would no longer send her rains, and thus would cause drought.

==== Baltic ====
Baltic scholarship recognizes in ancient Baltic beliefs a division of the world into a heavenly half, with masculine and dynamic attributes and associated with light and celestial bodies, and an earthly half, feminine and static, related to plants and waters.

According to Lithuanian ethnologue Nijolė Laurinkienė, in Baltic tradition, it was said that the earth closed off (as in "sleeping" or "hibernating") near the end of autumn/beginning of winter, and "opened up" with the coming of the spring - a season when the first rains begin to fall. For this reason, it was believed that Baltic thunder god Perkūnas acted as the "opener" of the earth with his rains, making the grass grow and bringing life anew. In later tradition, it seems this deity was replaced by Saint George (Jurgis, Yurja, Sveti Juraj), who, in folksongs, was described as opening the earth in the spring with a key. (Note: The worship of Saint George with the coming of springtime also occurs in South Slavic tradition.)

=== Final dwelling of mortals ===
Dʰéǵʰōm had a connection with both death and life: the deceased are made from her and shall eventually return to her, but the crop also grows from her moist soil fertilized by the rain of Dyēus. This points to a hierarchical conception of the status of mankind regarding the heavenly gods, confirmed by the widespread use of the term 'mortal' as a synonym of 'human' rather than 'living species' in Indo-European traditions. In a Hittite military oath, the earth is said to drink the blood of the fallen ("This not wine, it is your blood, and as the earth has swallowed this..."), as in Aeschylus's Seven Against Thebes (736) and in the Indian Mahabharata ("... the earth shall drink today the blood of their king").

The word for 'earth' underlies the many formations for designating humans, because they are seen as 'earthly' or fashioned from the earth itself. It is reconstructed in the derivative forms *dʰǵʰ(e)-mōn and *dʰǵʰom-yos, which underwent a semantic shift from 'earthling' to 'human': Sanskrit jmán ('from the earth') and kṣámyaḥ ('earthly'), Latin homō ('man'), Gothic guma ('man'), Old Lithuanian žmuõ ('man') and Old Prussian smoy ('man'), Old Irish duine ('man'), and Gaulish -xtonio (*gdonios 'man'?). The Neo-Phrygian term zemelōs (ζεμελως) is interpreted as meaning 'men', or 'terrestrial' as opposed to 'heavenly'. In the words of linguist Antoine Meillet, those metaphors go back to a time when it was "natural to designate 'humans' by the distinctive features that distinguish them from the gods: mortality, life on earth".

==== Albanian ====
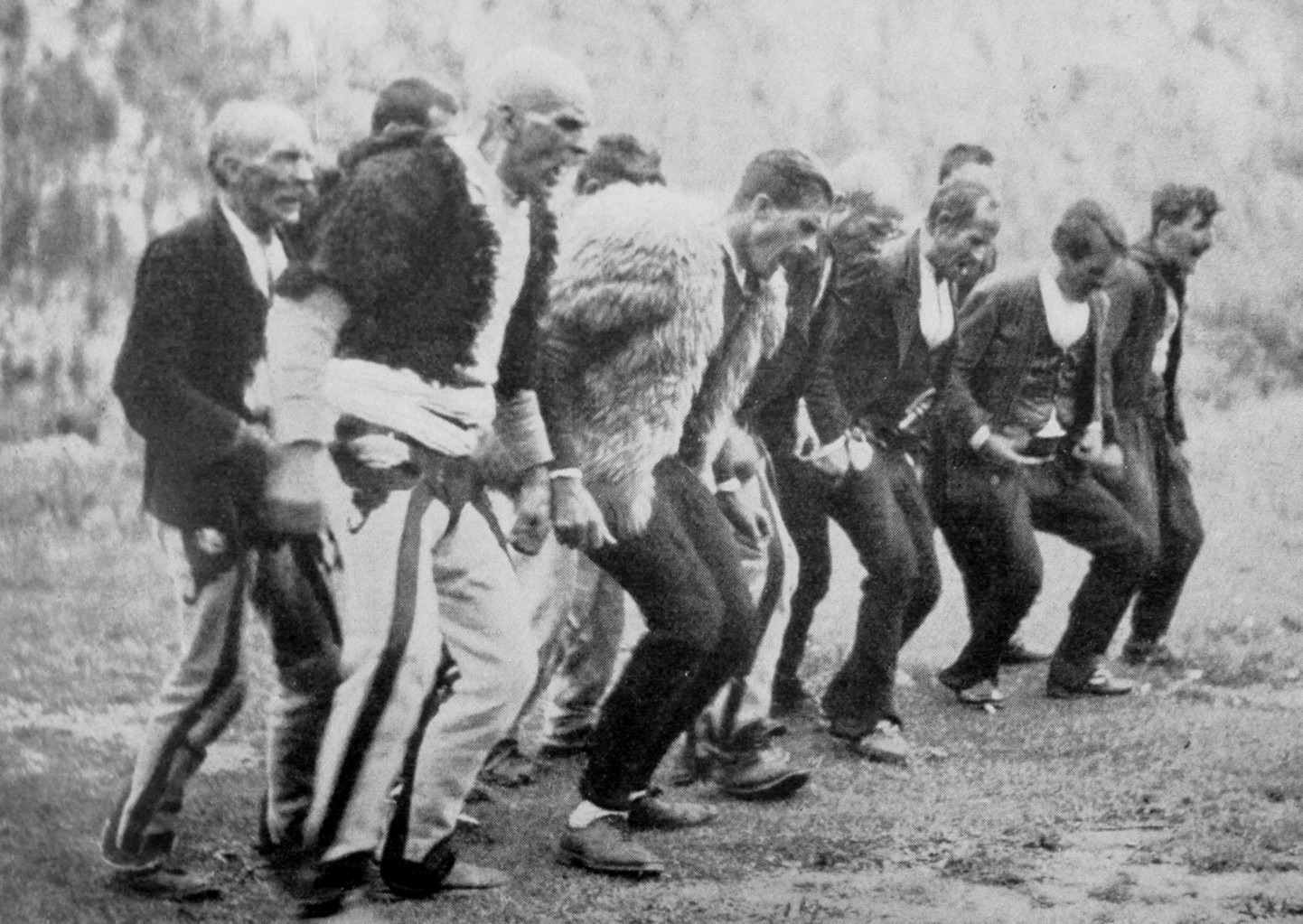
Practicing of Gjâma, the Albanian traditional lamentation of the dead, by the men of Theth (Shala) in the funeral of Ujk Vuksani, 1937.

In Albanian tradition the Earth – Dheu or Toka – is deeply respected so that she will carefully receive the dead in her chest. For instance, during the last phase of the Albanian traditional mourning practice – Gjâma – after a usual lament, the mourners sit on their knees in a row and continuing the last call of the dead person, they sit on the ground, put their foreheads upon the earth and caress the earth with their hands, as if they want to express love and care for the earth. They stay like this until someone of the house, specifically charged with this task, goes and lifts them up.

In all Albanian lands the burial custom required to put a metal coin in the grave, inserting it in the dead's hand or mouth, or on one side of the body. A general explanation was that it served "to pay for the place of the grave" or "to pay the Earth so that she keeps the dead inside her". This is a reflection of the cult of the Earth, associated "with the place of the new dwelling in the eternal life", with the coin representing a symbolic gift to the Earth. Coins of this type have also been found by archaeologists in the graves of the Albanians in the Middle Ages and in those of the Illyrians in antiquity.

==== Greek ====
In a religious context, Chthôn (Χθών) was conceived as the nether land of the underworld deities and the dead (Iliad 6,411; 8,14; Theogony 119; etc.), and often as the world itself as opposed to the sky.

Another reflex of Dʰéǵʰōm as the mother of mortals and their final resting place may also be found in Demetrioi ('of Demeter'), an Athenian designation for the dead, and in Aeschylus's verses in Choephori 127: "Yea, summon Earth, who brings all things to life, / And rears and takes again into her womb." In addition, Demeter was worshipped in some Greek cities in relation to her connection to the Underworld (cf. epithet Chthonia, 'of the earth, underworld'), besides her typical association with grains and crops. Demeter was also associated with the role of ward or mother of the dead: according to Plutarch's On the Face in the Moon's Orb, Demeter, who rules over the earth and all earthly things, separates the soul from the body after a human dies.

A similar imagery is described by poet Euripides, in his play The Suppliants, lines 530–536: "Let the dead now be buried in the earth, / and each element return to the place from where it came to the body, / (...) the body to the ground; / for in no way did we get it / for our own, but to live our life in, and after that its mother earth must take it back again". A funerary epigram of one Lycophron of Pherai, son of Philiskos, states his body, given by mother, now "occupies mother earth" (μητέρα γἥν).

==== Baltic ====
Moreover, historical sources on Baltic mythology, specially on Lithuanian and Latvian religions and practices, describe the dual role of goddesses Zemyna and Zemes Mate: while they were connected to the fertility of the land, they were also associated with receiving the dead and acting as their ruler and guardian. (Note: "Zemyna (otherwise Zemlja or Perkunatelé) is the earth-goddess and psychopomp of the dead.")

In Latvian dainas, Zemes Mate is associated with fellow Mahte ("Mothers") Velu Mate ('Mother of Dead Souls') and Kari Mate ('Mother of Graves'). According to researcher Elza Kokare, Zemes Mate and Kari Mate act as the resting places of the dead, guarding its body and holding the key to their graves. As an individual character, Zemes mate is invoked as a person's final resting place. (Note: Best exemplified by mythologist Lotte Motz: "The chthonic goddess zemes mate (Mother Earth) receives the dead within her realm. In dainas addressed to her, she provides the eternal resting place: "Rock me mother, hold me mother! / Short is the time spent at your breast. / Mother Earth will hold me longer, / beneath her turf, a welcome guest." (J1209)". She also stated that "In Latvian society ... Mother Earth - zemes mate - is chiefly the resting place of the departed, ...") (Note: "In the next quatrain folksong it concerns about death, the sleeping (slumbering) in the grave. The Mother Earth is the goddess, from whom are coming all living beings and to whom after death they go back: (25) Ar Dieviņu, mâmulïte, / Labvakar, zemes mate!/ Labvakar, zemes mate, / Vai büs laba dusesanal [Good bye, Mother, / Good evening, Mother Earth! / Good evening, Mother Earth, / Shall I slumber well?]".) (Note: "Ar Dieviņu, tēvs, māmiņa,/ Labvakaru, Zemes māte (x2)/ Glabā manu augumiņu". [Farewell, father and mother, / Good evening, Earth mother (x2) / Take my body in your keeping].) Pieces of Lithuanian folklore also make references to Earth as mother of humans and their final abode after death. (Note: "Archeological findings witness that the most ancient phase of Lithuanian culture was definitely Zemyna's culture. The distinguishing factor in these findings was the burial rites. In the oldest cultural phase, the dead were buried - given back to Zemyna, Mother Earth.") (Note: Researcher Nijole Laurinkiene, at the end of her book on Zemyna, writes thus: "Žemyna was also imagined as the giver and supporter of human life, because like flora and fauna, humanity is a part of nature. (...) The newborn would immediately be laid down on Mother Earth as if she were its biological mother, so that she could ‘accept’ and ‘embrace’ the infant as her own earthly creation and give it vegetative power and vitality on a cosmic plane. (...)".) (Note: "Žeme, motina mano, aš iš tavęs esu, tu mane šeri, tu mane nešioji, tu mane po smerčio pakavosi" [Earth, my mother, I am from you, you feed me, you support me, you embrace me after death].)

Funeral lamentations, such as some collected in Veliouna in the 19th and 20th centuries, attest the expression "sierą žemelę" as the destination of the deceased to whom the lament is dedicated. In a later military death lament, the "sierą žemelę" is said to drink the blood of the fallen soldier, after being shot. An issue of Lithuanian newspaper Draugas published a dainas wherein the person invokes the earth as "žeme, žeme, siera žemele", and asks it to take her, a maiden, having already taken father and mother ("Atėmei tėvą ir motinėlę"), but the earth scolds her.

==== Slavic ====
Old Slavic beliefs seem to attest some awareness of this ambivalent nature of the Earth: it was considered men's cradle and nurturer during one's lifetime, and, when the time of death came, it would open up to receive their bones, as if it were a "return to the womb". (Note: For instance: "the Russian peasant envisioned the underworld of the ancestors as a house heated against the dampness of Mother Moist Earth by a pech [pečʹ, 'stove']."; "Among the peasantry in Vladimir Province, as in other places, it was customary for the dying to ask earth permission to reenter her body with the ritual invocation: 'Mother Moist Earth, forgive me and take me'.") (Note: "The peasant child who died left its natal mother and went back to 'mother earth'. (...) That Russians did (and still do) personify the earth as a mother is well known. The peasant topos 'mother moist earth' ('mat' syra zemlia') refers to the mother specifically as a place one goes after dying, or in order to die (as opposed to a fertile place which gives birth to a harvest - for which there are other topoi). Ransel speaks of peasant beliefs about the earth pulling the child back to itself, inviting death. (...) To resist death too much is to resist 'mother moist earth'.") (Note: "According to a Polish legend, "God ordered the Earth: ‘You will give birth to people and you will devour them; whatever you give birth to, you will eat, as it is yours’" (Szyjewski 211, 130).".) (Note: "Mother Earth stands at the core of the Eastern Slavic religiosity. In her converge the most secret and profound religious feelings. With awe, the people venerate the black, moist depths - the womb which is the source of all fertilized powers, the nourishing breast of nature, the definitive resting place of all in death. Mother Earth is covered by a veil of grass, flowers, forests, trees, vegetables and grain. Thus both beauty and fertility are her choice virtues and powers. As a mother who nourishes living human beings, the earth is the embodiment of kindness and mercy; she also embraces them for rest after death.") (Note: "Symbolically, funeral rites provide the belief that the deceased will return to mother earth to live a new life in a new abode (the coffin and grave). According to Russian folk belief, the deceased no longer lives in its former home but continues a liminal existence in a new "dwelling-place," that is the coffin, which in some parts of Russia even had windows (Vostochnoslavianskaia 348). (...) In this context, the motif of life in the funeral lament is similar to the archetypal figure of the Moist Mother Earth (Mati syra zemlia) in its representation of rebirth. In these laments, the deceased is portrayed as being returned to the Moist Mother Earth, but before settling in her "permanent nest" it is carried into its new room—the coffin. С попом—отцом духовныим / Да с петьем божьим церковныим! / Как схороним тебя, белая лебедушка, / Во матушку сыру землю / И во буеву холодную могилушку, / В вековечну, бесконечну тебя жирушку, / Закроем тебя матушкой сырой землей, / Замуравим тебя травонькой шелковою! (Chistov 237) [With a priest, with a spiritual father / And with the swimming of God's Church / How will we bury you, little white swan / In the Damp Mother Earth / In the cold little grave / In the eternal, heavenly home / We will cover you with the Damp Mother Earth / We will cover you with silk grass]. (...) Funeral rituals, thus, reinforced the link between the living and the departed while allowing the deceased to rest permanently in its new domicile—the cosmic womb that is the Moist Mother Earth.") (Note: "East Slavic paganism was the product of a landlocked agricultural empire. Gods of sun, moon, stars, and wind did exist, but prayers were directed down to the life-giving black soil rather than up to celestial deities. Bodies did not "rise" after death but were reabsorbed into the womb of Mat'-syra-zemlya, Moist Mother Earth".)

In Polish curses, the malediction is aimed towards "the Holy Earth" (święta ziemia) not receiving the remains of the person cursed (as in, Bodaj cię święta ziemia nie przyjęła! and Oby cię święta ziemia nie przyjęła!). Researcher Anna Engelking cited that scholar Boris Uspensky wrote "a comprehensive analysis of the mythical trope of holy earth: the mother of humankind, which gives birth to people and accepts their bodies after death". Similarly, the imagery appears in "funeral hymns and speeches", e.g., Powracasz w ziemię, co twą matką była,/ Teraz cię strawi, niedawno żywiła ("You return to earth that has been your mother,/ She has fed you so far, now you’ll be devoured").

The imagery of the terre humide ("moist earth") also appears in funeral lamentations either as a geographical feature (as in Lithuanian and Ukrainian lamentations) or invoked as Mère-Terre humide ("Mother Moist Earth"). (Note: For example: "The maiden fair is dead (...) Split open, damp Mother Earth! / Fly asunder, ye coffin planks!"; "A young sergeant prayed to God, / Weeping the while, as a river flows,/ For the recent death of the Emperor, / The Emperor, Peter the First. / And thus amid his sobs he spake, - / 'Split asunder, O damp mother Earth / On all four sides - / Open, ye coffin planks (...)'"; "All on my father's grave / A star has fallen, has fallen from heaven ... / Split open, O dart of the thunder, The moist mother Earth!"; "I will take my dear children [and see], / Whether moist Mother Earth will not split open. / If moist Mother Earth splits open, / Straightway will I and my children bury ourselves in it (...) Split open, moist Mother Earth, / And be thou open, O new coffin-planks (...) (a widow's lament)"; "Arise, O ye wild winds, from all sides! Be ye borne, O winds, into the Church of God! Sweep open the moist earth! Strike, O wild winds, on the great bell! Will not its sounds and mine awaken words of kindness" (an orphan's lament).) (Note: The expression is also mentioned in a saying from Olonets: the master of the house invites his ghostly visitor to warm itself by the fire of the pech, since it must have been cold for him staying "in the moist earth".) (Note: In an adjuration by a Raskol, the supplicant invokes her to forgive them: "Forgive me, O Lord; forgive me, O holy Mother of God; (...) forgive, O damp-mother-earth; (...)".) (Note: In a funeral lament collected in the Olonets region by scholar Barsov, the mourner cries for a man struck by lightning sent by "thunderous" Saint Ilya, when said man was supposed to perform his Christian duties: "They lit candles of bright wax, / They prayed to God diligently, / They bowed low to moist mother earth / (...) The sinful soul departed without repentance/ (...)/ [His body] will not be committed to moist mother earth.") (Note: "Were you not afraid, had you no fear of entering mother-moist-earth? For it is cold there, and there is hunger there.".) The imagery and expression of "Mother Moist Earth" seem to have persisted well into the 21st century, although divorced from its sacral aspect. (Note: Professors Elizabeth Warner and Svetlana Adonyeva published in 2021 a book with the results of a joint research on funeral laments in modern Russian rural places. Their findings show that the laments still contained the poetical expression. For instance: "(...) Well, I know myself, little orphan girl, / Where you are going, all dressed up,/ You are on your way into mother-moist-earth..."; "(...) Break asunder, mother-moist-earth./ (...)/Stand up, my darling child. / Hear me, your grieving mother, (...)".)

In a Ukrainian lamentation, the mourner invokes earth as his "damp mother" ("Земле ж моя земле, мать сирая"), and asks it to take him, the mourner ("a young one"), since it has already taken father ("отця") and mother ("неньку", endearing or diminutive form of "не́ня").

In Belarusian folk songs, the earth is invoked as "syroj ziamli-matušcy" ('damp earth-mother'), and even referred to as the resting place of the mourner's loved one ("Žoŭcieńki piasok, syraja ziamlia, Tut pachavana milaja maja"; English: 'Yellow sand, damp earth: here my dear is buried'). In addition, phraseological studies by linguist Olga A. Lyashchynskaya (be) recognize the incidence of the expression in Belarusian: expression "спаць у сырой зямлі" ('to sleep in the damp earth') is a metaphor for death; expression "ляжаць у сырой зямлі/зямельцы" ("to lie in the damp earth/ground") denotes a burial ("to be interred"); "ажаніцца з <сырою> зямлёй" ("to marry the [moist] earth") means "to die".

Serbian idiomatic expressions also associate the earth with the grave, and the formula "dark earth" ("crna zemlja") appears in reference to the resting place of the dead.

Mat' Syra Zemlya is also invoked in wedding songs by the orphan bride for her parents to bless her journey to the new household.

==== Indo-Aryan ====
In Book 10 of the Rigveda, Hymn XVIII (a funeral hymn), verses 10-13, the earth is invoked to receive the body of the departed and to cover him gently, as a mother does a child: "10. Betake thee to the lap of Earth the Mother, of Earth far-spreading, very kind and gracious. (...) 11. Heave thyself, Earth, nor press thee downward heavily: afford him easy access, gently tending him. Cover him, as a mother wraps her skirt about her child, O Earth." A second hymn in Vedic sacred literature requests Earth to open up and explicitly receive the dead, while also mentioning the "two kings", Yama and Varuna: "Open thy arms, o Earth, receive the dead/ With gentle pressure and with loving welcome / Embrace him tenderly, e'en as a mother / Folds her soft vestment round the child she loves. / Soul of the dead, depart (...)".

In the Śatapatha Brāhmaṇa, written by Vedic sage Yajnavalkya, there is reference to a ritual of the placement of the bones of the deceased in the earth after cremation. According to the Kanda XIII,8,3,3, the text says that "May Savitri deposit thy bones in the mother's lap [māturupastha].' Savitri thus deposits his bones in the lap of the mother [māturupastha], this earth [pṛthivyai]; 'O Earth, be thou propitious unto him!'".

== Evidence ==
=== *Dʰéǵʰōm ===
Cognates stemming from *dʰéǵʰōm are attested in the following mythologies:

- PIE: *dʰ(é)ǵʰ-ōm (acc. dʰǵʰ-ém-m, gen. *dʰǵʰ-mós), the 'earth',
  - Anatolian: *déǵ-m,
    - Hittite: Tagān-zepa- ('Genius of the Earth; later dagān-zipa-), a chthonic deity also serving as a witness in treaties (composed of the stem dagan-, 'earth', attached to šipa, 'genius'),
  - Proto-Greek: *kʰtʰōn, 'earth' (the initial consonant cluster *dʰǵʰ- evolved into *kʰtʰ- via metathesis; the final -m turned into -n through regular sound laws),
    - Greek: Chthonie, attested in fragmentary passages of Pherecydes of Syros as a primordial goddess of earth who changed her name to Gaia after Zeus married her; she is depicted as Chthôn (Χθών), the partner of Ouranos in Aeschylus's Danaids; the same name is also used as an epithet of Poseidon by Homer; the epithets Chthonía (Χθωνία; 'belonging to the earth, the ground, the underworld'), associated with the grain goddess Demeter, and Chtónios (Χθόνιος; id.), attached to Zeus or Hermes as those who go to the underworld; another cognate appears in the name of the chthonic deities (χθόνιοι θεοί) of the underworld,
  - Old Avestan: Zām ('Earth'), a sanctified being in the Zoroastrian tradition that embodies the concept of Earth, (Note: Sometimes Zam is paired with other Zoroastrian deity, Armaiti, another being associated with the Earth, thus forming a compound Zam-Armaiti or Zam-Armatay.)
    - Young Avestan: Zamyād (a contraction of *zām huδād yazad), divinity of the Munificent Earth in the Zamyād Yašt.
  - Balto-Slavic: *źem- (from*dʰǵʰ-em-),
    - Baltic: *žeme,
      - Lithuanian: Žemyna (also Žemynėlė and Žemelė), a goddess celebrated as the bringer of flowers, and a recipient of prayers and sacrifices; expression sierà žěmė ('wet/humid earth'); (Note: The word sierà means the color 'gray' in Lithuanian, and scholarship suggests it is phonetically - not semantically - close to Russian syra 'wet, moist'. However, it is also acknowledged that the expression "gray earth" may still indicate the fertility of the land by referring to a combination of the elements of earth and water (humidity). Works that contain this expression have been collected from eastern and southern Lithuania. On the other hand, historian Rainer Eckert claimed the word sierà 'damp' is a borrowing from East Slavic syra.)
      - Latvian: Zemes Māte ('Mother Earth'), one of the goddesses of death in Latvian mythology,
    - Slavic: *zeml'à, (Note: A common epithet that accompanies 'earth' in Slavic languages is syra 'moist, damp'. Claire Le Feuvre suggests that the word is etymologically related to Old Icelandic saurr and Greek language 'eúroeis', used to describe the Underworld and the burial place of mortals, and all three words derive from a Proto-Indo-European poetical expression that means "damp earth".)
      - East Slavic:
        - Old Russian: Mat' Syra Zemlya ('Mother Moist Earth'), in the byliny (epic poems), and Matushka zeml'ja ('Little Mother Earth') in folk incantations to ensure a good harvest;
        - Ukrainian: Syraja zemlja and mati - syra zemlja; (Note: Invoked as the celebrant's mother: Syraja zemlja, - ty ž maty moja ("Moist Earth, you are my mother"). The original text is thus: "Сира земля — то ж мати моя. / То ж то мати моя мене прийняла".)
        - Belarusian: Maci syra zjamlja ("Маці сыра зямля"), and expression "The Sacred Earth, it is our mother" ("Зямля святая, яна наша маці");
      - West Slavic:
        - Polish: Mateczka Ziemia ("Little mother earth"); (Note: Professor Małgorzata Oleszkiewicz-Peralba stated that Polish and Russian languages refer to the earth and the rivers with this feminine epithet "little mother".) matka ziemia, ziemicka mamicka and do ziemi matusi.
      - South Slavic:
        - Bulgarian: Sura Zemya ('Moist Earth'), in folk songs, (Note: According to Russian scholarship, Bulgarian folkloric tradition uses the adjective "сура" (syra) "as a permanent epithet" of "земя" (earth).) and surova zemya ("Сурова земя");
        - Serbian: mother Earth ("маjка-земља"), in an idiomatic expression; (Note: The idiom is "drunken as mother Earth", speculated to be of Proto-Slavic origin and presumed to relate to Earth as a passive element, that receives the frutifying rains of Heaven.)
  - Proto-Albanian: *dzō,
    - Albanian: dhe ('earth'), appearing in Dhé, Zonja e Dheut "Earth Great Mother", "Earth Goddess" respectively, and ritualized in the cult of the earth and oath swearings (beja me dhe), also appears in euphemisms like Dhetokësi, Dheu or Përdhesi used to refer to the serpent as an earth-deity, and E Bukura e Dheut ('Beauty of the Earth'), a chthonic goddess.

Two parallel terms meaning 'human, earthling' are also attested as derivatives of the stem *dʰ(é)ǵʰ-:

- PIE: *dʰǵʰom-yo-, 'human, earthling',
  - Sanskrit: kṣámyaḥ, 'terrestrial',
  - Proto-Greek: *kʰtʰōnyos,
    - Greek: chtónios (χθόνιος), 'belonging to the earth',
  - Celtic: *gdonyo-, 'human, person',
    - Gaulish: -xtonio- (*gdonios), 'human', in the expression deuogdonioi, 'gods-and-men',
    - Old Irish: duine, 'human',
    - Middle Welsh: dyn, 'human',
- PIE: dʰǵʰ(e)-mōn (acc. *dʰǵʰ-m-on-m), 'human, earthling',
  - Italic: *χem-ō-, *χe/om-on-m,
    - Latin: homō, hominis, 'human, man',
    - Oscan: humuns, Umbrian: homonus, 'man',
  - Germanic: *guman-, 'man',
    - Gothic: guma, 'man',
    - Old Norse: gumi, 'man',
    - Old English: guma, Old Saxon: gumo, Old High German: gomo, 'man',
  - Baltic:
    - Old Lithuanian: žmuō, 'man'; Lith.: žmónės, 'people', žmonà, 'wife, woman',
    - Old Prussian: smoy, 'man', smūni, 'person',

Additionally, remnants of the noun *dʰéǵʰōm can be found in formulaic phrases and religious epithets: (Note: As an aside, Serbian philogist Aleksandar Loma once suggested that the Slavic name for the Verbascum, divizna (cs), is a dvandva compound of "*div" 'sky' and "*zma" (> zna) 'earth', harking back to the sacred mythological Sky-Earth pair.)

- Vedic: the compound Dyāvākṣamā, ('heaven and earth'), with kṣamā associated with the earth goddess Prithvi (the 'Broad One').
- Greek: the epithets χαμύνη (khamyne (de), 'of the land'), in reference to Deméter (Note: Another possibility is that Khamyne was herself, in fact, a separate deity who was syncrethized with Demeter in later times. Her temple was discovered in 2006, 150 metres away from the main stadium.) (in Pausanias 6.21.1), and Χαμοναῖα (khamynaia, 'on the ground'). A designation Χαμοναῖος (khamonaïos, 'of the ground'; 'of the earth') in reference to Zeus, is also attested. These epithets are considered cognates to χαμαί (khamaí, 'pertaining, belonging to the earth').

==== Possible reflexes ====
Other mythologies may show the presence of characters and expressions that are etymologically cognate to *Dheghom. However, these cognates are less secured:

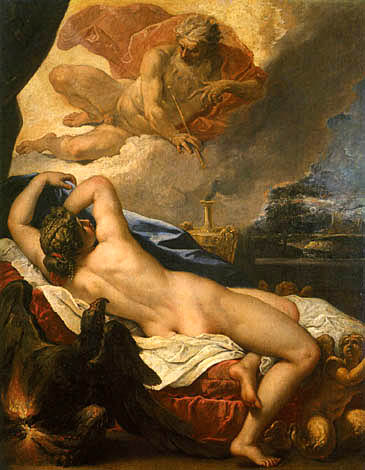
Jove and Semele (1695) by Sebastiano Ricci.

- Anatolian:
  - Lydian: references to a cult of Men Tiamou ('of Tiamos') led scholars to believe Tiamou is an epithet that means 'of the Earth' or 'of the Netherworld', possibly connected to Luwian tiyamm(i) 'earth'. This expression would be equivalent to a common epithet of Men: καταχθονιος ('of the Underworld'; 'subterranean').
- Hellenic:
  - Doric: linguist Krzysztof Witczak suggests the dialectal Doric word "δηγῆ" dēgê, in the expression "δηγῆ και σιωπᾷ" ("earth and keeps silence"), is a possibly ancient loanword from Proto-Albanian.
  - Greek: Damia, one of the Horae, a minor deity related to spring, growth and vegetation, and usually paired with fellow Horae Auxesia. Ancient literature suggests it might have been another name for Demeter.
- Iranian:
  - Khotanese: evidence suggests that the Khotanese preserved some relics of an Indo-Iranian worship of the earth, as seen in the Saka roots ysam- and ysama-, both meaning 'earth' and cognate to Avestan zam-. The word is also attested in the personal name Ysamotika, and in the religious expression ysamaśśandaā, meaning 'world'.
- Tocharian: the expression tkamñkät (Tocharian A) and keṃ-ñäkte (Tocharian B) are used in religious Buddhist texts written in the Tocharian languages, where it denotes the earth or an 'earth-god' of some sort.
- Italic:
  - Hunte, an Umbrian deity, possibly stemming from *ǵʰom-to- 'who is below'.
  - Semonia, obscure deity associated with crops and sowing, of possible Roman or Sabine origin and worship, usually attested with the epithet Salus Semonia. A possible male counterpart is Semo Sancus, god of Sabine provenance whose traits merged with Dius Fidius's. Semonia and Sancus appear with other agricultural/crop deities Seia and Segetia.
- Celtic:
  - Old Irish: goddess Dana, taken by some Indo-Europeanist scholars to be an Irish earth goddess.
  - Welsh mythology: linguist John T. Koch interprets the family known as Children of Dôn (Plant Dôn) as "Children of the Earth", since the name of their matriach, Dôn, would derive from Celtic *gʰdʰonos ('the earth', gen.).
- Baltic:
  - Lithuanian: Žemėpatis ('Earth Spouse') and Žemininkas, male deities associated with cattle, agriculture and the fertility of the land. Their names are present in historical records of the Lithuanian non-Christian faith by foreign missionaries. A male divinity with the name Zemeluks, Zamoluksei, Zameluks or Ziameluks is also said to be attested. An account tells he is a DEUS TERRAE ('earth god'), while in other he is "a lord or god of earth who was buried in the earth" by the Prussians.
- Unclassified Indo-European languages:
  - Phrygian: the epithet ΓΔΑΝ ΜΑ (Gdan Ma), taken to mean 'Earth Mother', or a loan from Anatolian languages. However, the name appears as a compound in names of Asia Minor written in the Greek alphabet. Phrygian also attests the word KTON as referring to the earth.
  - Thracian: Zemelā (possibly from *gʰem-elā); with a cognate in the Greek goddess Semele, (Note: Etymological connections of "Thraco-Phrygian" Semele with Žemele and Žemyna have been noted. Thus, according to Borissoff, "she could be an important link bridging the ancient Thracian and Slavonic cults (...)".) (Note: Ivan Duridanov pointed out that the Phrygian word zemelō also meant "Mother Earth".) and the obscure Dionysian epithet Semeleios (Semeleius or Semelēus), meaning 'He of the Earth', 'son of Semele'. (Note: The epithet also appears associated with minor deity Iacchus, as in the expression Semeleios Iakchus plutodotas ("Son of Semele, Iakchus, wealth-giver").)
  - Messapic: Damatura, from dā- (possibly from *dʰǵʰ(e)m-) attached to matura ('mother'); maybe at the origin of the Greek goddess Demeter.

=== *Pl̥th₂éwih₂ ===
Cognates stemming from the epithet *Pl̥th₂éwih₂ (the 'Broad One') are attested in the following traditions:

- Old Hittite: palḫiš dankuiš daganzipaš, 'broad dark earth-genius',
- Indo-Iranian: *pṛtH-uiH-,
  - Vedic: Pṛithvī Mātā (पृथ्वी) ('Mother Earth, the Vast One'), the most frequent Vedic word for both the earth and the Earth-goddess; and the poetic formula kṣā́m ... pṛthivī́m ('broad earth'), cf. also Prithu (Sanskrit: पृथु, Pṛthu), a mythological sovereign who chases the goddess Prthvi, shapeshifted as a cow; his name means 'far, wide, broad'.
  - Young Avestan: ząm pərəθβīm, 'broad earth',
- Greek: Plátaia (Πλάταια), a naiad described as consort of Zeus and the daughter of the river Asopos; also the name given to the city of Plataea in Beotia,
- Celtic: Litavī, probably an earth-goddess; also the divine name given to the peninsula of Brittany in medieval Celtic languages,

The word also survived in common terms for 'land, field':

- Germanic: *fuldō, 'earth, ground, field, the world',
  - Old Norse: fold; Old English: folde, same meaning. (Note: Another Germanic reflex of "fold" is present in compound Feldgeister ('spirits of the fields'), creatures of Germanic folklore.)
- Proto-Slavic: *pȍļe, 'field',
  - Slavic mythology: Polevoi or Polevik, male deity of the fields; Polianitsa, name of a female bogatyr related to *pȍļe; Byely Polianin ('White Field-Dweller'), a folktale character;
  - Old Church Slavonic: polje, 'field'.

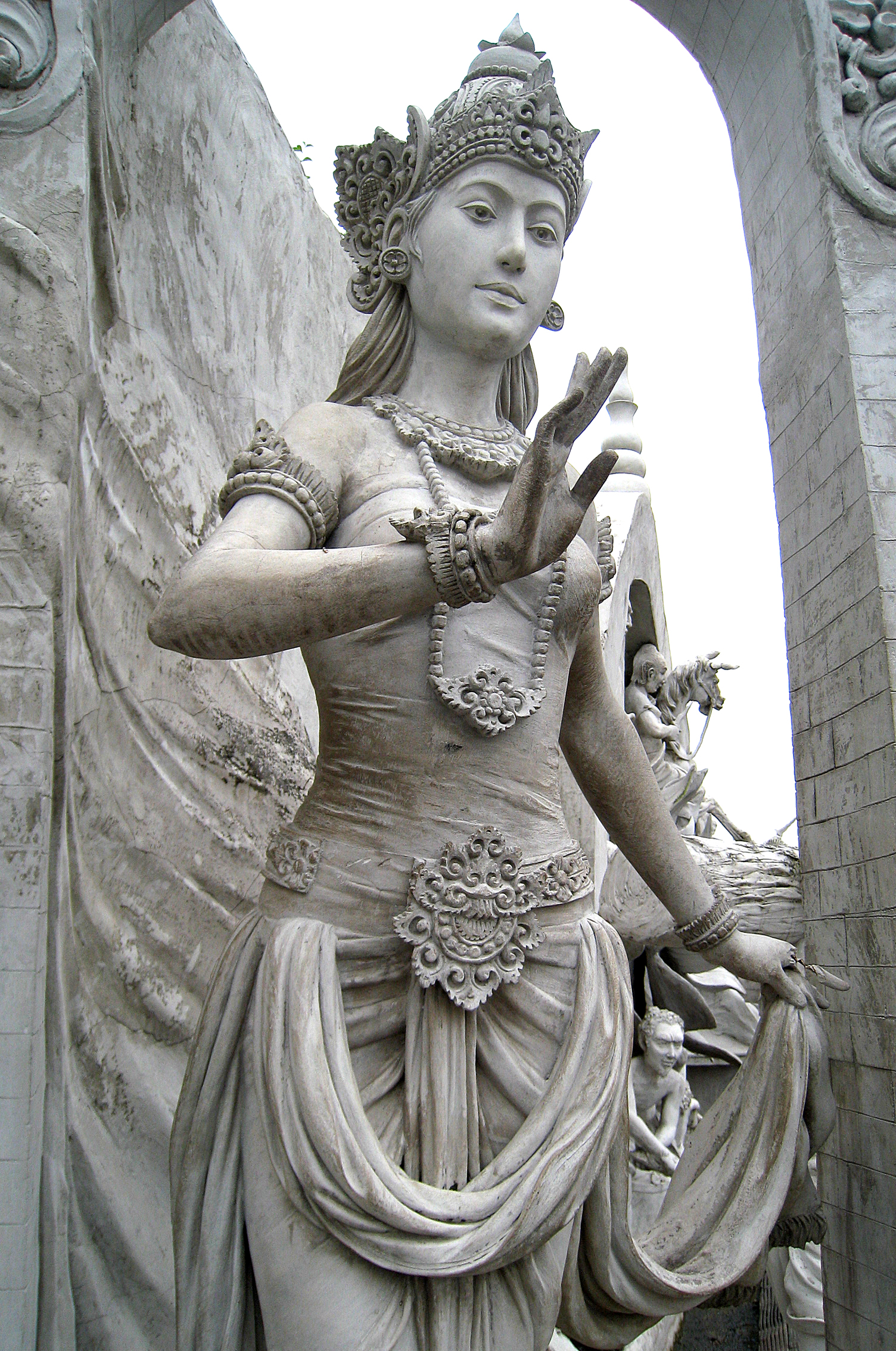
Statue of Ibu Pertiwi, whose name, though in a non-Indo-European language, is a descendant of the root *Pl̥th₂éwih₂

In non-Indo-European traditions, a notable descendant of *Pl̥th₂éwih₂ occurs as Ibu Pertiwi; her name borrowed from Vedic Pṛithvī, she is a national personification of Indonesia.

Other cognates are less secured:

- Baltic:
  - Latvian: expression plata māte ('wide mother'), present in Latvian riddles about natural features and whose answer is "žeme" ('earth').
- Italic:
  - Venetic: pletuvei, attested in a funerary monument; and Pultovia.
  - Vestinian: Peltuinum.
  - Umbrian: Pletinas, an epithet assigned to Italic goddess Cupra.
- Celtic:
  - Celtiberian: letontu; Letondonis (attested as a personal name); leitasama (superlative form of adjective, attested on a coin).
  - Gallaecian: Bletisam(a) (modern Ledesma, Salamanca), attested in a rock carving inscribed in a tombstone.
  - Hispano-Celtic: the toponym Ledaña (es) (in Cuenca, Spain), thought to derive from *(p)litanya.
  - Gaulish: Litana, toponym describing "a vast forest" located in North Italy, which, according to historiographer Titus Livius, "was named Litania by the Gauls"; the site of the historical Battle of Silva Litana.
  - Gallo-Roman: Litanobriga, a Celtic settlement of unknown location.

== Parallels ==
Although not considered a cognate to either Dʰéǵʰōm or Pl̥th₂éwih₂, deity Spenta Armaiti, of Zoroastrism religion, is associated with the earth, with fertility and farmers (Note: She is "the Old Iranian goddess of cultivated land, vegetation and fertility, having a link with the rite of inhumation" and to whom "the material earth belongs".) (Note: "In the realm of the material world, Spenta Armaiti is the guardian spirit of the earth (Vendidad 3.35), the symbol of bountifulness ... as well as the protector of herdsmen and farmers. Frequently, however, she is spoken of as the earth itself rather than as the genius of the earth (Yasna 16.10; Yasht 24.50; Vendidad 2.10, 2.14, 2.18, 18.51, 18.64). ... in the physical realm she represents, and later becomes, the earth.") as well as the dead.

A counterpart exists in pre-Christian Armenian mythology, named Spandaramet or Sandaramet, whose role is connected to earth and the underworld. Namely, she was the "Armenian earth-goddess" of vineyards, but also ruled over "'those that are asleep', i.e. the dead". She is considered to have been developed from her Zoroastrian counterpart, Spenta Armaiti, a female being in that tradition. Spandaremet was transformed into a male god of the Underworld in later Armenian tradition, and, under Christian influence, lent her name to an underworld realm where evil spirits are said to dwell.

Both deities are seen, in their respective religions, as the wife or companion of a sky-god, Ahura Mazda (Note: In Ahura Mazda's case, he is described as creator (or father) of Armaiti.) or Aramazd. He, in turn, is said to be the deity of rains in some accounts.

== See also ==
- Earth goddess

== Bibliography ==
- Beekes, Robert S. P. (2009). Etymological Dictionary of Greek. Brill. ISBN 978-90-04-32186-1.
- Boyce, Mary (1996). A History of Zoroastrianism, The Early Period. Brill. ISBN 978-90-04-29400-4.
- Çabej, Eqrem (1975). Studime gjuhësore: Gjuhë. Folklor. Letërsi. Diskutime (in Albanian). Vol. 5. Rilindja.
- Calin, Didier (2017). Dictionary of Indo-European Poetic and Religious Themes. Paris: Les Cent Chemins. ISBN 978-1976106347.
- Coulter, Charles R.; Turner, Patricia (2013). Encyclopedia of Ancient Deities. Routledge. ISBN 978-1-135-96390-3.
- Delamarre, Xavier (1984). Le Vocabulaire indo-européen: lexique étymologique thématique (in French). Libraire D'Amérique et d'Orient. ISBN 978-2-7200-1028-6.
- Delamarre, Xavier (2003). Dictionnaire de la langue gauloise: Une approche linguistique du vieux-celtique continental (in French). Errance. ISBN 978-2877723695.
- Derksen, Rick (2007). Etymological Dictionary of the Slavic Inherited Lexicon. Brill. ISBN 9789004155046.
- Derksen, Rick (2015). Etymological Dictionary of the Baltic Inherited Lexicon. Brill. ISBN 9789004155046.
- Elsie, Robert (2001). A Dictionary of Albanian Religion, Mythology and Folk Culture. London: Hurst & Company. ISBN 1-85065-570-7.
- Fortson, Benjamin W. (2004). Indo-European Language and Culture. Blackwell Publishing. ISBN 1-4051-0316-7.
- García Ramón, José L. (2017). Reconstructing Indo-European phraseology: Continuity and renewal (PDF). The Split: Reconstructing Early Indo-European Language and Culture. University of Copenhagen.
- Jackson, Peter (2002). "Light from Distant Asterisks. Towards a Description of the Indo-European Religious Heritage". Numen. 49 (1): 61–102. doi:10.1163/15685270252772777. ISSN 0029-5973. JSTOR 3270472.
- Kloekhorst, Alwin (2008). Etymological Dictionary of the Hittite Inherited Lexicon. Brill. ISBN 9789004160927.
- Kroonen, Guus (2013). Etymological Dictionary of Proto-Germanic. Brill. ISBN 9789004183407.
- Mallory, James P.; Adams, Douglas Q. (1997), Encyclopedia of Indo-European Culture, London: Routledge, ISBN 978-1-884964-98-5
- Mallory, James P.; Adams, Douglas Q. (2006), The Oxford Introduction to Proto-Indo-European and the Proto-Indo-European World, Oxford, England: Oxford University Press, ISBN 978-0-19-929668-2
- Mann, Stuart E. (1948). An Historical Albanian-English Dictionary. Vol. II, N–Z. Longmans, Green and Co., LTD.
- Matasović, Ranko (2009). Etymological Dictionary of Proto-Celtic. Brill. ISBN 978-90-04-17336-1.
- Orel, Vladimir (1998). Albanian etymological dictionary. Brill. ISBN 978-90-04-11024-3.
- Pipa, Arshi (1993). "The Mythology of Albania". In Bonnefoy, Yves (ed.). American, African, and Old European mythologies. University of Chicago Press. ISBN 0-226-06457-3.
- Poghirc, Cicerone (1987). "Albanian Religion". In Mircea Eliade (ed.). The Encyclopedia of Religion. Vol. 1. New York: MacMillan Publishing Co. pp. 178–180.
- Puhvel, Jaan (2004). "Darkness in Hittite". Historische Sprachforschung. 117 (2): 194–196. ISSN 0935-3518. JSTOR 40849222.
- Sansalvador, Ana Vegas (1992). "Χαμύνη, ein Beiname der Demeter in Olympia" (PDF). Glotta. 70 (3/4): 166–180. ISSN 0017-1298. JSTOR 40266930.
- Tirta, Mark (2004). Petrit Bezhani (ed.). Mitologjia ndër shqiptarë (in Albanian). Tirana: Mësonjëtorja. ISBN 99927-938-9-9.
- de Vaan, Michiel (2008). Etymological Dictionary of Latin (and the other Italic Languages). Brill Academic Publishers. ISBN 978-90-04-16797-1.
- Ushaku, Ruzhdi (1988). "Mbi strukturën leksiko-semantike dhe etimologjike të tipit të togfjalëshit të shqipes burri i dheut (Mundësia për një rindërtim)". Gjurmime Albanologjike. 17–18. Albanological Institute of Prishtina: 63–76.
- West, Martin Litchfield (2007), Indo-European Poetry and Myth, Oxford, England: Oxford University Press, ISBN 978-0-19-928075-9
- Wodtko, Dagmar S.; Irslinger, Britta Sofie; Schneider, Carolin (2008). Nomina im Indogermanischen Lexikon (in German). Universitaetsverlag Winter. ISBN 978-3-8253-5359-9.
- York, Michael (1993). "Toward a Proto-Indo-European vocabulary of the sacred". WORD. 44 (2): 235–254. doi:10.1080/00437956.1993.11435902. ISSN 0043-7956.
