= Spandarmad =

Spandarmad may be:

- the Middle Persian form of Spenta Armaiti, one of the Amesha Spenta or "Bounteous Immortals"
- a month of the historical Zoroastrian calendar, see Zoroastrian month names
- the Sepandārmazgān festival in Modern Iran
