= Prithvi =

Vedic goddess of the Earth

- Personification of the Earth
- Member of Thirty-three gods
- Devanagari: पृथ्वी
- Affiliation: Devi, Pancha Bhoota, Bhudevi
- Planet: Earth
- Symbol: Cow
- Texts: Rig Veda, Atharva Veda (Prithvi Suktam), Brahmanas

Genealogy
- Consort: Dyaus
- Children: Ushas and other Rigvedic deities

Equivalents
- Greek: Gaia
- Indo-European: Dʰéǵʰōm
- Norse: Jörð
- Roman: Tellus Mater

Prithvi (Sanskrit: पृथ्वी, Pṛthvī, also पृथिवी, Pṛthivī, "the Vast One", also rendered Pṛthvī Mātā), is the Sanskrit name for the Earth, as well as the name of the goddess-personification of it in Hinduism. The goddess Prithvi is an archetypal Mother Goddess, and one of the most important goddesses in the historical Vedic religion.

She is depicted as a stable, fertile, and benevolent presence in the Vedas. She is frequently addressed as a mother, and a nurturing, generous goddess who provides sustenance to all beings living on her vast, firm expanse. While the Rigveda predominantly associates her with Dyaus ('Father Sky'), the Atharvaveda and later texts portray her as an independent deity.

In classical Hinduism, the figure of Prithvi is supplanted by the goddess Bhumi, while the term Prithvi serves as one of her epithets. She becomes significantly associated with Vishnu, one of the most important gods in later Hinduism, and two of his dashavatars—Varaha and Prithu.

Besides Hinduism, Prithvi holds a significant position in Buddhism, symbolising the vastness and support that the Earth provides to all life. Her appearance in the Buddhist tradition is tied to the very moment of Buddha’s enlightenment, and she is considered the first goddess in the Buddhist pantheon.

== Etymology and epithets ==
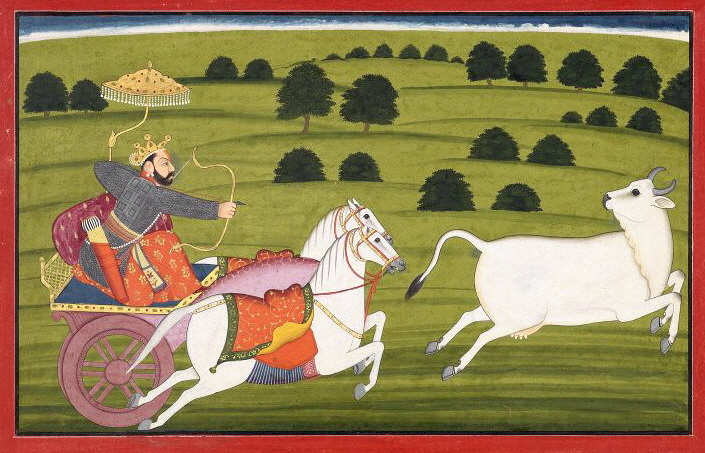
A Bhagavata Purana illustration by Manaku, c. 18th century. While the Earth goddess is referred to as Bhudevi in later post-Vedic scriptures, the term Prithvi remains as a prominent epithet. According to Puranas, the Earth got the epithet after being tamed in the form of a cow by the king Prithu, an incarnation of god Vishnu.

Prithvi is the most frequent Vedic word for both the earth and the Earth-goddess; and the poetic formula kṣā́m ... pṛthivī́m ('broad earth'). The name Pṛthivī (Sanskrit: पृथि्वी) has its roots in Proto-Indo-European mythology, originating from the epithet Plt̥h₂éwih₂, which means "the Broad One." This term highlights the expansive and nurturing nature of the Earth and forms the basis for the Vedic concept of Pṛthivī Mātā, or "Mother Earth."

Another connection is found between Prithvi and the mythological figure Prithu (Sanskrit: पृथु, Pṛthu), who chases the goddess Prthvi, shapeshifted as a cow. His name means 'far, wide, broad' and in later texts, the term Prithvi is treated as patronym for Earth derived from his name.

Goddess Prithvi is referred to by various epithets across different religious traditions, particularly in the Vedic and Buddhist contexts. These epithets highlight her nurturing, sustaining, and protective qualities, as well as her connection to truth, fertility, and abundance. Some of the key epithets used for Prithvi are listed below:

- Bhūmi – 'Soil'. This Vedic epithet becomes her primary name in later Hinduism
- Viśvagarbhā – 'Womb of the world'
- Medinī – 'Fertile one'
- Janitrī – 'Birthplace'
- Viśvasaṃ – 'Source of everything'
- Viśvaṃśu – 'Producer of everything'
- Dhātrī – 'Nursing mother'
- Dhāritrī – 'Nurturer'
- Viśvadhāyā – 'All-nourishing'
- Pṛśnī – 'Mother of plants'
- Vanaspatinām gṛbhir oṣadhīnāṃ – 'Womb of forest trees and herbs'
- Sthāvarā – 'Stable one'
- Dṛḍhā – 'Steady one'
- Kṣamā – 'Patient one'
- Dharā – 'Upholder'
- Viśvambharā – 'All-bearing'
- Viśvadhārinī – 'All-supporting'
- Ratnagarbhā – 'Repository of gems'
- Ratnavatī – 'Abounding in jewels'
- Vasundharā – 'Bearer of treasure'

== In Vedic scriptures ==
Three aspects of the term Prithvi appear in the Vedic scriptures: she is the physical earth, the universal mother of creation, and manifest matter that is formed during the cosmogonic process.

=== Rigveda ===
In the Rigveda, the goddess Prithvi is predominantly associated with the Earth, representing the terrestrial realm where human existence unfolds. However, Prithvi is rarely depicted in isolation. She is most often paired with Dyaus, the male deity representing the sky. This coupling of Prithvi and Dyaus forms the dual entity Dyavaprithivi, symbolizing the interconnectedness of the sky and earth. Their unity is so fundamental in the Rigveda that Prithvi is seldom addressed separately, with the two being described as kissing the central point of the world (Rigveda 1.185.5). Their mutual relationship is one of sanctity, as both deities complement each other (4.56.6). Together, they are considered the universal parents, responsible for the creation of the world (1.159) and the gods (1.185).

In this divine partnership, Dyaus is frequently referred to as the father, while Prithvi is recognized as the mother. It is suggested in certain hymns that the two were once inseparable, but later parted by Varuna's decree (6.70). Nonetheless, their connection remains strong, with Dyaus fertilising the earth (Prithvi) through rain, although in some instances, they are both credited with providing this nourishment (4.56). While Prithvi is largely associated with the Earth, it is sometimes unclear whether she has a connection to the sky as well. Dyaus and Prithvi are mentioned as the parents of various deities, especially Ushas, though the listing is not consistent throughout the text.

Beyond her maternal and productive attributes, Prithvi (often alongside Dyaus) is revered for her steadfast support. She is described as firm, upholding all that exists (1.185), encompassing everything (6.70), and as broad and vast (1.185). While she is generally characterized as immovable (1.185), other verses describe her as capable of free movement (5.84). Prithvi and Dyaus are also frequently invoked for wealth, prosperity, and strength (6.70). The rains they produce are praised for their richness, fullness, and fertility (1.22), and they are often called upon for protection from harm, forgiveness of sins (1.185), and to bring joy (10.63). Together, Prithvi and Dyaus represent a vast, stable domain of abundance and safety, a realm governed by the cosmic order (ṛta), which they nurture and sustain (1.159). They are seen as inexhaustible and full of potential life (6.70).

In a funeral hymn, Prithvi is portrayed as a compassionate and gentle mother, as the deceased is asked to return to her lap. She is implored to cover the dead lightly, as a mother would tenderly cover her child with her garment (10.18.10-12).

=== Atharva Veda ===
Prithvi is celebrated extensively in the Atharva Veda, where she is revered as the queen of all creation. She is referred to as the first water in the ocean, tying her to the primordial elements of existence. This description reinforces her fundamental role in the creation of life and the universe, linking her to fertility, abundance, and sustenance. The Atharva Veda highlights Prithvi as a fragrant, life-giving force, but also acknowledges that inherent dangers such as death and disease accompany this creative power. This dual nature emphasizes that while the Earth supports life, it can also bring destruction and hardship, representing the balance between creation and dissolution in the natural world. To avoid or mitigate these dangers, various rituals such as prayers, sacrifices, and the wearing of amulets were performed. This indicates the recognition of Prithvi's immense power and the need to maintain harmony with her through devotion and ritualistic appeasement.

One hymn in the Atharva Veda claims that Prithvi was germinated from the goddess Aditi, who represents boundlessness or infinity. Aditi is often regarded as the mother of the gods in the Rig Veda, which further highlights Prithvi’s role as a life-giving force. This connection aligns Prithvi with the cosmic order and fertility, positioning her within a larger framework of divine motherhood in Vedic thought. Similar to earlier Vedic texts, the Atharva Veda often presents Prithvi in partnership with Dyaus, the sky god. This pairing symbolizes the unity of heaven and earth, with Dyaus fertilizing Prithvi through rain, allowing life to sprout. Together, they form the universal parents who not only create life on earth but are also responsible for the birth of the gods.

Like in the Rig Veda, Prithvi is associated with the cow, called Gauri, which is revered for its milk-giving qualities. The cow is seen as a symbol of nourishment and motherhood, making this connection with Prithvi natural. The earth itself is compared to a cow, with its calves represented by different deities (e.g., Agni and Vayu), symbolizing the interconnectedness of nature and divinity.

==== Pṛthvī Sūkta ====
The most extensive praise of Prithvi in Vedic literature is found in the Prithvi Sukta (Atharvaveda 12.1). Unlike her depictions in the Rigveda, where she is almost always paired with Dyaus, the Prithvi Sukta is dedicated solely to her. In this hymn, Prithvi is seen as an independent and powerful goddess. Her consort is the mighty god Indra, who is said to protect her from harm. Other gods such as Vishnu, Parjanya, Prajapati, and Vishvakarma also play significant roles in relation to her. Vishnu is said to stride across her vast expanse, while Agni permeates her being.

Despite her close associations with various male deities, the hymn emphasizes Prithvi’s inherent greatness and fertility. She is hailed as the source of all plant life, particularly crops, and as the nourisher of all living creatures. Prithvi is described as patient and resilient, providing sustenance to both the virtuous and the wicked, gods and demons alike. Her nurturing role is further highlighted as she is repeatedly addressed as the mother of all and is asked to offer her nourishment, much like a mother feeding her child. She is likened to a nurse to all living beings, with her breasts full of life-giving nectar.

In the hymn, Prithvi’s life-sustaining energy extends beyond the physical realm. She is said to manifest in the scent of both men and women, embody the fortune and brilliance in men, and represent the vibrant energy of maidens. The hymn also asks for Prithvi’s blessings to ensure long life, invoking her nurturing qualities as central to both life and prosperity.

=== Yajurveda ===
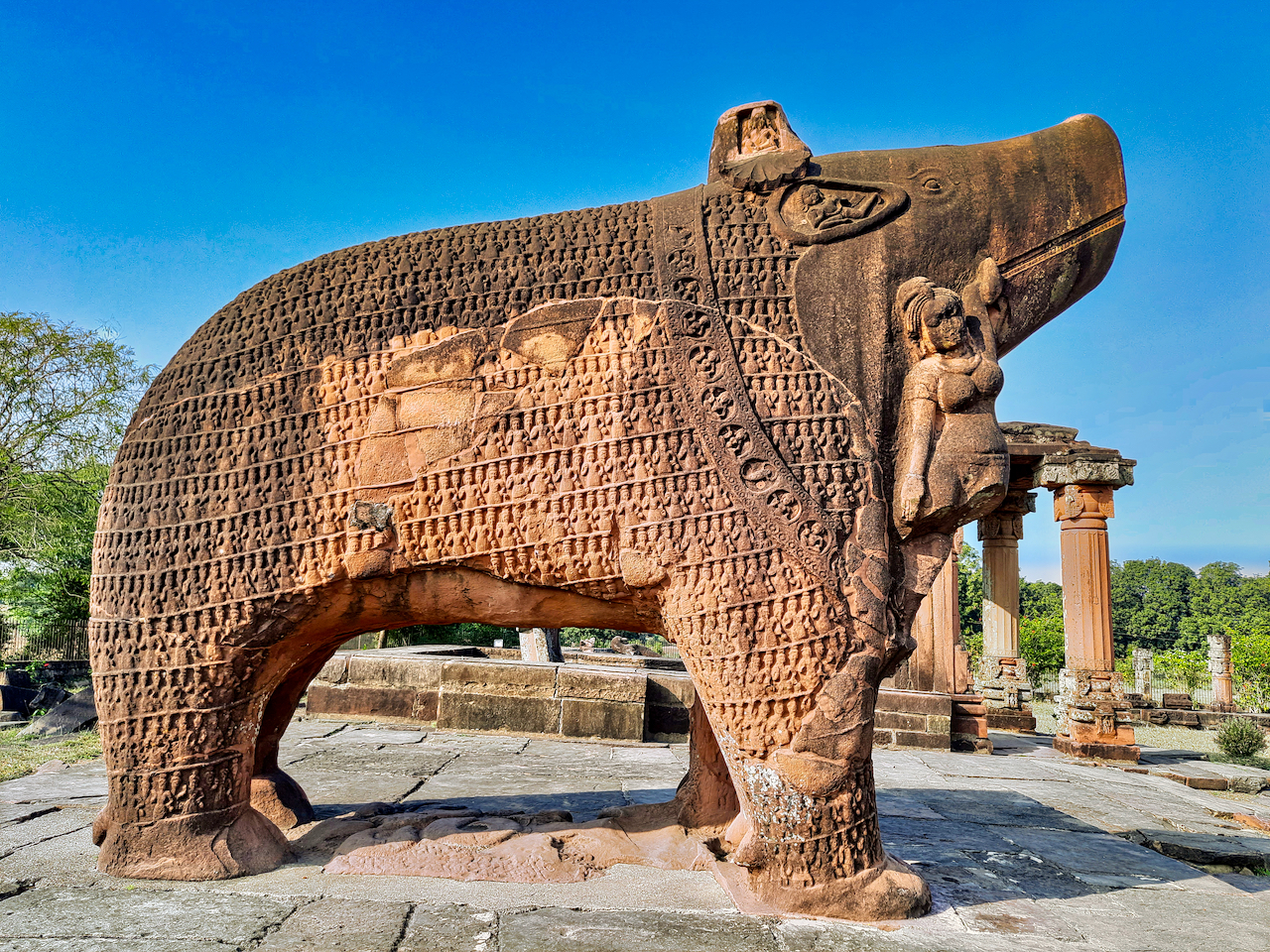
The Yajurveda introduces the earliest form of Varaha myth, where a boar lifts the Earth from primordial waters. The 6th-century Colossal Varaha at Eran is one of the earliest fully animalistic icons, with Bhumi clinging to its tusk.

Prithvi’s role extends to cosmogonic myths, especially in the Yajuraveda, where she plays a significant part in the creation process. In the Yajurveda, the earth is submerged in the cosmic ocean at the beginning of creation until a boar dives into the waters and brings it to the surface, enabling creation to unfold.

The Taittiriya Samhita expands the above Yajuraveda myth and describes the earth as being created from the waters, with the hymn Atharvaveda 12.1.8 stating that Prithvi was originally water (salila). This cosmogonic role positions the earth as the first material entity formed from the more abstract waters, marking an essential stage in creation.

This myth is seed of the later epic myth of Vishnu’s Varaha (boar) avatara, where the earth (Prithvi, now called Bhumi) is rescued from the depths of the ocean. This myth became a prominent part of later Hindu iconography, where Vishnu, in his boar form, lifts Bhumi out of the cosmic waters. This narrative emphasizes Prithvi's vulnerability in later myths and her need for divine protection, further reflecting the dynamic between the earth and the gods.

=== Brahmanas ===
In the Śatapatha Brāhmaṇa, Prithvi’s creation is further elaborated. Prajapati, the creator deity, compresses the shell of the primordial egg and throws it into the waters, leading to the formation of the earth from materials such as clay, mud, sand, and rocks. The earth is then spread out and becomes the foundation of the world, highlighting Prithvi’s role as the material basis of the universe.

Similar to Rigveda, the Śatapatha Brāhmaṇa also contains reference to a ritual of the placement of the bones of the deceased in the earth after cremation. According to the Kanda XIII,8,3,3, the text says that "May Savitri deposit thy bones in the mother's lap [māturupastha].' Savitri thus deposits his bones in the lap of the mother [māturupastha], this earth [pṛthivyai]; 'O Earth, be thou propitious unto him!'".

Prithvi’s relationship with other cosmic forces is also evident in the Brahmanas, where she is identified with Aditi, the mother of the gods. In the Brahmanas, Aditi and Prithvi are often conflated, with both representing the physical manifestation of the cosmos. Aditi retains her identity as the cosmic mother, while Prithvi symbolizes the Earth, the tangible, nurturing ground on which all creatures live. In later Brahmanas, Prithvi is less abstract than the waters but is similarly viewed as a manifestation of the material matrix of creation. She is no longer paired with Dyaus but with Prajapati, who becomes her mate in the cosmogonic process. This change reflects a shift in her identity from the earlier Vedic depictions, where she was closely associated with Dyaus as part of a divine pair, to her later role as the earth goddess who embodies the physical universe.

== In Post-Vedic scriptures ==
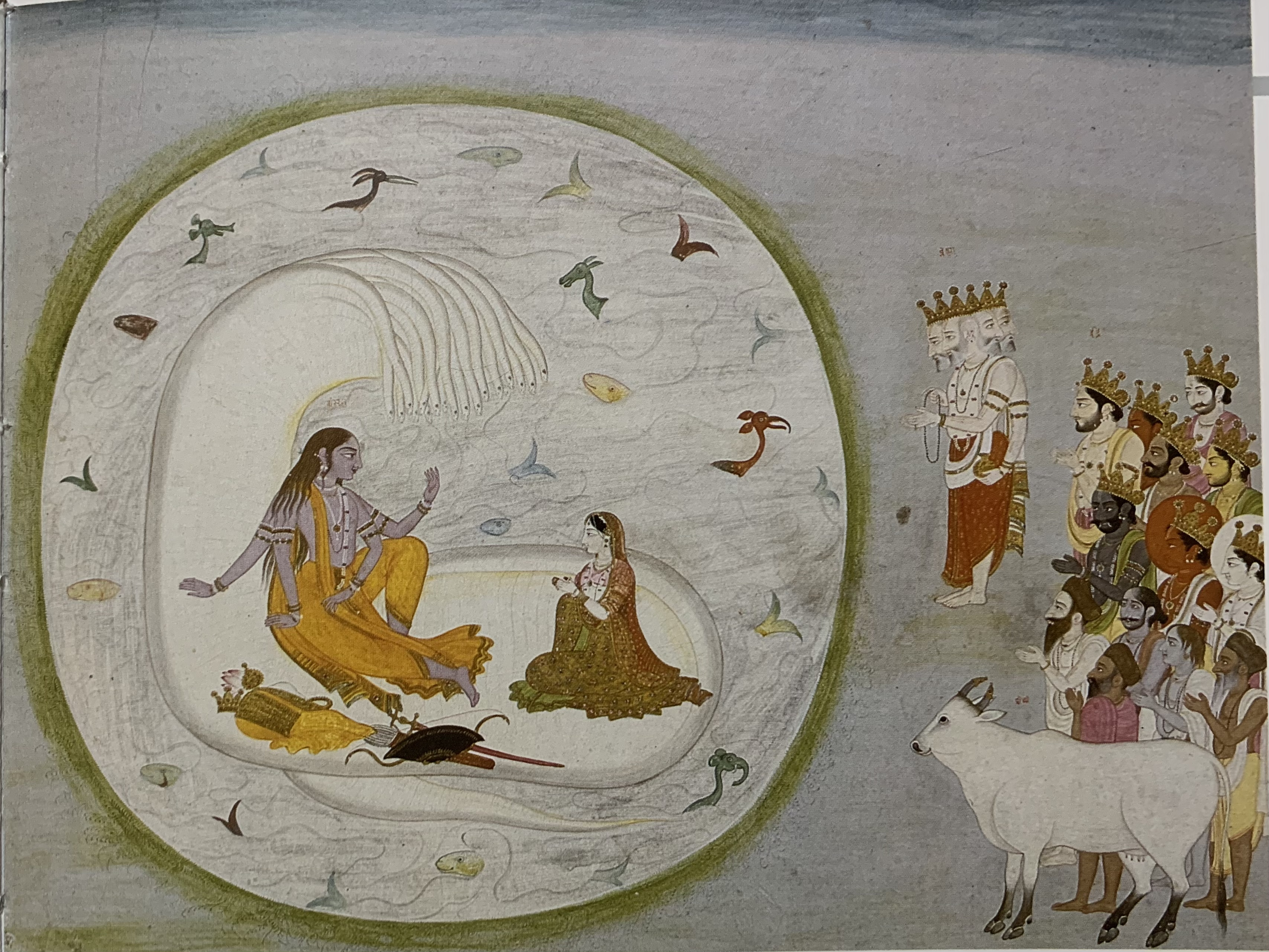
An illustration from the Bhagavata Purana depicting the Earth goddess in the form of a cow, along with other gods, appealing to Vishnu (seated on a serpent with his consort, Lakshmi) to alleviate her distress by destroying the evil on Earth.

In post-Vedic Hindu mythology, the earth goddess Prithvi retains a significant presence, though her role undergoes transformation. In the Vedic period, Prithvi was revered as both the literal earth and a divine being embodying stability, fertility, and the nourishing foundation of all life. As Hindu traditions evolved, Prithvi came to be more commonly known as Bhumi or Bhudevi, meaning "the goddess who is the earth." Bhudevi plays a central role in Vaishnavite mythology, where she is often portrayed as a supplicant, oppressed by evil forces, demons, or corrupt rulers. These stories frequently depict her appealing to Vishnu for assistance, and in response, Vishnu intervenes to alleviate her distress by taking different avatars or incarnations, reaffirming the bond between the earth goddess and the cosmic protector. In iconography, Bhumi is often depicted as a beautiful lady clinging to the tusk of her consort Varaha, the boar-man incarnation of Vishnu. Alternatively, Vishnu is often shown standing between Bhudevi and Sri-Lakshmi, symbolizing his protection of both the earth and prosperity.

While Bhudevi continues to be revered, her role in later mythology shifts from the Vedic portrayal of the earth as the stable, fertile ground supporting all life. In the Rigvedic hymns, Prithvi is exalted for her boundless fertility and capacity to sustain all creatures. However, in medieval texts, these qualities are transferred to other goddesses, such as Shakambhari, Lakshmi, and Mahadevi, while Bhudevi's primary role becomes that of a distressed earth, burdened by the weight of wickedness and seeking divine intervention. This transformation highlights Bhudevi’s evolution from an embodiment of the fertile and life-sustaining earth to a more vulnerable figure who requires divine support in times of crisis.

== Significance and Influence ==
=== Prakṛti ===
The concept of Prithvi also intersects with the philosophical idea of the Prakriti-Purusha duality, which is fundamental to the Samkhya system of thought and later Hindu philosophy. David Leeming, Christopher Fee and other scholars note that Prithvi can be seen as a manifestation of Prakriti—the material, feminine principle that is the source of creation and the foundation of the manifest universe. Prakriti is often paired with Purusha, the male principle representing consciousness or spirit. Wangu points out that this pairing can be understood as a development of the earlier Dyaus-Prithvi duality from Vedic literature, where Dyaus (sky) and Prithvi (earth) were the universal parents. In this later philosophical context, Prithvi, as Prakriti, represents the material energy that brings Purusha’s consciousness into manifestation.

Thus, Prithvi’s role in the Prakriti-Purusha concept positions her as more than just a nurturing earth mother. She becomes a central figure in the metaphysical understanding of the universe, symbolizing the dynamic, creative force that makes the world tangible. This philosophical idea reverberates through Hindu cosmology, linking the goddess to the very processes of creation, preservation, and dissolution in the universe.

=== National Imagery ===
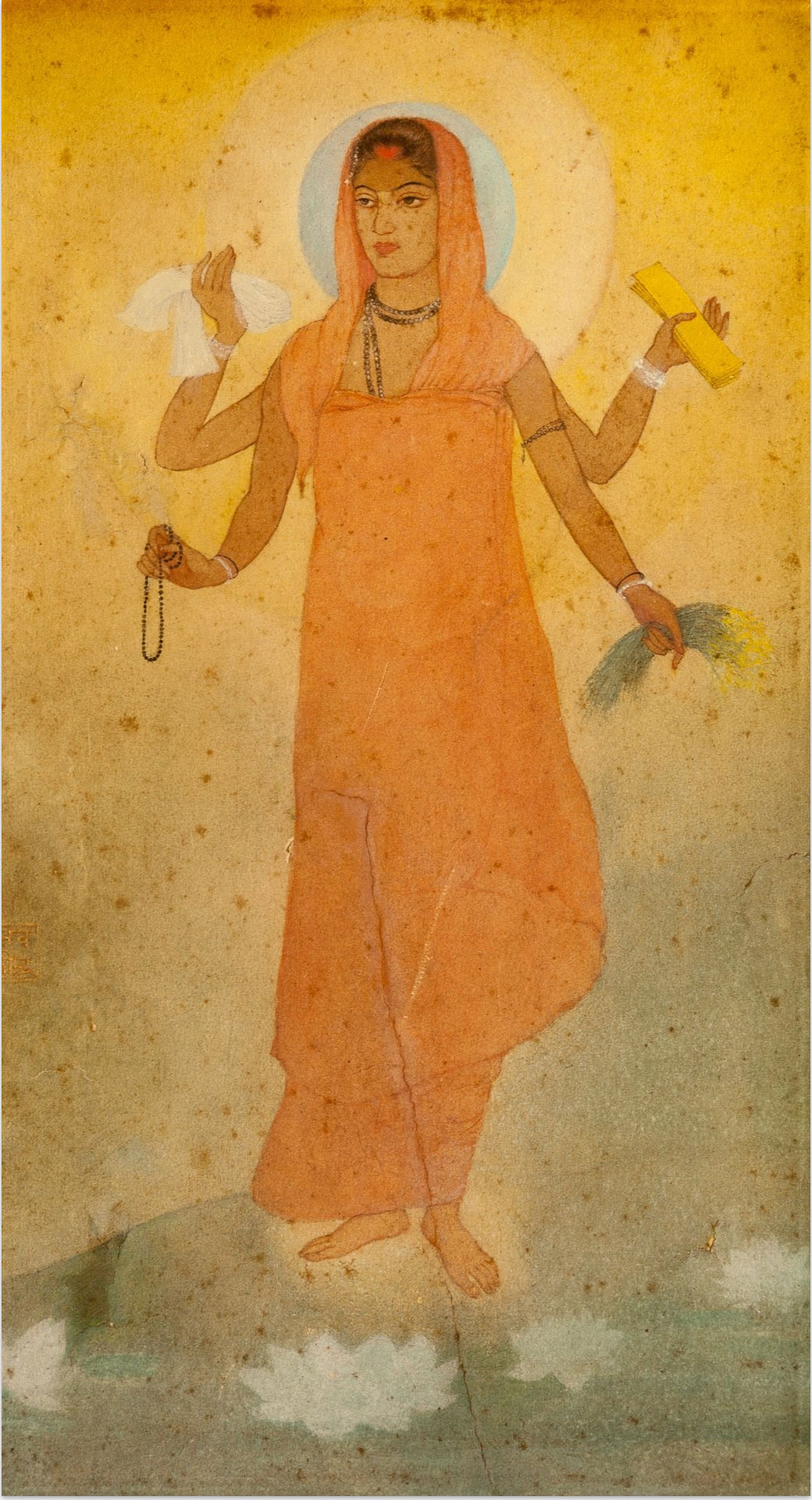
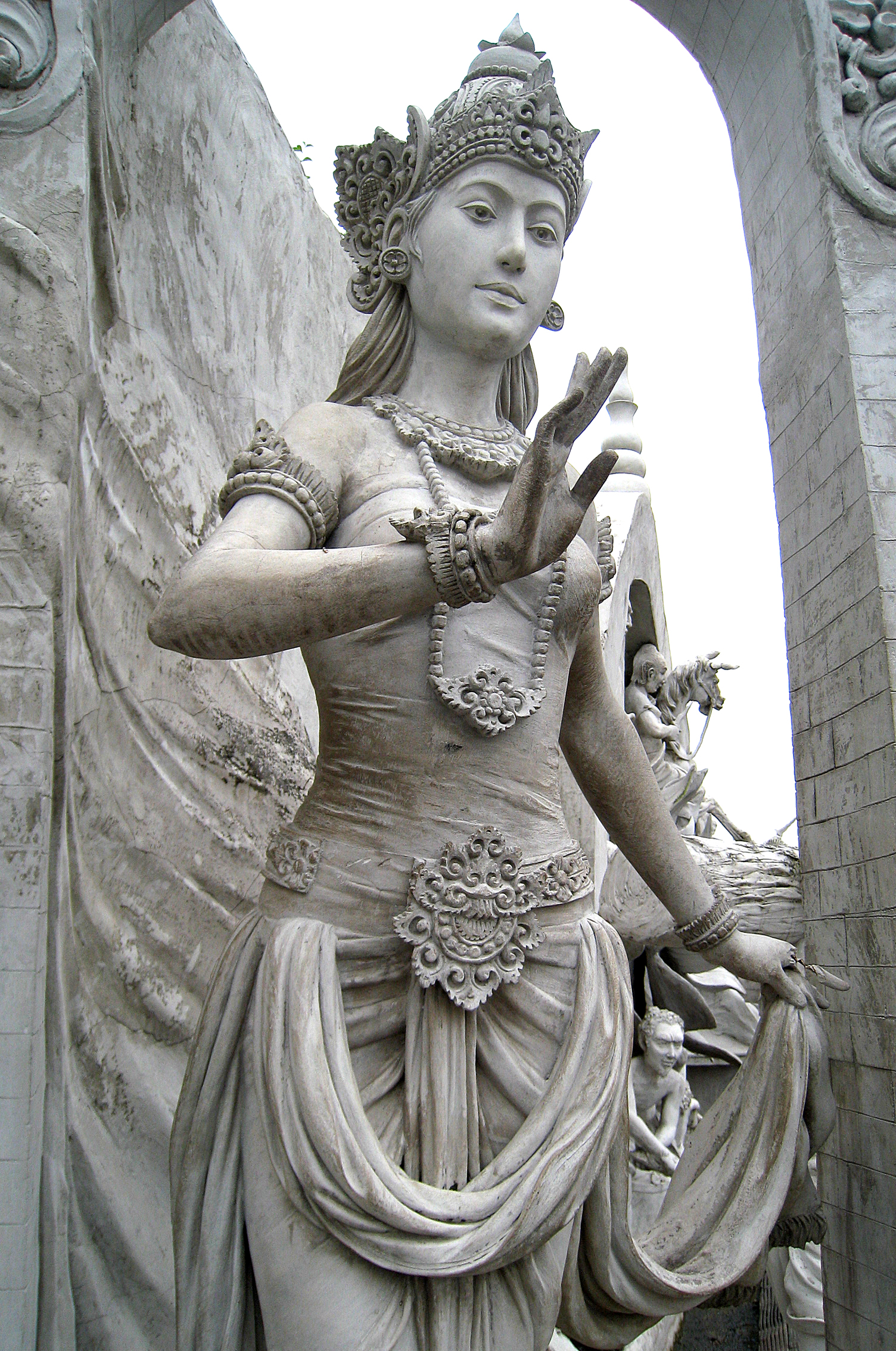
Significance of Prithvi extends beyond her role in Vedic cosmology and creation narratives, playing a pivotal role in later Hindu thought, particularly in the evolving concept of national imagery. Left: Painting of Bharat Mata, the national personification of India, by Abanindranath Tagore. Right: Indonesian depiction of Prithvi in ancient regal attire as Ibu Pertiwi at the Indonesian National Monument

In his analysis, David Kinsley discusses how the concept of Prithvi Mata transforms in later traditions, particularly in the context of Bharat Mata (Mother India), which became a powerful symbol in India’s nationalist movement. Kinsley highlights that the reverence for the land as sacred extends from early Vedic hymns to the modern conceptualization of India itself as a divine mother figure. The image of Prithvi, or Bhudevi, as the Earth Goddess who nurtures and supports life, easily transitioned into a national personification during the Indian independence movement. This modern depiction draws on the ancient idea that the earth is not merely a physical entity but a living, nurturing force. Kinsley connects this with the imagery of Anandamath, Bankim Chandra Chatterjee's novel, where the goddess appears as a symbol of the motherland, and devotees are called upon to protect her at any cost. This reflects the continuity of Prithvi's role as the protective, nurturing mother figure—this time, embodying the Indian subcontinent itself.

Owing to strong historical Hindu influence, the name Prithvi is also used for national personification of Indonesia, where she is referred to as Ibu Pertiwi.

== In Buddhism ==
Prithvi was adopted into Buddhism, and plays a vital role in it, regarded as the first goddess appearing in Early Buddhism in the Pāli Canon. Her essential qualities—nurturing, sustaining, and upholding cosmic order—remained intact, but her role was transformed to fit the Buddhist cosmology.

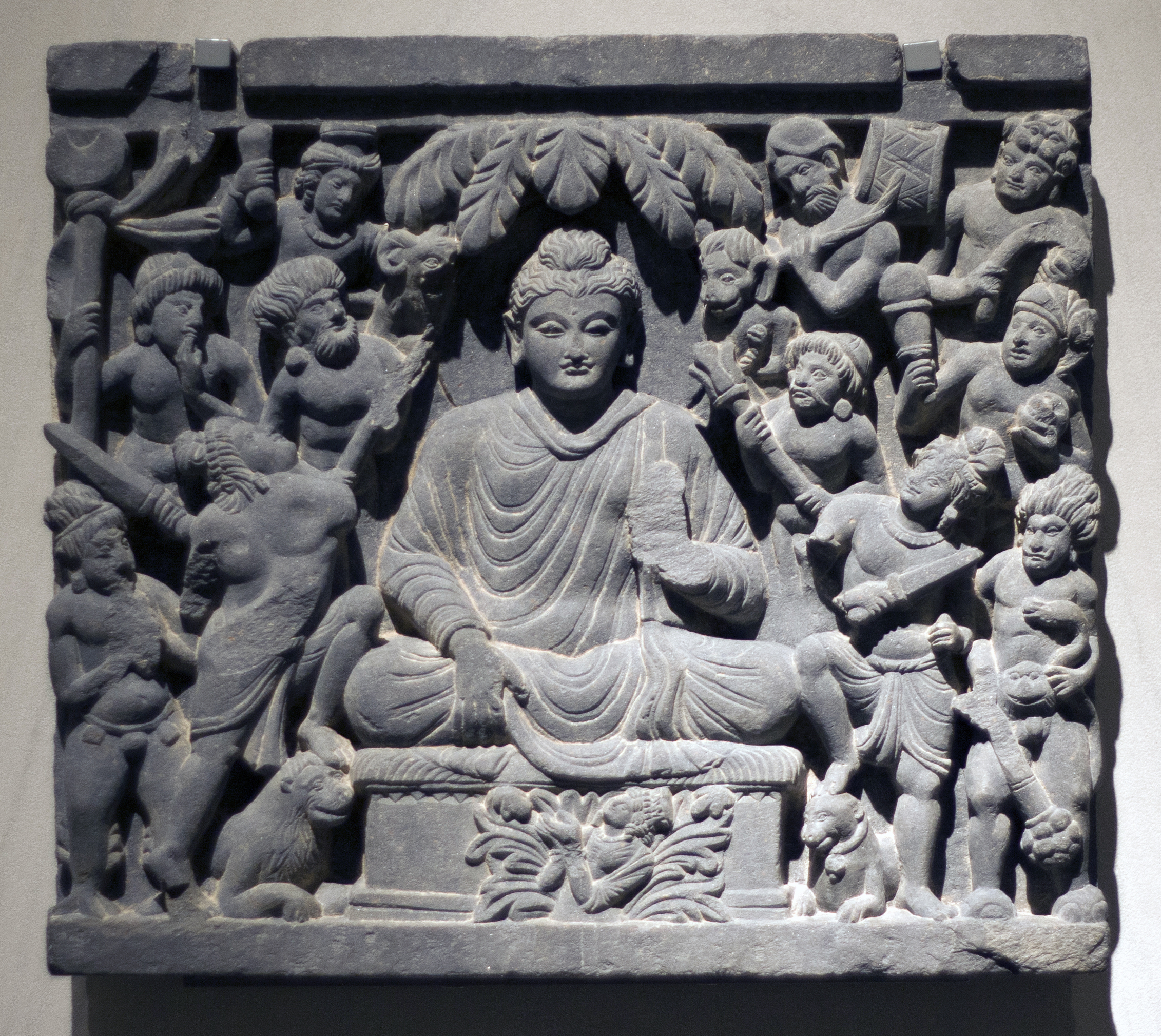
A 3rd-century Gandhara sculpture depicting the Buddha summoning Prithvi, who is shown emerging from the ground beneath the Buddha's seat.

Prithvi's most notable role in Buddhist tradition is during the moment of Shakyamuni Buddha’s enlightenment, known as the Maravijaya (Victory over Mara). As the Bodhisattva Siddhartha Gautama meditated under the Bodhi tree, Mara, the king of demons, sought to prevent his enlightenment by questioning his worthiness and sending an army to disrupt him. When Mara challenged Siddhartha to provide evidence of his past virtuous deeds, the Bodhisattva touched the Earth with his right hand, displaying what is known as the "earth-touching gesture" (bhumisparśa mudra), invoking Prithvi as a witness. Prithvi emerged from the Earth, and dispelled Mara’s forces. This act confirmed that Siddhartha’s journey toward enlightenment was righteous, rooted in the ethical and compassionate life he had lived through many past lifetimes. By calling Prithvi as a witness, Siddhartha demonstrated that enlightenment is not just a spiritual achievement but also deeply connected to one’s actions on Earth. In some versions of the story, such as in the Nidanakatha, she verbally testified to the Bodhisattva’s virtues. In other accounts, like the Mahavastu, her response was more physical, as she caused the Earth to shake, terrifying Mara’s forces. In the Lalitavistara, Prithvi appears in bodily form, emerging from the Earth with her retinue of goddesses. Her presence and the subsequent quaking of the Earth defeated Mara’s armies and created the peaceful environment necessary for the Buddha to attain enlightenment.

Prithvi’s role extends beyond being a moral witness. She is also intimately tied to the throne of enlightenment, where the Buddha attained liberation. This symbolic location, often referred to as the navel of the Earth or vajrāsana, is seen as the center of the world, where the spiritual and material realms converge. Prithvi’s association with this spot signifies her importance in the Buddha’s journey, as it was only at this exact location, the most stable and sacred place on Earth, that Shakyamuni Buddha could achieve enlightenment. In this sense, Prithvi provides not only moral support but also the physical foundation for the Buddha’s final realization.

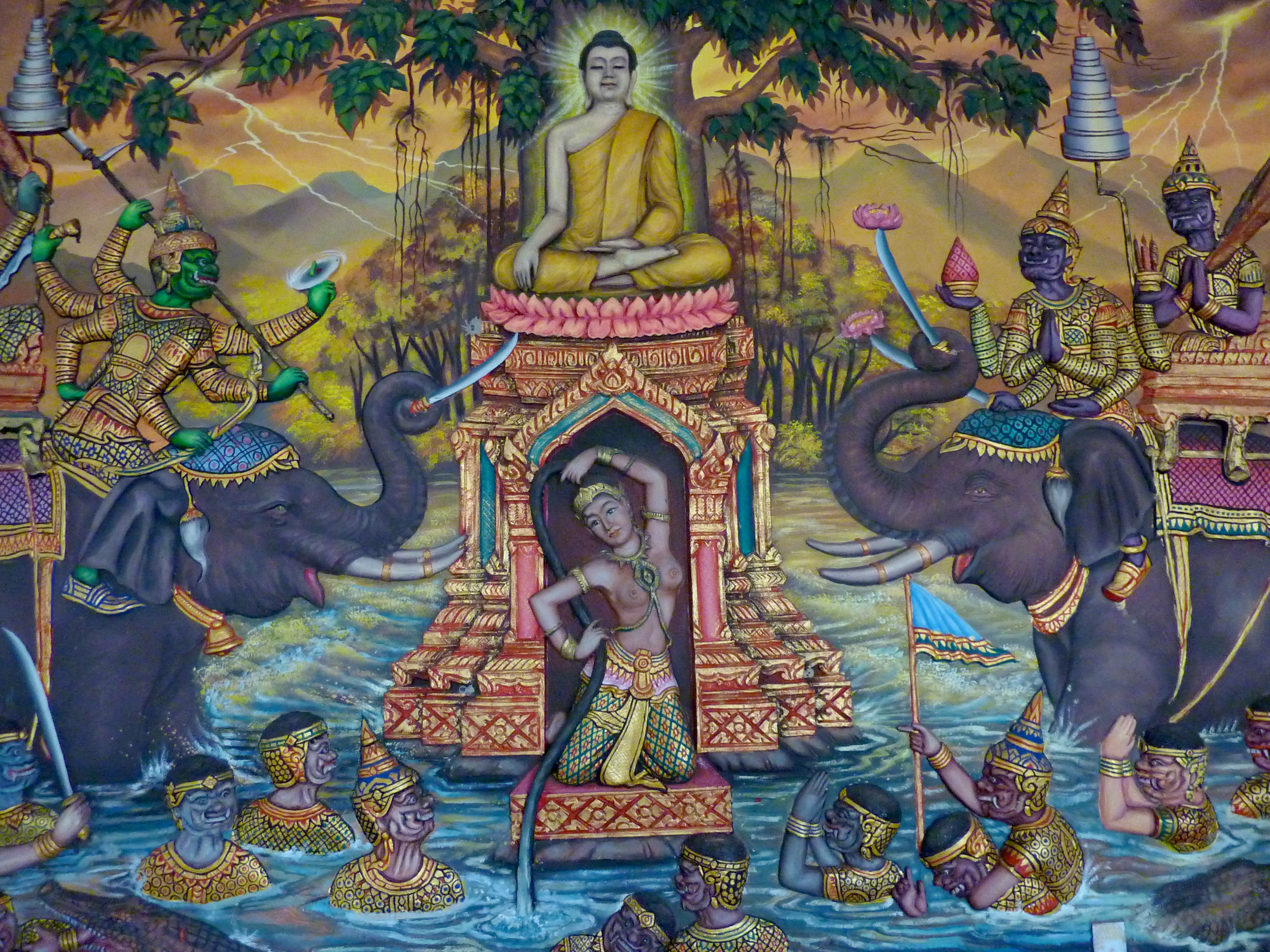
A Thai painting showing Prithvi saving Buddha from demons of Mara

In Buddhist art, Prithvi is often depicted at the base of the Buddha’s throne during the moment of his enlightenment. The Gandharan reliefs from the 1st to 3rd centuries CE frequently portray her emerging from the Earth with her head and torso visible, symbolizing her connection to nature and her role as a stabilizing force. She is sometimes shown with a vase of plenty, brimming with jewels or lotuses, representing her abundance and nurturing qualities. Later, in the Gupta period (4th to 6th centuries CE), Prithvi is also depicted holding a vessel, symbolizing the spiritual and material wealth that she nurtures. In some Southeast Asian traditions, she wrings water from her hair which drowns Mara's army, symbolizing the spiritual merit accumulated by the Buddha over many lifetimes.

In Chinese Buddhism, she, with the name Ditian(地天) is considered one of the Twenty-Four Protective Deities (二十四諸天 Èrshísì zhūtiān) and is usually enshrined in the Mahavira Hall of Buddhist temples along with the other devas.
