= Mat Zemlya =

Slavic mother goddess

Mat Zemlya (Matka Ziemia or Matushka Zeml'ja) (Note: The affectionate appellation "Matushka" ("Dear Mother") is sometimes used to refer to natural phenomena, such as the earth and rivers.) is an East Slavic personification of earth acting as a deity. She is also called Mati Syra Zemlya meaning Mother Damp Earth or Mother Moist Earth.

== Mythology ==
Old Slavic beliefs seem to attest some awareness of an ambivalent nature of the Earth: it was considered men's cradle and nurturer during one's lifetime, and, when the time of death came, it would open up to receive their bones, as if it were a "return to the womb". (Note: Joanna Hubbs claims that "the Russian peasant envisioned the underworld of the ancestors as a house heated against the dampness of Mother Moist Earth by a stove."; Joanna Hubbs claims that "Among the peasantry in Vladimir Province, as in other places, it was customary for the dying to ask earth permission to reenter her body with the ritual invocation: 'Mother Moist Earth, forgive me and take me'.") (Note: "The peasant child who died left its natal mother and went back to 'mother earth'. (...) That Russians did (and still do) personify the earth as a mother is well known. The peasant topos 'mother moist earth' ('mat' syra zemlia') refers to the mother specifically as a place one goes after dying, or in order to die (as opposed to a fertile place which gives birth to a harvest - for which there are other topoi). Ransel speaks of peasant beliefs about the earth pulling the child back to itself, inviting death. (...) To resist death too much is to resist 'mother moist earth'.") (Note: "Symbolically, funeral rites provide the belief that the deceased will return to mother earth to live a new life in a new abode (the coffin and grave). According to Russian folk belief, the deceased no longer lives in its former home but continues a liminal existence in a new “dwelling-place,” that is the coffin, which in some parts of Russia even had windows (Vostochnoslavianskaia 348). (...) In this context, the motif of life in the funeral lament is similar to the archetypal figure of the Moist Mother Earth (Mati syra zemlia) in its representation of rebirth. In these laments, the deceased is portrayed as being returned to the Moist Mother Earth, but before settling in her “permanent nest” it is carried into its new room—the coffin. С попом—отцом духовныим / Да с петьем божьим церковныим! / Как схороним тебя, белая лебедушка, / Во матушку сыру землю / И во буеву холодную могилушку, / В вековечну, бесконечну тебя жирушку, / Закроем тебя матушкой сырой землей, / Замуравим тебя травонькой шелковою! (Chistov 237) [With a priest, with a spiritual father / And with the swimming of God’s Church / How will we bury you, little white swan / In the Damp Mother Earth / In the cold little grave / In the eternal, heavenly home / We will cover you with the Damp Mother Earth / We will cover you with silk grass]. (...) Funeral rituals, thus, reinforced the link between the living and the departed while allowing the deceased to rest permanently in its new domicile—the cosmic womb that is the Moist Mother Earth.")

The imagery of the "moist earth" also appears in funeral lamentations either as a geographical feature (as in Lithuanian and Ukrainian lamentations) or invoked as "Mother Moist Earth". (Note: For example: "The maiden fair is dead (...) Split open, damp Mother Earth! / Fly asunder, ye coffin planks!"; "A young sergeant prayed to God, / Weeping the while, as a river flows,/ For the recent death of the Emperor, / The Emperor, Peter the First. / And thus amid his sobs he spake, - / 'Split asunder, O damp mother Earth / On all four sides - / Open, ye coffin planks (...)'"; "All on my father's grave / A star has fallen, has fallen from heaven ... / Split open, O dart of the thunder, The moist mother Earth!"; "I will take my dear children [and see], / Whether moist Mother Earth will not split open. / If moist Mother Earth splits open, / Straightway will I and my children bury ourselves in it (...) Split open, moist Mother Earth, / And be thou open, O new coffin-planks (...) (a widow's lament)"; "Arise, O ye wild winds, from all sides! Be ye borne, O winds, into the Church of God! Sweep open the moist earth! Strike, O wild winds, on the great bell! Will not its sounds and mine awaken words of kindness" (an orphan's lament).) (Note: The expression is also mentioned in a saying from Olonets: the master of the house invites his ghostly visitor to warm itself by the fire of the pech, since it must have been cold for him staying "in the moist earth".) (Note: In a adjuration by a Raskol, the supplicant invokes her to forgive them: "Forgive me, O Lord; forgive me, O holy Mother of God; (...) forgive, O damp-mother-earth; (...)".) (Note: In a funeral lament collected in the Olonets region by scholar Barsov, the mourner cries for a man struck by lightning sent by "thunderous" Saint Ilya, when said man was supposed to perform his Christian duties: "They lit candles of bright wax, / They prayed to God diligently, / They bowed low to moist mother earth / (...) The sinful soul departed without repentance/ (...)/ [His body] will not be committed to moist mother earth.")

The Slavic epic bogatyr Mikula Selyaninovich, or Mikula the Villager, has his power from Mat Zemlya.

== See also ==
- Māra in Latvian folklore
- Mother Russia
- Mother Earth
- Zam
