= Spandaramet =

Armenian goddess of death

Spandaramet (Armenian: Սպանդարամետ, Armenian pronunciation: [spɑntʰaɹamɛt]) or Sandaramet (Սանդարամետ, Armenian pronunciation: [sɑntʰaɹamɛt]) was the Armenian name of the Zoroastrian yazata (angelic divinity) Spenta Armaiti, one of the six Amesha Spentas, and the guardian of the earth.

The name is attested in two forms in Armenian. Spandaramet, most likely derived from Northwestern Middle Iranian, and Sandaramet ("Hades, the underworld"), which is derived from a Southwestern Iranian variant, possibly the Old form.

It is uncertain when the name Sandaramet entered Armenian; it may have taken place under the Achaemenid Empire (550–330 BC). The spelling is used in the Armenian translation of the Bible, where a derivative adjective, sandarametakan, is also used. The 5th-century Armenian author Agathangelos uses the word sandarametakan nnĵecealkc ("those asleep in the underworld") to refer to the dead.

The usage of word to refer to the underworld indicates that its introduction to Armenian took place during a period when earth was seen as the home of the dead. Sandaramet was probably seen as the divinity of the underworld as the result of an amalgamation of Zoroastrian and ancient beliefs.

According to the medieval Armenian historian Tovma Artsruni, the Artaxiad Armenian king Artaxias II (r. 75–69 BC) had "temples of Herakles and Dionysos" constructed in Vaspurakan. Herakles corresponds to Vahagn, and Dionysos most likely to Spandaramet.

In the account of Agathangelos, the Arsacid Armenian king Tiridates III (r. 298–330 AD) mentions the "šahapet of the tombs", which most likely refers to Spandaramet. The Armenian word šahapet (derived from Old Persian xšaθrapati) was used to refer to supernatural beings.

== Sources ==
- Russell, James R. (1986). "Armenia and Iran iii. Armenian Religion". In Yarshater, Ehsan (ed.). Encyclopædia Iranica. Vol. II/4: Architecture IV–Armenia and Iran IV. London and New York: Routledge & Kegan Paul. pp. 438–444. ISBN 978-0-71009-104-8.
- Frenschkowski, Marco (2015). "Christianity". In Stausberg, Michael; Vevaina, Yuhan Sohrab-Dinshaw; Tessmann, Anna (eds.). The Wiley Blackwell Companion to Zoroastrianism. John Wiley And Sons Ltd. pp. 457–477.
- Russell, James R. (1987). Zoroastrianism in Armenia. Harvard University Press. ISBN 978-0674968509.
