= Sepandārmazgān =

Ancient Iranian holiday

- Official name: Sepandārmazgān
- Also called: Esfandegan
- Observed by: Zoroastrians, Iranians
- Type: Historical, National, Zoroastrian
- Celebrations: Nurses' Day, Mardgiran, Barzegaran Festival
- Observances: Men giving gifts to their wives and mothers
- Date: February 24
- Frequency: Annual

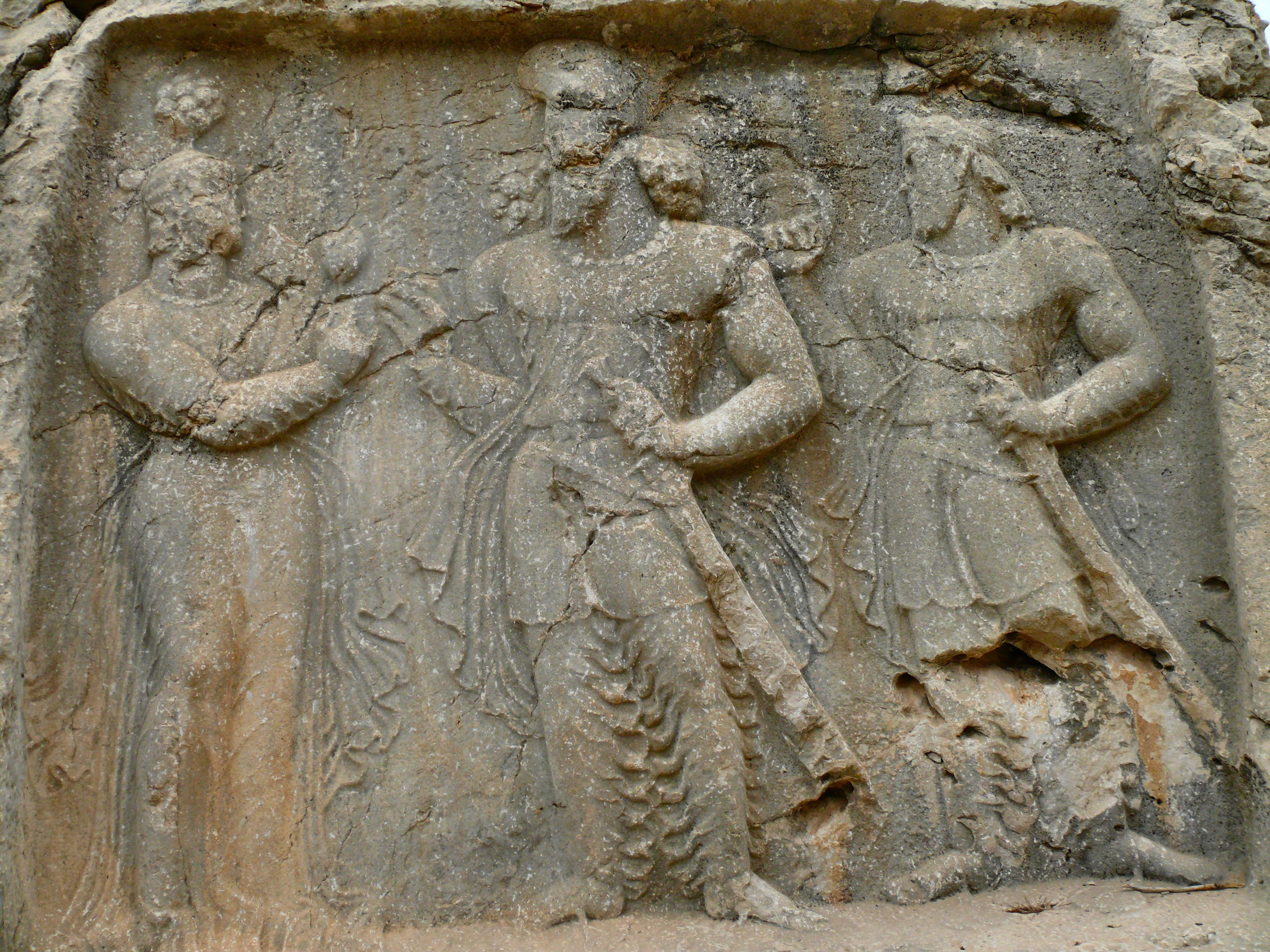
Sasanian king Bahram II’s family scene at Sarab-e Qandil, showing the queen offering a lotus flower to her king

Sepandārmazgān is an ancient Iranian day of women celebrated on the 5th day of Spandarmad, a day dedicated to the Zoroastrian deity Spənta Ārmaiti. The festival used to be dedicated to women, and men would make them "liberal presents".

The jashn-e barzegarán (Festival of Agriculturists), is celebrated in Iran also on the 5th day of Spandarmad month (the Spandarmad day). People pray for good harvest, honor the deity of Earth Spandārmad, and put signs on doors to destroy evil spirits.

== Name ==
In New Persian, the day is called Sepandārmazgān (سپندارمذگان) or Espandegān (اسپندگان). It is named after the month Esfand and the Spənta Ārmaiti (Avestan for "Holy Devotion", Spandārmad in Middle Persian, Persian: سپندارمذ Spendārmad or Sepandarmaz), the Amesha Spenta who is given the domain of "earth".

== History ==
Descriptions of this festival are given in medieval historiographical sources such as Gardizi, Biruni and Al-Masudi.

According to Biruni, it was a day where women rested and men had to bring them gifts. In the section about Persian calendar, Biruni writes in The Remaining Signs of Past Centuries that:

On the 5th day or Isfahdmah-Roz (day of Isfand), there is a feast on account of the identity of the names of the month and the day. Isfandarmah is charged with the care of the earth and with that the good, chaste, and beneficient wife who loves her husband. In the past times, this was a special feast of the women, when the men used to make them liberal presents. This custom is still flourishing in Ispahan, Ray, and in other districts of Fahla. In Persian it is called Mardgiran.

Furthermore, Biruni notes that on this day, commoners ate raisins and pomegranate seeds.

According to Gardizi, this celebration was special for women, and they called this day also mard-giran (Persian: مردگیران, literally "possessing of men").

== Modern revival ==
The revival of the festival dates to the Pahlavi dynasty, advocated by Ebrahim Pourdavoud as "Nurses' Day" (روز پرستار) in 1962.

The observation of this festival has been revived in modern Iran, where it is mostly set on the 5th day of Esfand in the Solar Hejri calendar introduced in 1925, corresponding to 24 February. The modern festival is a celebration day of love towards mothers and wives. It is celebrated as Esbandi in Kashan area.

== See also ==
- Persian culture
- Iranian woman
