= Spenta Armaiti =

Female divine entity in Zoroastrianism

- Spenta Armaiti; Amesha Spenta of Devotion/Harmony
- Avestan: Spenta Armaiti 𐬯𐬞𐬆𐬧𐬙𐬀 𐬁𐬭𐬨𐬀𐬌𐬙𐬌
- Affiliation: Yazata, Amesha Spenta
- Attributes: Purview over the Earth, Fertility, Childbirth, Women
- Enemy: The Daeva Nanghait
- Day: 5th of each month in the Zoroastrian calendar
- Gender: Female
- Festivals: Sepandārmazgān
- Associated deities: Zam

In Zoroastrianism, Spenta Armaiti (Avestan: 𐬯𐬞𐬆𐬧𐬙𐬀 𐬁𐬭𐬨𐬀𐬌𐬙𐬌, romanized: spəṇta ārma^{i}ti, "Holy Devotion") is one of the Amesha Spentas, the seven divine manifestations of Wisdom and is considered the daughter of Ahura Mazda. While older sources present the Amesha Spentas more as abstract entities, in later sources Spenta Armaiti is personified as a female divinity with connotations of harmony and devotion.

== Name ==
Spenta Armaiti is known in later Iranian languages as Spandarmad (in Middle Persian) and Isfandārmaḏ (in Modern Persian).

Sometimes Armaiti is paired with other Zoroastrian deity, Zam ('earth'), another being associated with the Earth, thus forming a compound Zam-Armaiti or Zam-Armatay.

== Cultic role ==
Just like every other member within the Heptad, Ārmaiti shares an intimate bond with Ahura Mazdā, a connection metaphorically described by Zoroaster as that of a "daughter" to him.

She is associated with the earth and sacred literature describes her as a Mother Nature figure. Thus, she is linked to fertility and farming. (Note: She is "the Old Iranian goddess of cultivated land, vegetation and fertility, having a link with the rite of inhumation (...)" and to whom "the material earth belongs".) (Note: "In the realm of the material world, Spenta Armaiti is the guardian spirit of the earth (Vendidad 3.35), the symbol of bountifulness (...) as well as the protector of herdsmen and farmers. Frequently, however, she is spoken of as the earth itself rather than as the genius of the earth (Yasna 16.10; Yasht 24.50; Vendidad 2.10, 2.14, 2.18, 18.51, 18.64). ... in the physical realm she represents, and later becomes, the earth.")

She is also associated with the dead and the underworld.

== Religious legacy ==
In the Zoroastrian calendar, she is associated with the twelfth month (Persian: سپندارمذ Spendārmad) and the fifth day of the month. The fifth day of the twelfth month is hence her holy day, Sepandārmazgān. Sepandārmazgān is an ancient festival to celebrate eternal love. Iranian lovers give each other gifts on this day.

== Parallels ==
Scholarship states that Armaiti is equivalent to a RigVedic entity named Aramati.

In Armenian mythology, her name appears as Sandaramet (Armenian: Սանդարամետ).
