= C. J. Cherryh bibliography =

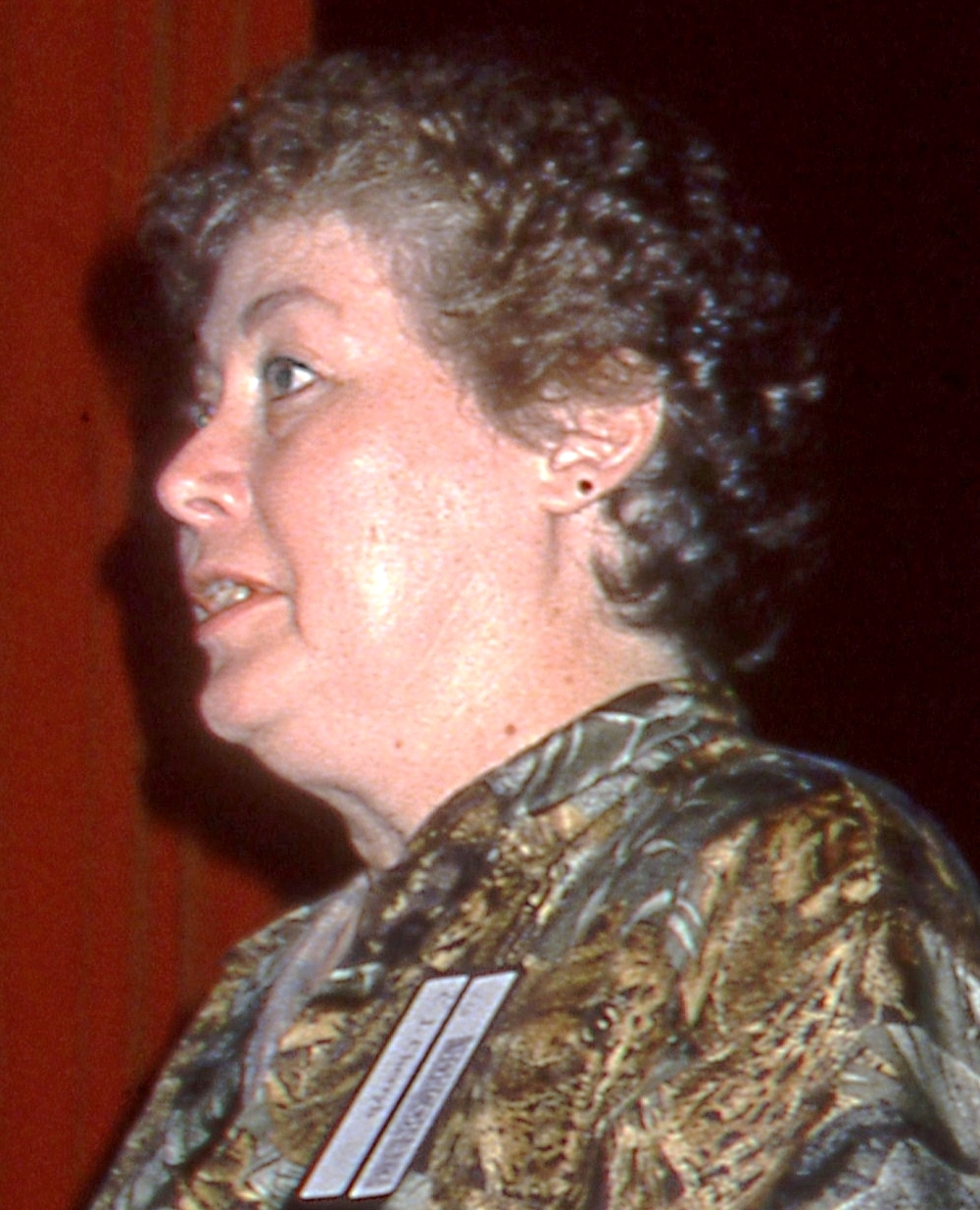
C. J. Cherryh at Norcon 12, Oslo, Norway, August 1994.

American writer C. J. Cherryh's career began with publication of her first books in 1976, Gate of Ivrel and Brothers of Earth. She has been a prolific science fiction and fantasy author since then, publishing over 80 novels, short-story compilations, with continuing production as her blog attests. Cherryh has received the Hugo and Locus Awards for some of her novels.

Her novels are divided into various spheres, focusing mostly around the Alliance–Union universe, the Foreigner series and her fantasy novels.

== The Alliance–Union universe ==
The Alliance–Union universe is a science fiction future history series, in which the development of political entities and cultures occurs over a long time period. Major characters in one work may be referenced or appear briefly in another.

=== The Hinder Stars ===
The novels take place before the beginning of the Company Wars

- Alliance Rising (2019; credited to C. J. Cherryh and Jane S. Fancher) – Prometheus Award winner 2020
- Alliance Unbound (2024; credited to Cherryh and Fancher)

=== The Company Wars ===
According to the author, the novels in this universe, except Heavy Time and Hellburner (which were subsequently re-published in one volume as Devil to the Belt), can be read in any order. Those two books are chronologically the earliest in the series.

- Heavy Time (1991)
- Hellburner (1992)
  - Devil to the Belt (2000) – single-volume edition of the above two books
- Downbelow Station (1981) – Hugo Award winner, Locus Award nominee, 1982
- Rimrunners (1989) – Locus Award nominee, 1990
- Merchanter's Luck (1982)
  - also published in the Alliance Space (2008) omnibus
- Tripoint (1994)
- Finity's End (1997) – Locus Award nominee, 1998

=== The Chanur novels ===
- The Pride of Chanur (1981) – Hugo Award and Locus Award nominee, 1983
- Chanur's Venture (1984) – Locus Award nominee, 1985
- The Kif Strike Back (1985)
  - The Chanur Saga (2000) – single-volume edition of the above three books
- Chanur's Homecoming (1986)
- Chanur's Legacy (1992)
  - Chanur's Endgame (2007) – single-volume edition of the above two books

=== Unionside ===
- Forty Thousand in Gehenna (1983)
  - Also published in the Alliance Space (2008) omnibus
- Cyteen (1988) – Hugo Award and Locus Award winner, British Science Fiction Award nominee, 1989
  - Also published in a three-volume edition as The Betrayal, The Rebirth and The Vindication, about which Cherryh has written, "There was a paperbound publication that split the novel into three parts, but this has ended: the current and, by my wishes, all future publications, will have Cyteen as one unified book."
- Regenesis (2009)

=== The Age of Exploration ===
These novels share a common theme, but are unrelated to each other and can be read in any order.

- Port Eternity (1982)
  - also published in the Alternate Realities (2000) omnibus
- Voyager in Night (1984) – Philip K. Dick Award nominee, 1984
  - also published in the Alternate Realities (2000) omnibus
- Cuckoo's Egg (1985) – Hugo Award nominee, 1986
  - also published in The Deep Beyond (2005) omnibus

=== The Mri Wars ===
These novels take place about 400 years after the Company wars.

- The Faded Sun: Kesrith (1978) – Hugo Award and Locus Award nominee, 1979; Nebula Award nominee, 1978
- The Faded Sun: Shon'Jir (1978)
- The Faded Sun: Kutath (1979)
  - The Faded Sun Trilogy (UK, 1987 and US, 2000) – single-volume edition of the above three books

=== The Era of Rapprochement ===
- Serpent's Reach (1980)
  - Also published in The Deep Beyond (2005) omnibus
- Wave Without a Shore (1981)
  - Also published in the Alternate Realities (2000) omnibus
- The Scapegoat (1985) – novella

=== The Hanan Rebellion ===
- Brothers of Earth (1976)
- Hunter of Worlds (1977)
  - At the Edge of Space (2003) – single-volume edition of the above two books

=== Merovingen Nights ===
The Merovin stories take place about 1000 years after the Company Wars

- Angel with the Sword (1985)
  - Merovingen Nights – shared world series of anthologies (see "As Editor" below)

=== The Morgaine Cycle ===
- Gate of Ivrel (1976)
- Well of Shiuan (1978)
- Fires of Azeroth (1979)
- Exile's Gate (1988)

the first three were collected in the following editions:

- The Book of Morgaine (1979)
- The Chronicles of Morgaine (1985)
- The Morgaine Saga (2000)

All four novels were collected in the following edition:

- The Complete Morgaine (2015)

== The Foreigner series ==
- Trilogy arc 1
  - Foreigner (1994) – Locus SF Award nominee, 1995
  - Invader (1995) – Locus SF Award nominee, 1996
  - Inheritor (1996)
- Trilogy arc 2
  - Precursor (1999)
  - Defender (2001) – Locus SF Award nominee, 2002
  - Explorer (2003)
- Trilogy arc 3
  - Destroyer (2005)
  - Pretender (2006)
  - Deliverer (2007)
- Trilogy arc 4
  - Conspirator (2009)
  - Deceiver (2010)
  - Betrayer (2011)
- Trilogy arc 5
  - Intruder (2012)
  - Protector (2013)
  - Peacemaker (2014)
- Trilogy arc 6
  - Tracker (2015)
  - Visitor (2016) – Locus SF Award nominee, 2017
  - Convergence (2017)
- Trilogy arc 7
  - Emergence (2018)
  - Resurgence (2020)
  - Divergence (2020)
- Trilogy arc 8
  - Defiance (2023; with Jane Fancher)

== Other science fiction ==
=== Finisterre universe ===
- Rider at the Gate (1995)
- Cloud's Rider (1996)

=== Gene Wars ===
- Hammerfall (2001) – John W. Campbell Award nominee, 2002
- Forge of Heaven (2004)

=== Miscellaneous ===
- "Cassandra" (1978) – short story, Hugo Award winner, 1979
- Hestia (1979)

== Fantasy works ==
=== The Fortress series ===
- Fortress in the Eye of Time (1995) – Locus Fantasy Award nominee, 1996
- Fortress of Eagles (1998) – Locus Fantasy Award nominee, 1999
- Fortress of Owls (1999) – Locus Fantasy Award nominee, 2000
- Fortress of Dragons (2000)
- Fortress of Ice (2006)

=== Ealdwood ===
- Ealdwood (1981 novella)
- The Dreamstone (1983 novel) – includes material from Cherryh's short story "The Dreamstone" (1979) and the novella Ealdwood
- The Tree of Swords and Jewels (1983 novel)
- Arafel's Saga (1983) – single-volume edition of The Dreamstone (1983) and The Tree of Swords and Jewels (1983)
- Ealdwood (1991) – single-volume edition of The Dreamstone (1983) and The Tree of Swords and Jewels (1983) with revisions and a new ending
- The Dreaming Tree (1997) – single-volume edition of The Dreamstone (1983) and The Tree of Swords and Jewels (1983) with the Ealdwood (1991) revisions

=== The Russian stories ===
- Rusalka (1989) – Locus Fantasy Award nominee, 1990
  - Rusalka (2010) – revised ebook edition
- Chernevog (1990)
  - Chernevog (2012) – revised ebook edition (credited to C. J. Cherryh and Jane Fancher)
- Yvgenie (1991)
  - Yvgenie (2012) – revised ebook edition

=== Heroes in Hell ===
- The Gates of Hell (1986), novel with Janet Morris
- Kings in Hell (1986), novel with Janet Morris
- Legions of Hell (1987)

=== Miscellaneous fantasy ===
- The Brothers (1986) – novella
- The Paladin (1988) – Locus Fantasy Award nominee, 1989
- The Goblin Mirror (1992)
- Faery in Shadow (1993)
  - Faery Moon (2009) – revised ebook edition of Faery in Shadow, plus its prequel, The Brothers
- Lois & Clark: A Superman Novel (1996)

== Collections ==
=== Omnibuses ===
- The Book of Morgaine (1979) – Gate of Ivrel (1976), Well of Shiuan (1978) and Fires of Azeroth (1979)
- Arafel's Saga (1983) – The Dreamstone (1983) and The Tree of Swords and Jewels (1983)
- The Chronicles of Morgaine (1985) – Gate of Ivrel (1976), Well of Shiuan (1978) and Fires of Azeroth (1979)
- Ealdwood (1991) – The Dreamstone (1983) and The Tree of Swords and Jewels (1983) with revisions and a new ending
- The Dreaming Tree (1997) – The Dreamstone (1983) and The Tree of Swords and Jewels (1983) with revisions and a new ending
- The Morgaine Saga (2000) – Gate of Ivrel (1976), Well of Shiuan (1978) and Fires of Azeroth (1979)
- The Faded Sun Trilogy (2000) – Kesrith (1978), Shon'Jir (1978) and Kutath (1979)
- The Chanur Saga (2000) – The Pride of Chanur (1981), Chanur's Venture (1984) and The Kif Strike Back (1985)
- Devil to the Belt (2000) – Heavy Time (1991) and Hellburner (1992)
- Alternate Realities (2000) – Wave Without a Shore (1981), Port Eternity (1982) and Voyager in Night (1984)
- At the Edge of Space (2003) – Brothers of Earth (1976) and Hunter of Worlds (1977)
- The Deep Beyond (2005) – Serpent's Reach (1980) and Cuckoo's Egg (1985)
- Chanur's Endgame (2007) – Chanur's Homecoming (1986) and Chanur's Legacy (1992)
- Alliance Space (2008) – Merchanter's Luck (1982) and Forty Thousand in Gehenna (1983)

=== Short fiction ===
- Sunfall (1981) – short stories and novelettes
- Visible Light (1986) – short stories, novelettes and novellas
- Glass and Amber (1987) – short stories and essays
- The Collected Short Fiction of C. J. Cherryh (2004) – short stories, novelettes and novellas, including those in Sunfall and Visible Light

=== Anthologies ===
- Altered States: a cyberpunk sci-fi anthology (2014) – "Mech" (1992)
- Numerous contributions to the original Thieves' World anthology series between 1981 and 1989

== Other works ==
=== As editor ===
The Merovingen Nights shared-world anthologies are set on the world of Merovin in Cherryh's Alliance–Union universe. They are collections of interrelated short stories written by Cherryh and others. Cherryh's novel Angel with the Sword precedes book #1 in this series.

1. Festival Moon (1987)
2. Fever Season (1987)
3. Troubled Waters (1988)
4. Smuggler's Gold (1988)
5. Divine Right (1989)
6. Flood Tide (1990)
7. Endgame (1991)

=== As translator ===
From French to English:

- The Green Gods (1980), by N. C. Henneberg (Nathalie and Charles Henneberg)
- Stellar Crusade (1980), by Pierre Barbet
- The Book of Shai (1982), by Daniel Walther
- Shai's Destiny (1985), by Daniel Walther

=== Other credits ===
Cherryh did not write the three novels in the Sword of Knowledge series, but received co-author's credit because she penned a foreword to each. The publisher removed Cherryh's introductions from most or all editions of these works.

- A Dirge for Sabis (1989), by Cherryh and Leslie Fish
- Wizard Spawn (1989), by Cherryh and Nancy Asire
- Reap the Whirlwind (1989), by Cherryh and Mercedes Lackey
  - The Sword of Knowledge (1995) – omnibus

=== Scholarship ===
Works about C. J. Cherryh written by others.

- The Cherryh Odyssey (2004), by Edward Carmien – a collection of essays by academics, critics and authors about C. J. Cherryh
