= The Chronicles of Morgaine =

1985 science fantasy omnibus by C. J. Cherryh

The Chronicles of Morgaine is a 1985 omnibus of the first three science fantasy novels from The Morgaine Stories by C. J. Cherryh. The three novels included are Gate of Ivrel, Well of Shiuan and Fires of Azeroth.

== Plot summary ==
The Chronicles of Morgaine is a story in which Morgaine must deal with the alien transdimensional Gates that pose a danger to all the worlds .

== Reception ==
Colin Greenland reviewed The Chronicles of Morgaine for Imagine magazine, and stated that "Cherryh's sword and sorcery is sombre and strong. She enters the minds and hearts of her characters as they struggle, with the odds and with each other."

== Reviews ==
- Review by Helen McNabb (1985) in Paperback Inferno, #56
