= Finisterre universe =

Fictional universe created by C. J. Cherryh

- First edition of Rider at the Gate
- Rider at the Gate; Cloud's Rider
- Author: C. J. Cherryh
- Country: United States
- Genre: Science fiction, horror fiction
- Publisher: Warner Books
- Published: 1995–1996
- Media type: Print (hardcover and paperback)

The Finisterre universe is a fictional universe created by American science fiction and fantasy author C. J. Cherryh. Currently, it comprises a series of two science fiction / horror novels written by Cherryh, Rider at the Gate (1995) and Cloud's Rider (1996), also known as The Rider Series. They were published by Warner Books in the US and Hodder & Stoughton in the United Kingdom. The series is about the descendants of lost colonists stranded many generations ago on the hostile planet of Finisterre. For continuity, the two novels should be read in publication sequence.

== Background ==
Finisterre ("End of the Earth") is an Earth-like planet targeted for colonisation, but the colonists soon discover that what they thought was a hospitable world is not suitable for humans at all because the local fauna is telepathic. These creatures send and receive images to and from the ambient, which the unwary humans intercepted, resulting in a mind-clouding "noise" that distressed many of the settlers and even drove some of them mad. To make matters worse, the mothership that delivered the colonists to the planet never returned. Underscoring the colonists' difficult situation, Cherryh has described Anne McCaffrey's Pern and Marion Zimmer Bradley's Darkover worlds as having the same underlying characteristic as Finisterre in terms of being "a bad real estate deal."

With nowhere to go, Finisterre's colonists therefore built and retreated into encampments surrounded by wooden palisade walls, and hid behind religious dogma based on fear and ignorance. The "beasts" on the planet and the "noise" they made terrified the humans. The preachers referred to these beasts as the work of the Devil and condemned any contact with them. Typical refrains from the church were:

Harken not to the beasts.
Death and damnation to the followers of the beasts!
Pray for your children, that they follow not the beasts.

But a group of men and women known as riders turned their back on the church and partnered up with some of the planet's nighthorses, alien horse-like animals. The riders became a necessary evil to keep the fragile human settlements alive: they supplied and protected the villages and towns. The preachers continued their rhetoric and conveniently forgot that while a rider can survive without a village, a village cannot survive without riders.

== Finisterre ==
Finisterre is Earth-like in many respects with ore-rich mountains, large forests, fertile land and plenty of water. But the comparison ends there: the native fauna, from tiny wally-boos and willy-wisps, to large goblin cats, spook bears and nighthorses are telepathic. The animals project into the surrounding ambient what it is they see and feel. These "sendings" are picked up by other animals in the vicinity, alerting them to the presence of friend or foe before they come into view. The animals "see" around themselves by monitoring the ambient. But some of the creatures are smart and can camouflage themselves in the ambient. Predatory goblin cats can project themselves, for example, as small willy-wisps. Others can hide by sending images of themselves being somewhere else. Spook bears can send out any image they have ever received and make you believe it is real and happening right now. Finisterre was a frightening place for the early settlers.

The colonists encountered many different types of creatures on Finisterre, but the small ones were often too numerous and dangerous to catalogue and were referred to generically as "ghosties" or "spooks".

=== Nighthorses ===
Nighthorses (so-called because of their jet-black coats) are the largest and most intelligent animals the colonists discovered. They are similar in stature to Earth horses, but are omnivorous, have three-toed hooves, are more intelligent than their Earth counterparts and are telepathic. Nighthorses will eat most things they can catch and kill, but failing that, grass and other vegetation.

Cloud's Rider (U.S. hardcover edition). The cover artwork depicts a Nighthorse (Cloud) and his Rider (Danny Fisher).

When humans first arrived on the planet, the wild nighthorses were immediately drawn to them because of the humans' unconscious sendings that were rich in images and emotion. Once a nighthorse has experienced such sendings, it becomes addicted to them and will not leave humans alone. Sifting through these human emotions, a nighthorse will eventually select the human whose sendings it likes best and will adopt him or her as its companion. It will follow this person around, and if he or she is in a village or town, it will remain close to the walls and "call" by flooding the person with images of itself for days and weeks on end until either that person relents and goes to the horse, or withdraws to the centre of the town (if this is possible) where sendings from the Wild generally do not reach.

Those who respond to a nighthorse become riders. Over time, a relationship is formed between the nighthorse and rider: the rider receives transport and protection in the Wild, where a nighthorse defends its rider, while the nighthorse receives shelter in village camps, food, human interaction, and memory assistance. On its own, a nighthorse has a limited memory, but when paired with a rider, the nighthorse is able to recall information.

The role of the nighthorse on Finisterre is pivotal: without them there would be no riders and without riders the human settlements would vanish.

The range of a typical Finisterre creature's sending is "a stone's throw", but a "rogue" can send much further. A rogue is an animal that is sick or injured and pollutes the ambient with images of its distress. A nighthorse can also go rogue when it loses its rider and sends out desperate longings for companionship. Rogue nighthorses are a serious problem to humans on Finisterre because they can send their distress over entire valleys and this often spreads to other creatures like a contagion, making their behaviour unpredictable and dangerous. Humans are not immune to rogue sendings either. Riders and truck drivers have gone over cliff edges because a rogue horse has tricked them into seeing things that are not there. Rogue nighthorses have to be tracked down and destroyed.

=== Riders ===
A rider does not pick a name for the nighthorse that has adopted him. All nighthorses have an image of how they see themselves and that is the image they will respond to. The rider quickly identifies that image and will always use it to communicate with the horse. Danny Fisher referred to his nighthorse as "Cloud" because it saw itself as a cloud drifting peacefully across the sky.

Riders and nighthorses communicate with each other, consciously or unconsciously, by sending images. In the novels Cherryh depicts such "sendings" as text enclosed in "< >". For example, <Cloud running> is an image sent out by Fisher to his nighthorse Cloud persuading him to run. A nighthorse anticipating a snow storm may send <cold, frosty breaths, feet crunching snow> to her rider, who in turn will try to calm her horse by sending an image of <melting drops on green needles, sun shining, road free and clear>.

But riders have to be wary of unconscious sendings. Almost all thoughts, emotions and anxieties a rider experiences are translated into images and sent to the ambient. Nighthorses are easily "spooked" and careless human emotion can be destructive. Riders therefore have to control their emotions in the presence of nighthorses. In addition, nighthorses generally cannot distinguish between past, present and future: they interpret and act on whatever they pickup literally. So a rider recalling an accident that happened last week will be seen by his horse as happening right now and will take evasive action. Riders quickly learn to quieten their minds so as to not excite their horses. Riders have to be particularly careful of rogue nighthorses. Wanting something intently, for example, a rider-shelter in a storm, can be picked by a rogue and sent back to you, making you believe, sometimes to your peril, that a shelter is right in front of you.

Riders don't have complete control over their nighthorses and often have to negotiate with them to get them to do what they want. Riders don't saddle or rein their nighthorses (they will not tolerate that). Instead, when riding, they will hold onto the horse's mane and, when necessary, clench their knees against the horse's sides.

In the Wild a rider is totally dependent on his or her nighthorse for protection against predators and scavengers. Riders quickly learn to trust their horse because the horse always knows the Wild better than even the most experienced rider. Very few animals will approach a nighthorse, and if they do it will broadcast <fierce nighthorse, angry, mayhem> as a warning before attacking. A rider's loyalties are therefore always to his horse first, then his partner, and then his partner's horse.

Riders, of course, cannot read each other's thoughts and emotions directly, but they can indirectly if a nighthorse is present. The "mechanics" of sendings to and from the ambient on Finisterre work as follows:

- Nighthorses and other local fauna send telepathic images to the ambient.
- Humans send non-telepathic images to the ambient.
- Nighthorses and other local fauna can receive both telepathic and non-telepathic images from the ambient.
- Humans can only receive telepathic images from the ambient.

Nighthorses generally relay what they receive from the ambient back to the ambient, giving riders in the vicinity access to what other riders are thinking or feeling. While this is useful as it enables riders to communicate quickly with each other without the need for words, it can be problematic when a rider does not want his feelings to be known to others. Riders quickly learn how to make themselves "invisible" to the ambient by sending images like <wind in the grass, wind bending the stalks, gently waving grass>.

All riders start out as junior riders and their first jobs are often simple tasks like watching over livestock in pastures outside the town walls. Senior riders take on more dangerous assignments in the Wild, such as escorting truck convoys between towns and villages, and protecting road repair crews. Borderers, or border riders, are rider-guides who are born to live in the Wild and only come into the villages and towns during the winter months when the mountain passes are closed.

=== Settlements ===
The colonists explored and settled in a tract of lowland west of an inland sea and up the east face of the Firgeberg, a steep mountain range. Three large towns were established in the lowlands: Shamesey in east, the largest with over 50,000 people; Anveney in the north, an industrial town that refines and processes raw materials; and Malvey in the south, another industrial town that drills for natural gas and oil. Smaller villages and settlements in the highlands, such as Tarmin village, on Tarmin Height, and Evergreen village, halfway up Rogers Peak, were created for mining and logging activities. Evergreen sat at the edge of the known world; the other side of the mountain had never been visited.

Every town and village has a rider camp inside its walls for the riders and their nighthorses. Generally the rider camp sits between the outer walls of the town and the inner walls surrounding the town proper. Large towns like Shamesey split the town proper into an outer ring that borders the rider camp for the workers, and an inner ring for the wealthy merchants. These merchants are thus shielded not only from sendings from the Wild, but also from sendings from the nighthorses in the rider camps. One notable exception is the industrial town of Anveney. It has no rider camp and no protection from riders. The reason for this is that Anveney and the surrounding areas are so polluted that no local fauna venture near it.

During the winter months contact between the towns and villages is limited. The winters on Finisterre are severe with heavy snow falls making the mountain passes impassable. Telephone lines do link the towns and villages, but they are often down due to storm damage. Radio communication is not used except in extreme emergencies as it attracts predators and scavengers.

== See also ==
- List of fictional universes
