= The Collected Short Fiction of C. J. Cherryh =

2004 collection of short fiction by C. J. Cherryh

- The Collected Short Fiction of C. J. Cherryh cover
- Author: C. J. Cherryh
- Cover artist: Michael Whelan
- Language: English
- Genre: Science fiction, fantasy
- Publisher: DAW Books
- Publication date: February 3, 2004
- Publication place: United States
- Media type: Print (hardback & paperback)
- Pages: 656 (hardback)
- ISBN: 0-7564-0217-4
- OCLC: 54090755
- Dewey Decimal: 813/.54 22
- LC Class: PS3553.H358 C65 2004

The Collected Short Fiction of C. J. Cherryh is a collection of science fiction and fantasy short stories, novelettes and novella written by American author C. J. Cherryh between 1977 and 2004. It was first published by DAW Books in 2004. This collection includes the contents of two previous Cherryh collections, Sunfall (1981) and Visible Light (1986), all of the stories from Glass and Amber (1987), stories originally published in other collections and magazines, and one story written specifically for this collection ("MasKs"). Cherryh's 1978 Hugo Award winning story "Cassandra" is also included.

The Collected Short Fiction of C. J. Cherryh was voted the second best collection in the 2005 Locus Awards.

== Background ==
Cherryh is best known for her science fiction and fantasy novels. Short story writing is an art she never considered until she had several novels published. The compactness and limited characterisation of the short story form did not lend itself well to Cherryh's precise and complex novel construction.

In spite of this, she has proved herself quite capable of working in this medium and this collection as a whole has been well received by critics. "Cassandra" won her a Hugo Award, was nominated for the Nebula Award for Best Short Story and the Locus Award for best short story, and in 1999 was named as one of Locus magazine's 50 best science fiction short stories of all time. "A Thief in Korianth" won the 1982 Balrog Award for best short fiction, "The Scapegoat" was nominated for the Hugo Award for Best Novella and "Gwydion and the Dragon" was nominated for the World Fantasy Award for Best Novella. While novels are still her preferred medium, she does enjoy the chance to write short stories, doing so mostly when requested or between other works when a given idea does not lend itself to a novel.

The collection contains almost all the short stories she had published through 2004, with the exception of those published in the various shared world anthologies to which she has contributed.

== Contents ==
This collection is divided into three sections: Sunfall (stories from Cherryh's Sunfall collection plus a new story, "MasKs"), Visible Light (stories from Cherryh's Visible Light collection) and Other Stories (stories from other collections and magazines). The story titles, showing where and when they were originally published, follow.

=== Sunfall ===
- "Prologue" (Sunfall, C. J. Cherryh, 1981)
- "The Only Death in the City (Paris)" – short story (Sunfall, C. J. Cherryh, 1981)
- "The Haunted Tower (London)" – novelette (Sunfall, C. J. Cherryh, 1981)
- "Ice (Moscow)" – novelette (Sunfall, C. J. Cherryh, 1981)
- "Nightgame (Rome)" – short story (Sunfall, C. J. Cherryh, 1981)
- "Highliner (New York)" – novelette (Sunfall, C. J. Cherryh, 1981)
- "The General (Peking)" – novelette (Sunfall, C. J. Cherryh, 1981)
- "MasKs (Venice)" – novelette (2004)

=== Visible Light ===
- "Frontispiece" (Visible Light, C. J. Cherryh, 1986)
- "Cassandra" – short story (The Magazine of Fantasy & Science Fiction, October 1978)
- "Threads of Time" – short story (Darkover Grand Council Program Book IV, 1981)
- "Companions" – novella (John W. Campbell Memorial Awards Vol V, ed. George R. R. Martin, 1984)
- "A Thief in Korianth" – novelette (Flashing Swords! No 5: Demons and Daggers, ed. Lin Carter, 1981)
- "The Last Tower" – short story (Sorcerer’s Apprentice, Winter 1982)
- "The Brothers" – novella (Visible Light, C. J. Cherryh, 1986)
- "Endpiece" (Visible Light, C. J. Cherryh, 1986)

=== Other stories ===
- "The Dark King" – short story (The Year’s Best Fantasy Stories 3, ed. Lin Carter, 1977)
- "Homecoming" – short story (Shayol, Summer 1979)
- "The Dreamstone" – short story (Amazons!, ed. Jessica Amanda Salmonson, 1979)
- "Sea Change" – short story (Elsewhere, ed. Terri Winding & Mark Alan Arnold, 1981)
- "Willow" – novelette (Hecate’s Cauldron, ed. Susan Shwartz, 1982)
- "Of Law and Magic" – novelette (Moonsinger’s Friends, ed. Susan Shwartz, 1985)
- "The Unshadowed Land" – short story (Sword and Sorceress II, ed. Marion Zimmer Bradley, 1985)
- "Pots" – novelette (Afterwar, ed. Janet Morris, 1985)
- "The Scapegoat" – novella (Alien Stars, ed. Betsy Mitchell, 1985)
- "A Gift of Prophecy" – short story (Glass and Amber, 1987)
- "Wings" – short story (Carmen Miranda’s Ghost Is Haunting Space Station Three, ed. Don Sakers, 1989)
- "A Much Briefer History of Time" – short story (Drabble II: Double Century, ed. Rob Meades & David B. Wake, 1990)
- "Gwydion and the Dragon" – novelette (Once Upon a Time, ed. Lester del Rey & Risa Kessler, 1991)
- "Mech" – short story (FutureCrime, ed. Cynthia Manson & Charles Ardai, 1992)
- "The Sandman, the Tinman, and the BettyB" – novelette (DAW 30th Anniversary: Science Fiction, ed. Elizabeth R. Wollheim & Sheila E. Gilbert, 2002)

== Story plots ==
The stories in this collection cover a broad range of genres from science fiction and space opera through to fantasy and magic.

Sunfall is a collection of stories set in the far future on an ancient Earth under a dying Sun that is emitting dangerous levels of radiation. Each story deals with a city and how it has evolved to cope with the fading Sun. Paris and New York City have become single self-contained structures with no "outside". In "The Only Death in the City (Paris)" this closed biosphere has resulted in no "new births": everyone who dies is reincarnated again in the city with all the memories of their previous lives. In "Nightgame (Rome)" the nobles wile away their boredom by dreaming dreams captured from less fortunates using an apparatus no one knows the origin of.

"Cassandra" is a story of a woman cursed with the ability to simultaneously experience the present and the near future. "The Threads of Time" revisits the Gates in Cherryh's 1976 novel Gate of Ivrel. "Companions" is a novella about a ship stranded on a planet with Warren, the sole survivor, and Anne, a computer whose job it is to "protect" him (not unlike HAL in 2001: A Space Odyssey). "The Last Tower" is set on the edge of the land of faery where an old man lives in an old tower, the last bastion of magic against the onslaught of the Empire of Men from the East. In "The Brothers", Caith is damned by faeries for committing patricide and is cursed with Dubhain, a shapeshifting phooka, as his perpetual companion. Caith and Dubhain continue their journey in Cherryh's 1994 novel Faery in Shadow.

"Willow" deals with temptation and lust, and concerns a knight returning home from a ten-year war who has his battle-hardened indifference and contempt changed by a beautiful women and her daughter. "Mech" looks at high-tech policing in the future. Two of the stories are set in Cherryh's Alliance-Union universe: "The Sandman, the Tinman, and the BettyB" takes place in the vicinity of Pell Station and concerns the crew of space prospectors and miners and their encounter with an inert rogue missile fired by an unknown warship in a decades-ago war; "The Scapegoat" sees an unusual truce formed between the Union, the Alliance and Earth to deal with the Elves, a technologically inferior alien race that insists on launching suicide attacks on any human ship in sight.

== Excluded short fiction ==
Although it contains the majority of Cherryh's other short fiction published as of 2004, the collection is not fully comprehensive as it excludes most of her work published in the various shared world anthologies to which she has contributed. Short fiction by Cherryh not part of this anthology includes:

=== Thieves World ===
- "Ischade" in Shadows of Sanctuary – Thieves World #3, 1981
- "Downwind" in Storm Season – Thieves World #4, 1982
- "Necromant" in The Face of Chaos – Thieves World #5, 1983
- "Witching Hour" in Wings of Omen – Thieves World #6, 1984
- "Armies of the Night" in The Dead of Winter – Thieves World #7, 1985
- "Dagger in the Mind" in Soul of the City – Thieves World #8, 1986
- "Death in the Meadow" in Soul of the City – Thieves World #8, 1986
- "In the Still of the Night" in Blood Ties – Thieves World #9, 1986
- "The Best of Friends" in Uneasy Alliances – Thieves World #11, 1988
- "Winds of Fortune" in Stealer's Sky – Thieves World #12, 1990

=== Heroes in Hell ===
- "Basileus" (with Janet Morris) in Heroes in Hell, 1986
- "The Prince" in Heroes in Hell, 1986
- "Marking Time" in Rebels in Hell, 1986
- "Monday Morning" in Rebels in Hell, 1986
- "Sharper than a Serpent's Tooth" in Crusaders in Hell, 1987
- "The Conscience of the King" (with Nancy Asire) in Angels in Hell, 1987
- "Passages" in Masters in Hell, 1987
- "Rook's Move" in War in Hell, 1988
- "The Sibylline Affair" in Prophets in Hell, 1989

=== Merovingen Nights ===
- "Festival Moon" in Festival Moon – Merovingen Nights #1, 1987
- "Fever Season" in Fever Season – Merovingen Nights #2, 1987
- "Troubled Waters" in Troubled Waters – Merovingen Nights #3, 1988.
- "Smuggler's Gold" in Smuggler's Gold – Merovingen Nights #4, 1988.
- "Seeds of Destruction" in Divine Right – Merovingen Nights #5, 1989
- "Flood Tide" in Flood Tide – Merovingen Nights #6, 1990
- "Endgame" in Endgame – Merovingen Nights #7, 1991

=== Elfquest ===
- "Swift-Spear" (with Mark C. Perry) in The Blood of the Ten Chiefs, 1986
- "The Search" (with Christine Dewees) in Wolfsong (The Blood of Ten Chiefs Vol. 2), 1988

=== Other works ===
- "To Take a Thief" in Magic in Ithkar, 1985
- "Stormbirds" in Four from the Witch World – Tales of the Witch World, 1989
- "Pot of Dreams" (with Jane S. Fancher) in Marion Zimmer Bradley's Fantasy Magazine, March 1995
- "Cold Sleep" in Infinite Stars: Dark Frontiers: The Definitive Anthology of Space Opera, editor Bryan Thomas Schmidt, 2019

== Cover art ==
The cover art, by Michael Whelan, originally appeared on the cover of Sunfall, Cherryh's 1981 book of short stories included in this collection, but as a mirror image of the artwork used for the new collection. On the original Sunfall cover, in other words, the figures depicted in the artwork face to the left, not to the right (see image). The artwork illustrates the Sunfall short story "Nightgame (Rome)".
