= Gene Wars =

Gene Wars may refer to:

- The Gene Wars universe, a science fiction and fantasy universe developed by C. J. Cherryh
- The science fiction short story "Gene Wars" by Paul J. McAuley
- Genewars, a Bullfrog Productions strategy game from 1996
- Ethnic bioweapon, a weapon that harms people having certain genes
