= Visible light (disambiguation) =

Visible light may refer to light, or to:

- The visible spectrum
- Sunlight
- A work included in The Collected Short Fiction of C. J. Cherryh
