= Brothers of Earth =

1976 science fiction novel by C. J. Cherryh

- First edition
- Author: C. J. Cherryh
- Cover artist: D. K. Stone
- Language: English
- Genre: Science fiction
- Publisher: Nelson Doubleday
- Publication date: June 1976
- Publication place: United States
- Media type: Print (hardback & paperback)
- ISBN: 0-88677-290-7
- OCLC: 29659729

Brothers of Earth is a 1976 science fiction novel by American writer C. J. Cherryh. It was the second of Cherryh's novels to be published, appearing after Gate of Ivrel, although she had completed and submitted Brothers of Earth first. Donald A. Wollheim, the editor of DAW Books, decided that publishing Gate of Ivrel first would be more commercially desirable, so Brothers of Earth was delayed until the former was released.

The book was first published as a hardcover Science Fiction Book Club edition in June, 1976 and followed by the first DAW paperback edition in October of that year. In 2003, DAW re-released the book in an omnibus edition along with Cherryh's 1977 novel Hunter of Worlds. The omnibus edition was entitled At the Edge of Space.

As with Gate of Ivrel and its sequels, Brothers of Earth is set in Cherryh's Alliance-Union universe; however, these novels describe events distant from and largely unrelated to her many subsequent works in that timeline. The book was ranked 10th on the 1977 Locus Award for Best Novel.

== Plot ==
The protagonist of the book is Kurt Morgan, a crewman on the Alliance ship Endymion, which was destroyed in a space battle with Hanan forces. Morgan evacuates the ship and lands on an alien planet, home of the Nemet race. Morgan is rescued by one faction of the Nemet and becomes embroiled in their political and military struggles. Morgan is not the first human stranded on the planet, however. His encounters with a previous female human castaway endanger the entire Nemet race when she reacts badly and threatens to unleash weapons of mass destruction on the planet.

== Works cited ==
- Cherryh, C. J. Brothers of Earth, DAW Books, 1976. ISBN 0886772907.
- Cherryh, C. J. Hunter of Worlds, DAW Books, 1977.
- Cherryh, C. J. At the Edge of Space, DAW Books, 2003. Omnibus.
