= Glass and Amber =

1987 collection of short stories and essays by C.J. Cherryh

- Cover art by Barclay Shaw, a modified version of the cover he did for Cherryh's 1984 novel Voyager in Night with images of a space station and Cherryh added
- Author: C. J. Cherryh
- Cover artist: Barclay Shaw
- Language: English
- Genre: Science fiction short stories
- Publisher: NESFA Press
- Publication date: February 1987
- Publication place: United States
- Media type: Print (paperback)
- ISBN: 0-915368-34-X
- OCLC: 16144669

Glass and Amber is a 1987 collection of short stories and essays by American science fiction and fantasy author C. J. Cherryh. The book was published by NESFA Press to commemorate Cherryh’s appearance as the guest of honor at Boskone 24, a science fiction convention. Only 1,000 copies were printed, and each is individually numbered on the copyright page. The first 250 numbered copies were autographed by Cherryh and sold in slipcases. Some of these were also signed by Barclay Shaw, the cover artist.

== Contents ==
The following stories and essays are included:

- "Of Law and Magic" is story about a wizardous lawyer, a desperate witch, and the laws of magic which entangle them. This story provides an unusual perspective on magic.
- "Homecoming" tells of an unmanned deep space probe, its discovery of alien life, and its journey home. It provides unique insight into the mechanical mind.
- "Romantic / Science Fiction" is an essay which traces the roots of science fiction to the old tradition of romantic literature.
- "The Dark King" is a compassionate retelling of the Sisyphus and Hades story.
- "Perspectives in SF" is a humorous essay on the place of science fiction in our society. In it Cherryh describes her early indoctrination into science fiction and discusses directions for science fiction in the future.
- "Sea Change" is a dark tale of the sea: one girl, two boys, and the nature of luck.
- "The Avoidance Factor" discusses the possibility of extraterrestrial life, and why we haven't found it.
- "A Gift of Prophecy" is a somewhat disturbing story of an oracular priestess set in the future.
- "The Use of Archaeology in Worldbuilding" illuminates Cherryh's science fiction, and will interest serious fans.
- "Willow" is a story of a disillusioned knight in an encounter with a maiden, a mother, and a crone.
- "In Alien Tongues" is an essay outlining the construction of alien languages central to the realism of Cherryh's worlds.
- "Pots" is the final and most enigmatic story in the collection, telling of the discovery of an abandoned planet (Earth?) by archaeologists seeking their own roots.

All of the works in the book had been previously published except "The Avoidance Factor" and "Pots", which are original to this volume. This is the first English-language printing of "A Gift of Prophecy", which had previously been published only in Dutch.

All of the stories in this collection were later reprinted in The Collected Short Fiction of C. J. Cherryh (2004).

== Reception ==
Glass and Amber was reviewed by Doug Fratz in Thrust, Summer 1987.
