= Rider at the Gate =

1995 novel by C. J. Cherryh

- First edition cover
- Author: C. J. Cherryh
- Cover artist: Ciruelo Cabral
- Language: English
- Genre: Science fiction
- Publisher: Warner Books
- Publication date: August 1995
- Publication place: United States
- Pages: 437 (hardback)
- ISBN: 0-446-51781-X
- OCLC: 32167685
- Dewey Decimal: 813/.54 20
- LC Class: PS3553.H358 R53 1995
- Preceded by: –
- Followed by: Cloud's Rider (1996)

Rider at the Gate is a science fiction novel by American writer C. J. Cherryh, first published by Warner Books in August 1995. It is the first of a series of two novels written by Cherryh and is set in the author's Finisterre universe. The second book in the series, Cloud's Rider, was published in September 1996. The series is about the descendants of lost colonists stranded many generations ago on the hostile planet of Finisterre.

== Plot summary ==
Three riders arrive at the Shamesey town gates to inform border rider Guil Stuart that his partner, Aby Dale and her nighthorse Moon, were killed in a truck convoy accident on Tarmin Height. The accident, they say, was caused by a rogue nighthorse. Stuart heads up the mountain to hunt down and kill the rogue. Danny Fisher, a junior rider and friend of Stuart, follows him. Another rider, Ancel Harper, who blames Stuart for the earlier death of his brother, also pursues Stuart. With winter approaching, journeys up the mountain at this time of the year are ill-advised and dangerous.

Stuart first goes to the industrial town of Anveney where he meets businessman Lew Cassivey. Dale had been working for Cassivey, and her last job, escorting the truck convoy down the mountain, included delivering a shipment of gold to him. The truck that crashed had the gold in it, and Cassivey wants Stuart to retrieve it and pays him in advance.

In Tarmin village, in the highlands near Tarmin Height, 13-year-old Brionne Goss responds to the <call> of a nighthorse in the Wild by going out the village gates on her own. It is a rogue nighthorse and it finds and adopts Brionne. During her absence, riders go out looking for her, and her older brothers, Carlo and Randy, are arrested in the village for the death of their father, the blacksmith. Their father had belittled and abused the boys for most of their lives and when he now accuses them of pushing Brionne out the gate, Carlo shoots him. Later Brionne and the rogue return to the village and her mother insists that the gates be opened to let her daughter in. Tarmin is then overrun by swarms of predators and scavengers and everyone in the village is killed, except for Tara Chang, a rider out of the village at the time, and the Goss brothers who are locked in jail.

Fisher arrives at Tarmin to find the gates wide open! The village is decimated, but Fisher finds and frees the Goss brothers. Stuart reaches Tarmin's gates (now closed) where he is shot at by Harper who is waiting near the gates to ambush him. Stuart retreats to a rider shelter and is later joined by Chang who is lost after the fall of Tarmin. Then the rogue with Brionne on its back arrives at the shelter. The rogue, whom Stuart recognises as Dale's horse Moon, has found Stuart in the ambient, recognising him as Dale's partner. Stuart tricks Moon by approaching her as a friend and then shoots the horse dead. He rescues Brionne, but the loss of "her nighthorse" causes her to slip into a coma.

Stuart realises that Moon could not have died with Dale and went rogue only after her rider fell off the cliff. Moon must have sent images to the ambient of Moon and Dale together in the gorge below because that is what Moon would have wanted. What the other riders saw and reported were Moon's sendings.

Then Harper arrives at the shelter and shoots and wounds Stuart. Chang responds by shooting and killing Harper, and Harper's nighthorse runs away, riderless and another potential rogue. Fisher and the Goss boys leave Tarmin village to search for Stuart and find him at the shelter. Because of the danger Brionne now poses if she wakes up with another rogue in the vicinity, Fisher agrees to escort her and her brothers to another village further up the mountain. Stuart and Chang remain behind in the rider shelter because Stuart cannot ride and needs to recover from his injury.

== Main characters ==
=== Humans ===
- Danny Fisher – junior rider from Shamesey town, 17-years old
- Guil Stuart – border rider working out of Malvey town
- Aby Dale – senior rider and Stuart's partner
- Ancel Harper – senior rider
- Lew Cassivey – businessman in Anveney town
- Tara Chang – senior rider from Tarmin village
- Brionne Goss – Tarmin village blacksmith's daughter, 13-years old
- Carlo Goss – Tarmin village blacksmith's son, 16-years old
- Randy Goss – Tarmin village blacksmith's son, 14-years old

=== Nighthorses ===
- Cloud – Danny Fisher's young horse
- Burn – Guil Stuart's horse
- Flicker – Tara Chang's horse
- Moon – Aby Dale's horse
- Spook – Ancel Harper's horse (Note: Spook is only a nickname, Harper never revealed the name of his horse.)

== See also ==
- List of fictional universes
