= Lois & Clark: A Superman Novel =

1996 novel by C. J. Cherryh

- Prima Publishing hardcover first edition, 1996
- Author: C. J. Cherryh
- Language: English
- Genre: Superhero fiction
- Published: August 27, 1996 (Prima Publishing)
- Publication place: United States
- Media type: Print (hardback & paperback)
- Pages: 288 pp (hardback)
- ISBN: 978-0761504825

Lois & Clark: A Superman Novel is a superhero fiction novel by American science fiction and fantasy writer C. J. Cherryh. It is based on the television series Lois & Clark: The New Adventures of Superman and is about the romance between Superman universe characters Lois Lane and Clark Kent.

The book was first published in hardback in August 1996 by Prima Publishing in the United States, and in October 1996 by Boxtree Ltd in the United Kingdom. Paperback editions of the novel were published in the US in August 1997 by Prima, and in the UK (as Lois & Clark: The New Adventures of Superman) in October 1997 by Boxtree. The book was translated into German and published in Germany in 1997 as Lois & Clark: Der Superman Roman by Heyne Verlag, an imprint of Random House publishers.

== Plot summary ==
Lois Lane and Clark Kent's engagement in Metropolis is interrupted when Clark/Superman has to fly to the Caucasus in Eurasia to rescue people downstream from a burst dam. While Clark is away, a hotel in Metropolis collapses, and Lois becomes involved in rescuing some children. When Clark returns, he and Lois discover that their arch-rival Lex Luthor may be responsible for bringing down the hotel and other buildings the city using water to undermine their foundations.

== Reception ==
In a review of Lois & Clark in the New Straits Times, Martin Spice criticised the book's lacklustre plot and elements of it that are not believable, for example buildings in Metropolis that have their foundations washed away by water. He was also critical of the book's publishers and their copyediting, and in particular the cover's public display of affection between Lois and Clark, which, he felt is not in keeping with Superman's image. He asked, "whatever did [Superman] do to deserve a cover like this?" Spice called Lois & Clark "a hack volume" that was "probably produced in a hurry". He believed that "Cherryh's heart was [not] quite in this one", but added that she does "produce a hack novel worthy of the name".

Lois & Clark was also reviewed by Neil Jones in July 1998 issue of the British fantasy and science fiction magazine, Interzone, and by Jill M. Smith in RT Book Reviews. Smith wrote that "Cherryh uses her vast talents to add to the adventures of two timeless, beloved characters".

== Works cited ==
- Cherryh, C. J. (1997). Lois & Clark: A Superman Novel. Prima Publishing.
