= Hunter of Worlds =

1977 novel by C. J. Cherryh

- Science Fiction Book Club first edition
- Author: C. J. Cherryh
- Cover artist: Chet Jezierski
- Language: English
- Genre: Science fiction
- Publisher: Nelson Doubleday
- Publication date: 1977
- Publication place: United States
- Media type: Print (hardback & paperback)
- Pages: 214 pp (hardback), 256 pp (paperback)
- ISBN: 0-87997-314-5

Hunter of Worlds is a 1977 science fiction novel by American writer C. J. Cherryh. It was published by DAW Books, first as a Science Fiction Book Club selection through Nelson Doubleday in March 1977 and then in a DAW paperback edition in August of that year. The work is set in Cherryh's Alliance-Union universe and occurs in the far future during the period of the Hanan Revolution, although the events portrayed in the novel take place in another sector of the galaxy.

Hunter of Worlds was ranked 12th on the 1978 Locus Award for Best Novel. In 2003, DAW re-released the book in an omnibus edition, At the Edge of Space along with Cherryh's 1976 novel Brothers of Earth.

== Plot introduction ==
In the story, a ship belonging to a terrifyingly dominant space-faring race, the iduve, arrives at a space station. They demand that a particular station resident, a blue-skinned Kallian, be sent to their ship and all record of him be erased. No defiance is possible or the space station will be destroyed. The human-like Kallian is handed over to the iduve who mind-link him to a female Kallian in their service and, later, to a human prisoner, forcing him to service his captors on three levels.

== Reception ==
Translator and poet Burton Raffel wrote in an essay "C.J. Cherryh's Fiction" that he was impressed that Hunter of Worlds "explores not only multiple-levels of species relationships, but species differences of an extraordinary nature". The story is told from an alien viewpoint and vocabulary, and The Routledge Companion to Science Fiction notes the emphasis in the book on language. The iduve language makes "no clear distinction between the concepts of noun and verb, between solid and action". The Encyclopedia of Fictional and Fantastic Languages describes three of the languages present in Hunter of Worlds, namely the kalliran, amaut and iduve languages, but felt that the "dense use of alien terminology" does tend to make the prose difficult to follow at times, despite the "Glossary of Foreign Terms" at the back of the book.

Some of the alien vocabulary represents concepts that are not easily represented as single words in English:

- vaikka – revenge, but not in the usual English sense;
- takkhenes – a kind of shared consciousness;
- arastiethe – the area you are responsible for or in control of.

== Reviews ==
- del Rey, Lester (August 1977). "Review of Hunter of Worlds". Analog Science Fiction and Fact. 97 (8): 172–174.
- Smith, Brian (October 1980). "Review of Hunter of Worlds". Vector. 99: 21.
