= Serpent's Reach =

1980 science fiction novel by C. J. Cherryh

- Serpent's Reach first edition cover, depicts Raen a Sul hant Meth-maren, and a Majat
- Author: C. J. Cherryh
- Cover artist: Ken Barr
- Language: English
- Genre: Science fiction
- Publisher: Nelson Doubleday
- Publication date: May 1980
- Publication place: United States
- Media type: Print (Hardback & Paperback)
- Pages: 312 (hardcover edition)
- ISBN: 0-88677-088-2

Serpent's Reach is a 1980 science fiction novel by American writer C. J. Cherryh. The book was nominated for the Locus Award for Best Novel in 1981. It is set in the author's Alliance–Union universe.

Specific placement of the novel within the Alliance–Union timeline is difficult because two of Cherryh's works provide contradictory dates. The events in the novel most likely begin in the year 3141 (see "Timeline issues" below).

The work was first published as a Science Fiction Book Club edition through Nelson Doubleday in May 1980, followed by a DAW Books paperback edition in August of that year.

== Background ==
The book is set in the constellation Hydrus, which is known in the Alliance–Union universe as the "Hydri Reach", and also as "Serpent's Reach", from which the book takes its title. The Hydri stars are home to the alien Majat, an insectoid race with a hive-mind consciousness. Like some species of Earth insects, the Majat are eusocial, featuring separate Drone, Worker and Warrior castes that serve each hive's single Queen. There are only four distinct hive-mind identities in the Majat species which were arbitrarily assigned colors by the humans: blue and green (the "tame" hives), and red and gold (the "wild" hives). They are native to Cerdin, a planet in the Alpha Hydri system (but see "Majat planet of origin" below).

The entire constellation is under strict quarantine due to the dangers inherent in human-Majat interaction. The first contact with the Majat, for example, resulted in the human delegation being eaten. Humans do live in the Hydri stars, however, because Union had established colonies there before ceding Serpent's Reach to the Alliance, which subsequently imposed the quarantine. A space station orbiting the planet Beta Hydri II, called Istra, serves as the sole point of contact between the Alliance and the human/Majat society of the Hydri stars.

The human segment of that society is structured into three tiers. The top tier is the Kontrin Company, or Family, comprising 27 Houses with 58 Septs within the Houses. These aristocrats rule the system and direct relations with the Majat. They are also "immortal" in the sense that they do not die of natural causes, although they can be killed. This immortality was a gift from the Majat who could not come to terms with the concept of "minds-that-died".

The second tier of humans, referred to as Betas, are "normal" humans that were initially created by the Kontrin from human eggs, programmed to be loyal to the Kontrin, and then allowed to breed amongst themselves. Cherryh's Azi race of human clones make up the third tier, acting as servants or slaves to the Kontrin, the Betas and also the Majat. Although it is primarily an "Alliance-side" novel (not Union), the story nevertheless features Azi because Union settlers originally colonized the Hydri stars.

== Plot summary ==
The novel begins on a Family estate at Kethiuy on Cerdin, where the Sul sept of the Meth-maren House is attacked by the rival Ruil sept, with the help of Red and Gold Majats. The Ruil sept is seeking to wrest control of the Blue Majat from the Sul sept. A young Raen a Sul hant Meth-maren is the only survivor, and she seeks refuge in the nearby Blue Majat Hive. There she persuades the Blue Queen to help her regain control of Kethiuy. The Blue Warriors and their azi succeed in destroying the Ruil sept, but the Blue Hive is decimated and Raen is captured and brought before the Kontrin Council. Moth, the second oldest Kontrin, protects Raen from the Kontrin conspirators seeking to destroy her, and Raen is banished from Cerdin.

Raen adopts a low profile and drifts from planet to planet in the Reach. She survives several assassination attempts but never gives up her desire for revenge against the Kontrin Council and those who destroyed her family. After Council Eldest Lian is assassinated, Moth takes control of the Council. She watches Raen's movement but does not interfere. Raen's final move is to board a Beta passenger spaceliner, Andra's Jewel bound for Istra, the only planet in the Reach accessible from the Outside. Istra has no permanent Kontrin presence, only Betas, who deal with Outsiders and the Majat, who were brought here by the Kontrin hundreds of years previously. To amuse herself on Andra's Jewel's long voyage, Raen plays Sej, a dicing game, every night with a ship azi named Jim. They agree that at the end of the voyage Raen will buy his contract, and if Jim is the overall winner, he will be a free man, but if he loses, he will become her azi. Jim narrowly loses and serves her for the remainder of the story.

On Istra, Raen and Jim, now her second in command, establish a presence on the planet. She manipulates the Betas and gains control of their affairs. She also allies herself with the local Blue Majat Hive. But the Majat Hives are restless and soon turn on each other. The Blue, Green and Red Queens are killed and the surviving Gold Queen unites all the Hives under her. The Hive revolt spreads to all planets of the Reach and all the Kontrin perish, except for Raen, who now lives with the Majat on Istra. With the Kontrin Company no longer in control, the Betas take charge of the Reach. All the azi are gone, having self-terminated at their maximum age of 40, and no new azi are created. Jim, however, at Raen's request, is given immortality by the Majat and lives with her in the Gold Hive.

== Main characters ==
- Raen a Sul hant Meth-maren (human female): Kontrin of the Sul sept of the Meth-maren House
- Jim: Raen's Azi
- Lian: Kontrin Council Eldest and leader
- Moth: Kontrin Council Elder

== Sej ==
Sej is a dice game of part chance and part skill for two players. Cherryh describes the game in detail in an appendix to her novel.

Sej is played with two six-sided dice and three four-sided wands with symbols and colors on each wand face. The players alternately play hands, which involves casting the wands; both players then roll the dice for possession of the points represented by the wands cast. The skill of the game is in deciding whether to risk playing the hand cast or to pass it. The game is won by accumulating 100 points.

== Timeline issues ==
Placing the book within Cherryh's overall Alliance–Union timeline is somewhat challenging because the dates cited in Serpent's Reach (published in 1980) contradict those given in a timeline Cherryh later presented in Angel with the Sword (published in 1985). Specifically, Serpent's Reach indicates that first contact with the Majat occurs in 2223. Angel with the Sword, however, provides a date of 2623 for first contact, 400 years later.

It is very probable that the Angel with the Sword reference is correct and the earlier Serpent's Reach date is incorrect, because:

1. The citation in Serpent's Reach that provides the earlier date is from an Alliance government document, but the validity of this citation is highly dubious:
  - The document itself is dated 2301. But the Merchanter's Alliance was not created until after 2353, so a document referencing "Alliance citizens", "Alliance law", and so forth could not exist in 2301.
  - The document refers to "several centuries" of combined human/Majat government of the Hydri stars, which directly contradicts the document's own citation of first contact only 77 years before.
2. Union first contact and subsequent colonization does not make sense beginning in 2223, but does fit well with Cherryh's timeline in 2623:
  - Faster-than-light space travel is not invented in Cherryh's timeline until 2234, making colonization of the remote Hydri reach by anyone unlikely prior to that date.
  - In the Alliance–Union timeline, Union itself was not formed until 2300, so it is not possible for Union to have begun colonizing the Hydri stars some 70 years before.
  - Union began an aggressive colonization drive after the erosion of the Gehenna Doctrine in 2600, so a 2623 date is quite sensible for a Union first contact with the Majat.
3. The Alliance–Union timeline on Cherryh's official Web site, which covers the period of 2005–2300, makes no reference of the 2223 contact, and in fact no reference at all to the Majat or the Hydri stars.

The reason for the discrepancy is unclear. It is possible that the publisher mis-transcribed the dates from Cherryh's manuscript for Serpent's Reach. It is perhaps more likely that after having the opportunity to more fully develop her future history for the universe, Cherryh simply revised the dates in 1985 as a retcon.

In any case, assuming the Angel with the Sword reference is correct (and that Serpent's Reach therefore dates itself inaccurately), the events in the novel begin in the year 3141, some 400 years after the conclusion of the Mri Wars, and 518 years after first contact with the Majat.

=== Majat planet of origin ===
Another discrepancy between the two books is the location of the Majat planet of origin, Cerdin, within the Alpha Hydri system. Serpent's Reach states that Cerdin is the third satellite of Alpha Hydri (i.e. Alpha Hydri III), but Angel with the Sword states that the Majat originated on Alpha Hydri II. There is no specific evidence presented in either book to help determine which is correct. Because the Serpent's Reach citation is from the same dubious document noted above, and under the assumption that the Angel with the Sword timeline is designed to function in part as a retcon, some readers may conclude that the correct listing for Cerdin is Alpha Hydri II. Others may decide that the original reference in Serpent's Reach is correct.

== Works ==
- Cherryh, C. J. Angel with the Sword, DAW Books, 1985.
- Cherryh, C. J. The Deep Beyond (omnibus), DAW Books, 1985.
- Cherryh, C. J. Serpent's Reach, DAW Books, 1980.
