= Exile's Gate =

1988 novel by C. J. Cherryh

- Exile's Gate
- Author: C. J. Cherryh
- Cover artist: Michael Whelan
- Language: English
- Series: The Morgaine Stories
- Genre: Fantasy
- Publisher: DAW Books
- Publication date: January 1988
- Publication place: United States
- Media type: Print (Paperback)
- Pages: 414
- ISBN: 0-88677-254-0
- OCLC: 17010858
- LC Class: CPB Box no. 1731 vol. 10
- Preceded by: Fires of Azeroth (1979)

Exile's Gate is a 1988 fantasy novel by American writer C. J. Cherryh. It is the fourth of four books comprising The Morgaine Stories, chronicling the deeds of Morgaine, a woman consumed by a mission of the utmost importance, and her chance-met companion, Nhi Vanye i Chya.

== Plot summary ==
Morgaine faces her greatest challenge in Gault, a human-alien figure who seeks to control the world and its Gate. She also encounters the true Gatemaster, a mysterious lord whose power is equal to, or greater than, her own.
