= Cloud's Rider =

1996 novel by C. J. Cherryh

- US paperback edition cover
- Author: C. J. Cherryh
- Cover artist: Mike Posen
- Language: English
- Genre: Science fiction
- Publisher: Warner Books
- Publication date: September 1996
- Publication place: United States
- Pages: 373 (hardback)
- ISBN: 0-446-51910-3
- OCLC: 34113219
- Dewey Decimal: 813/.54 20
- LC Class: PS3553.H358 C57 1996
- Preceded by: Rider at the Gate (1995)
- Followed by: –

Cloud's Rider is a science fiction novel written by American writer C. J. Cherryh, first published by Warner Books in September 1996. It is the second of a series of two novels written by Cherryh and is set in the author's Finisterre universe. The first book in the series, Rider at the Gate was published in August 1995. The series is about the descendants of lost colonists stranded many generations ago on the hostile planet of Finisterre.

== Plot summary ==
Fisher and Cloud escort the Goss children halfway up Rogers Peak to Evergreen village with Harper's riderless nighthorse, Spook, in pursuit. Fisher tells the local riders about the fall of Tarmin village and the presence of Spook, but does not reveal the arrest of the Goss brothers nor the role Brionne played in Tarmin's demise. Fisher is lodged in the rider camp, the unconscious Brionne with Darcey Schaffer, the village doctor, and Carlo and Randy with Van Mackey, the village blacksmith. The news of Tarmin's fall is devastating to Evergreen because all its supplies come from there, but many of the villagers see the disaster as an opportunity to seize and occupy the vacant property in Tarmin village in the spring.

One night Spook enters the ambient and disturbs the horses and riders in the rider camp. Fisher knows that Brionne has woken up and is <calling>. The next morning Ridley takes Fisher out the gates to find Spook, but when they are some distance from the village, Ridley points his rifle at Fisher and demands the truth. Fisher is relieved to be able to finally unburden himself and tells Ridley everything he knows.

Earnest Rigs, a miner, arrives at the doctor's house for treatment and sees and is entranced by Brionne. That night Schaffer and Brionne are awoken by a noise on the roof and a banging at the door. The next day, Schaffer finds blood splattered outside her house, and Rigs is missing. A crowd gathers, including the Goss boys and the village marshal. Carlo is accused of murdering Rigs and, scared that his arrest in Tarmin will become known, runs away. The marshal orders that Carlo be stopped, and a group of miners pursue him. When Carlo reaches the village gate, his only escape is out the village.

Spook finds Carlo in the Wild and immediately adopts him. Fisher and Cloud begin searching for Carlo and see him riding Spook. Suspecting that Spook may have gone rogue, Fisher pursues them. When he catches up with them he sees a threatening shadow in the trees above them and shoots it. At the same time, Stuart and Chang, out looking for Fisher and the Goss children, find Fisher and Carlo. They search for the creature Fisher shot but find instead a large nest in which appear to be human bones. No creature of this size and ability had ever been encountered before, and they conclude that it must have come from the unexplored side of the mountain, probably attracted by the noise in the ambient from the swarm that overran Tarmin. Then the riders hear Evergreen's bells calling for help, and set off for the village.

At Evergreen, the breakthrough bells are ringing and the riders enter the village to investigate. They find the gate man ripped to shreds in his watch tower and track the intruder to the houses. When the riders hear Brionne <calling> they realise that she is controlling the beast. They go to Schaffer's house where, through the door, they try to persuade the doctor to drug the girl. Inside Brionne opens the underground passage door to reveal a huge ape-like creature. It picks up Brionne and when Schaffer tries to intervene, it hurls the doctor against the wall, killing her. Like a rider and a nighthorse, Brionne and the beast connect. They climb to the roof and disappear over the wall.

All the riders spend the rest of the winter in the rider camp and discuss their plans for the spring. Stuart reveals the presence of the gold in the crashed truck, and Fisher and Carlo agree to go to Anveney to request supplies from Cassivey to retrieve the gold. Stuart and Chang take on the responsibility of escorting villagers down to Tarmin. Of Brionne and the beast there is no sign, not even in the ambient. Clearly they have returned to the other side of the mountain.

== Main characters ==
Cloud's Rider (Hodder & Stoughton, first British hard cover edition, 1997)

=== Humans ===
- Danny Fisher – junior rider from Shamesey town, 17-years old
- Guil Stuart – border rider working out of Malvey town
- Aby Dale – senior rider and Stuart's partner
- Ancel Harper – senior rider
- Lew Cassivey – businessman in Anveney town
- Tara Chang – senior rider from Tarmin village
- Brionne Goss – Tarmin village blacksmith's daughter, 13-years old
- Carlo Goss – Tarmin village blacksmith's son, 16-years old
- Randy Goss – Tarmin village blacksmith's son, 14-years old
- Ridley Vincint – senior rider and rider camp boss at Evergreen village
- Callie Sabotay – senior rider at Evergreen village and Ridley's partner
- Jennie Sabotay – Ridley and Callie's daughter at Evergreen village, 8-years old
- Darcy Schaffer – Evergreen village doctor
- Van Mackey – Evergreen village blacksmith
- Rick Mackey – Evergreen village blacksmith's son

=== Nighthorses ===
- Cloud – Danny Fisher's young horse
- Burn – Guil Stuart's horse
- Flicker – Tara Chang's horse
- Moon – Aby Dale's horse
- Slip – Ridley Vincint's horse
- Shimmer – Callie's horse
- Rain – Shimmer's 2-year old colt
- Spook – Ancel Harper's horse (Note: Spook is only a nickname, Harper never revealed the name of his horse.)

== See also ==
- List of fictional universes

== Reception ==
Andy Butcher reviewed Cloud's Rider for Arcane magazine, rating it a 7 out of 10 overall, and stated that "Cloud's Rider is an accomplished book. The story is both tense and interesting, and the beautifully crafted world stands out as one of the most original creations in some time — any referee thinking of creating a new setting for their gaming can learn a great deal from Cherryh's work. Unfortunately, Cloud's Rider does suffer from 'sequelitus', in the sense that unless you've already read Rider at the Gate you'll have a tough time working out what's going on here. Still, a damn fine book, and yet another reason to read Rider at the Gate."

== Reviews ==
- Review by Carolyn Cushman (1996) in Locus, #429 October 1996
- Review by Keith Brooke (1997) in Odyssey, November/December 1997, (1997)
- Review by Colin Steele (2001) in SF Commentary, #77
