= Hestia (novel) =

1979 novel by C. J. Cherryh

- Hestia, first edition
- Author: C. J. Cherryh
- Cover artist: Don Maitz
- Language: English
- Genre: Science fiction
- Publisher: DAW Books
- Publication date: September 1, 1979
- Publication place: United States
- Media type: Print (Paperback)
- ISBN: 0-88677-102-1

Hestia is a 1979 science fiction novel by American writer C. J. Cherryh. It is an early novel in her career, about colonists on an alien world and their interactions with the catlike natives, centering on a young engineer sent to solve the colonists' problems, and his relationship with the young native cat-woman in scanty clothing on the cover.

== Plot summary ==
Engineer Sam Merrit has been sent to the struggling colony planet Hestia to build a dam. Since the colony is placed in a large river valley and plagued by seasonal floods, the colonists believe that a dam is essential to enable them to escape the squalid conditions that have persisted there since the founding of the colony over a hundred years ago.

Upon arrival, Merrit finds that the reason the colony is confined to the valley and not making use of flood-safe lands is the presence of cat-like alien natives who attack anyone venturing outside the valley—but the dam will destroy the habitat of many of these natives. Pressured by the colonists to hurry the construction more than he considers safe, Merrit encounters and befriends a native woman, prompting some of the colonists to become hostile towards him as well. Merrit becomes increasingly convinced that ending the conflict with the natives would help the colony more than the dam.

== Sources ==
- C. J. Cherryh (1979), Hestia, DAW Books, ISBN 0-88677-102-1
