= The Fortress Series =

Series of fantasy novels by C. J. Cherryh

Fortress series
- The covers of the books in the series.
- Fortress in the Eye of Time; Fortress of Eagles; Fortress of Owls; Fortress of Dragons; Fortress of Ice
- Author: C. J. Cherryh
- Cover artist: Peter Goodfellow (book 1); Keith Parkinson (book 2); Matthew Stawicki (books 3–5)
- Country: United States
- Language: English
- Genre: Fantasy
- Publisher: HarperCollins
- Published: 1995–2006
- Media type: Print

Fortress is a series of fantasy novels by American writer C. J. Cherryh, published by HarperCollins. They are set in a medieval fantasy world with a 15th-century feel and feature magic, sorcery, medieval warfare, politics and other elements common to the high fantasy subgenre. The first book in the series, Fortress in the Eye of Time, was published in 1995 and followed by Fortress of Eagles in 1998, Fortress of Owls in 1999, Fortress of Dragons in 2000 and Fortress of Ice in 2006. The books are all sub-titled "A Galasien novel".

Unlike some works of high fantasy, Cherryh makes a clear distinction between wizardry (learned like writing and mathematics), sorcery (force of character) and magic (born gift) in this series. Wizardry in the Fortress series is a deliberate act—a technical manipulation of paranormal power to achieve a desired outcome. Sorcery is similar in its deliberate application, but Cherryh reserves the word here exclusively for nefarious spellcasting in the service of evil ends (what might traditionally be called "black magic").

But "magic" itself is something altogether different in the Fortress series. Here, magic is an innate characteristic of a person or object, more like a force of nature than a technical discipline. Places, the Name of a Person and certain Words have strength in them and their knowledge. It is also distinct from wizardry and sorcery in its ability to create effects without consequence. Wizardry must be undertaken with careful study, as it follows the premise that every action causes a reaction. Like choosing to knock over a domino in a room full of other dominoes, a wizard must be careful and precise which domino he knocks over, less he knock over other dominoes in the process. Magic, by contrast, operates outside of these concerns. A user of magic is free to wield his power to whatever end he has the power to effect, without having to worry his actions will result in anything other than his intended goal. The principles follow certain ancient beliefs of the Celtic people that there is a secondary world overlapping ours where spirits ghosts and the fey (also called faeries) live superimposing our world.

Within the novels, Tristen calls this the Gray place, where revenants and happenings get imprinted on Places. Certain rules must be kept within this world, thoughts can be perceived more easily and projected within this world and mortal's dreams slip here as well. It is easily understood why the Sihhë kings and lords of old were perceived as gods, when these beings could use this different 'Place' of existence at will and teleport using magic.

== Plot summary ==
The stories center on Tristen, brought into existence by a magical "shaping" by the ancient wizard Mauryl Gestaurien. Called "Kingmaker" for his role in the founding of the ruling Marhannen dynasty, Mauryl is the last living representative of the great Galasieni race. His once formidable power, however, is declining with age. Doubting his own abilities, he falters during the act of Tristen's summoning, leaving the shaping work partially unfinished.

Tristen is thereby brought into the world not fully formed. Physically he is a normal young man, but he has no memory, knowledge of the world around him, or understanding of his personal identity. Mauryl deliberately leaves the question of Tristen's identity unanswered, and as such Tristen must discover it for himself. They are threatened by a dead sorcerer, Hasufin Heltain, an old enemy (and former student) of Mauryl who seeks to destroy Tristen and return to living corporeal form.

The first novels in the series describe Tristen's coming of age and his developing relationship with Prince Cefwyn, heir to the Marhannen throne. Later novels in the series portray Tristen as he comes to understand his true origins and the full extent of his powers as he confronts his ultimate enemy, the shadow behind Hasufin.

Cherryh also dedicates significant effort to the development of Cefwyn's character as he also comes of age, ascends to the Marhannen throne and confronts the challenges of kingship. Cefwyn must unite the fractious nobles of his court and establish his authority over an independent-minded church hierarchy while simultaneously defending his lands from both internal treachery and external invasion.

As the series develops, Cherryh continues to intertwine the storylines of Tristen and Cefwyn. Tristen becomes a critical bulwark of support for the young king, and Cefwyn helps Tristen to find his place in society with the grant of a peerage and through the close friendship they form. The two are further united by their common enemies, for Hasufin attempts to leverage both internal and external opposition to Cefwyn as a means to gain power and force a final confrontation with Tristen.

== Reception ==
Fortress in the Eye of Time was shortlisted for a Locus Award in 1996. Fortress of Eagles was shortlisted for a Locus Award in 1999. Fortress of Owls was shortlisted for a Locus Award in 2000.
