= Foreigner series =

Fictional universe created by C. J. Cherryh

- Foreigner (10th Anniversary Edition)
- Author: C. J. Cherryh
- Cover artist: Michael Whelan (books 1, 2, 6, & 7), Dorian Vallejo (book 3), Stephen Youll (books 4 & 5), Donato Giancola (books 8 & 9), Todd Lockwood (books 10 onwards)
- Country: United States
- Genre: Science fiction
- Publisher: DAW Books
- Published: 1994–present
- Media type: Print (hardcover and paperback), audiobook
- No. of books: 22

The Foreigner series is a science fiction book series set in a fictional universe created by American writer C. J. Cherryh. The series centers on the descendants of a ship lost in transit from Earth en route to found a new space station. It consists of a series of semi-encapsulated trilogy arcs (or sequences) that focus on the life of Bren Cameron, the human paidhi, a translator-diplomat to the court of the ruling atevi species. Currently twenty-two novels have been published between 1994 and 2023. Cherryh has also self-published two ebook short story prequels to the series, "Deliberations" (October 2012) and "Invitations" (August 2013).

Cherryh calls the series "First Contact". She is the author of all the books, except for Defiance (2023) which is by Cherryh and Jane Fancher. Four of the books were shortlisted for the Locus Award for Best Science Fiction Novel. Cherryh has also been awarded several other honors for other works, including two Hugo Awards and a Robert A. Heinlein Award.

== Works ==
Trilogy arc 1

- Foreigner (1994)
- Invader (1995)
- Inheritor (1996)

Trilogy arc 2

- Precursor (1999)
- Defender (2001)
- Explorer (2002)

Trilogy arc 3

- Destroyer (2005)
- Pretender (2006)
- Deliverer (2007)

Trilogy arc 4

- Conspirator (2009)
- Deceiver (2010)
- Betrayer (2011)

Trilogy arc 5

- Intruder (2012)
- Protector (2013)
- Peacemaker (2014)

Trilogy arc 6

- Tracker (2015)
- Visitor (2016)
- Convergence (2017)

Trilogy arc 7

- Emergence (2018)
- Resurgence (2020)
- Divergence (2020)

Trilogy arc 8

- Defiance (2023) (with Jane Fancher)

Short stories

- "Deliberations" (2012)
- "Invitations" (2013)

== Introduction ==
The Foreigner series opens with the failure of a starship. A brief preamble to the first book describes a system failure that leaves the faster-than-light colony ship Phoenix stranded in a far-flung reach of space, without any idea of how to get home, completely unable even to locate Sol in the visible stars. Phoenix is carrying colonists and equipment to establish a new space station to extend Earth's interstellar trade empire.

The initial text outlines the effort to refuel Phoenix near the sun and navigate the vessel to a different environment. Several crew members died during this operation.

The habitable environment that the damaged starship can reach is the homeworld of the atevi, a species with steam-age technology.

The humans build their station in orbit around the atevi world, but tensions build between the colonists and the Phoenix crew. The Pilot's Guild, comfortable with the power it has accrued during the emergency, and stripped of its best elements by the battle to refuel, has become oppressive and oligarchic. When the refueled Phoenix leaves to explore the local space and establish a further station, the colonists become restless.

When Phoenix is slow to return, some of the colonists choose to abandon the station in crude parachuting landers (much akin to NASA's Project Mercury), despite the efforts of the remaining Pilot's Guild to retain the colonists and control, until the space station becomes unviable and is abandoned entirely.

On the surface the humans encounter the atevi, a species of ebon-skinned humanoids, for whom math is as intrinsic as breathing. Atevi possess no directly corresponding concept of liking or loving another person, but instead place utmost importance on a concept called man'chi, most directly analogous to loyalty. Man'chi is not merely a cultural construct, but is an intrinsic drive, a natural instinct to follow a leader, and is therefore a difference between the two species that cannot be bridged.

After an initial period of peaceful co-existence, cross-cultural misunderstandings lead to the War of the Landing. Despite their vast technological advantage the colonists lose, and swiftly. In the aftermath of the war, the atevi government abandons the island of Mospheira to allow the establishment of an enclave for the human colonists. Only one human, the paidhi (interpreter), is allowed to live among atevi and learn one of their languages. All communication between the atevi and the humans is via this single point of contact.

On the island of Mospheira the colonists prosper. As part of the treaty of the landing that ceded Mospheira to humans a succession of paidhiin broker a managed transfer of technology to the atevi, all the while creating dictionaries so that the next paidhi can further the work of understanding and technology transfer.

Fast forward 200 years. The colonists on Mospheira are comfortable and self-absorbed. The atevi are close to technological parity, and have outpaced the humans in some areas. All seems peaceful and manageable. Against this background the main story of the first book of the series unfolds as, unknown to the main protagonist, paidhi Bren Cameron, Phoenix returns to orbit.

The remaining books focus on the interrelations among Bren Cameron, Tabini (the aiji, the head of the most powerful atevi clan, keystone of the atevi western association, and thus effective supreme ruler of the atevi government), his atevi associates, the human enclave of Mospheira, the humans aboard Phoenix, and an alien presence in the nearer stars.

The first eight books of the series are told exclusively from the viewpoint of Bren Cameron, the paidhi at the time of Phoenix's return. Starting with the ninth book, Deliverer, occasional passages are told from the point of view of Tabini's young son, Cajeiri, as he grows into maturity.

== Major characters ==
- Bren Cameron, paidhi and later paidhi-aiji, translator to the court of Tabini.
- Tabini, aiji of Shejidan, supreme leader of the atevi.
- Ilisidi, the aiji-dowager, grandmother of Tabini, and twice denied the throne by the hasdrawad, a house of the atevi parliament.
- Banichi, Bren's male Assassin's Guild guard, assigned from Tabini's own staff in the first novel together with Jago.
- Jago, Bren's female Assassin's Guild guard. Later becomes Bren's lover.
- Cajeiri, minor son of Tabini, invested heir to the aishidi'tat.
- Damiri, aiji-consort to Tabini and mother of Cajeiri. Has problematic family connections.
- Tatiseigi, a conservative lord of the Northern Association, uncle of Tabini's wife (Damiri), great-uncle of Cajeiri.
- Geigi, a provincial lord, trusted ally of Ilisidi.
- Machigi, one of several lords of the Marid Association, a southern territory nominally in rebellion against Tabini.
- Ramirez, seniormost of the Phoenix captains when it arrived at the atevi homeworld. Keeper of many secrets. Dies in Defender.
- Ogun, a captain of Phoenix, second only to Ramirez.
- Sabin, a captain of Phoenix, second only to Ogun. Leads the trip to Reunion station.
- Jason Graham, Phoenix crewmember selected by the captains to learn Ragi (the dominant atevi language). Later becomes a Phoenix captain.

== Story arcs ==
Each arc consists of three novels. Each arc deals with an entire storyline, although there are cross-connections as the series has progressed. Roughly 10 years of time are supposed to have elapsed (per the novel) from Book 1, Foreigner, to Book 8, Pretender.

- Arc 1 (Foreigner, Invader, Inheritor): focuses on an assassination attempt against Bren Cameron, an act illegal by the peace treaty made following the War of the Landing. The attempt proves to be a conspiracy by factions of humans and atevi to depose Bren as the paidhi, or official translator between the two cultures. The Starship Phoenix returns, causing the entire system to come out of balance, causing political unrest on both Mospheira and the mainland, and while the atevi change from simple rocketry to advanced single-stage-to-orbit shuttles, radically altering their economic and industrial base in the process.
- Arc 2 (Precursor, Defender, Explorer): focuses on Bren as he is elevated by Tabini to be the Lord of the Heavens, making him a lord of the aishidi'tat with authority to negotiate. Bren is then charged with taking Tabini's heir, Cajeiri, and Ilisidi, Cajeiri's great-grandmother, to see to a threat of aliens encountered by Phoenix, but Bren and the aiji-dowager must first solve a mutiny aboard Phoenix.
- Arc 3 (Destroyer, Pretender, Deliverer): focuses on the return of Bren Cameron, Ilisidi and Cajeiri from deep space and their encounter with the alien Kyo. They find the aishidi'tat in tatters, Tabini-aiji rumored to be dead, and Murini, the pretender-aiji, on the throne in Shejidan. The kyo will expect to meet a unified planet under the rule of Tabini-aiji. Bren, the dowager, and the aiji must restore order before the kyo arrive for negotiations.
- Arc 4 (Conspirator, Deceiver, Betrayer): set in the immediate aftermath of the third arc, and is set against the shifting political relations between the different Atevi ethnic factions. With Tabini restored in Shejidan, Bren must find a way to stabilise the Western and coastal regions where he has his own Lordly estate. The peace gained with the restoration of Tabini's rule is threatened by long standing ethnic and cultural differences between the ruling Ragi Atevi and the more conservative Edi and Eastern clans.
- Arc 5 (Intruder, Protector, Peacemaker): Arc is about Cajeiri's felicitous 9th birthday, the final disposition of the Shadow Guild, and the birth of the Aiji's daughter.
- Arc 6 (Tracker, Visitor, Convergence): For the past two arcs, Bren has focused on Atevi associations and political conflicts. In this arc, Bren must address the political situation on Alpha station resulting from the influx of Reunioners, as the Kyo approach to visit. Then Bren revisits Mospheira, and explains how politics and the world have changed while he has been dealing with everything else. Several chapters are from the view of Cajeiri.
- Arc 7 (Emergence, Resurgence, Divergence) Arc deals with setting plans in place to get the 5000 Reunioners down to Mospheira. Also with Ilisidi's campaign to connect the East with the South and other remote regions with trade, and putting an end to the last remnants of the Shadow Guild.
- Arc 8 (Defiance) In this arc, the refugees are finally going to be settled in Mospheira and the Shadow Guild is all but eliminated. Ilisidi's health is also deteriorating.

== Genre ==
As with many of C. J. Cherryh's novels, this series could be best described as anthropological science fiction, focusing on the interface between our human customs and understandings and that of an alien species whose motivations, thoughts and even feelings are diametrically opposed to our own. Broadly speaking, the series could also be described as space opera, especially the second and third story arcs. It also contains elements of political thriller, with the complex racial and cultural interplay between humans and atevi, and between ship crew and colonist.

Like other works, such as the Chanur novels, Cuckoo's Egg and her other alien centered novels, the Foreigner series brings in a peppering of alien names and concepts attached to the language.

The atevi have no feeling immediately equivalent to love, but rather man'chi—a loyalty-web to one's leader, one's leader's leader, and so on outward until the Aiji of Shejidan, leader of the aishidi'tat or union of all atevi. Political boundaries are not based on territory, but on association—where their man'chi lies.

Inherent to the mental structure of an atevi is arithmetical ability we would consider intuitive and a world viewed in arithmetical terms. The main atevi language Ragi is a continual mathematic construct. Properly forming statements requires effort similar to a mathematician keeping equations balanced.

Stringently asserted is the idea that the number two to the atevi is disharmonious and as unnerving as fingernails on a chalkboard is to humans. The number three however is "felicitous", and ideas are spoken using felicitous numbers – unless the speaker wishes to convey disharmony or anti-social ideas to their audience.

Another aspect of atevi culture that is critical to the stories, particularly the political thriller aspect, is that assassination is a legal and accepted means of settling disputes, provided proper protocol is followed. It is preferred over lawsuits. One files a document of Intent which liberates the target to file one back. The Assassin's Guild has the right, often exercised when Intent is filed for foolish reasons, to reject a particular filing. For this reason, the assassins' guild (commonly referred to as simply "the guild") has considerable power, despite being supposedly neutral. Assassins are also employed as bodyguards, and often need to defend against attacks by others of their own guild.

== Adaptations ==
Audible.com has released the first 19 books as single-narrator audiobooks. The narrator is Daniel Thomas May.

An audio drama of the first three books of the Foreigner series was scheduled for production in 2013, however the effort appears to have been suspended.

The first installment of the Foreigner series celebrated its 10th anniversary in 2004 with a new edition. The similar 30th anniversary edition followed in 2024 after its initial release in 1994.

== Reception ==
Four books in the series have been shortlisted for the Locus Award for Best Science Fiction Novel: Foreigner in 1995, Invader in 1996, Defender in 2002, and Visitor in 2017.

== See also ==
- Alliance-Union universe
