= Fires of Azeroth =

1979 novel by C. J. Cherryh

- First edition
- Author: C. J. Cherryh
- Cover artist: Michael Whelan
- Language: English
- Series: The Morgaine Stories
- Genre: Fantasy
- Publisher: DAW Books
- Publication date: 1979
- Publication place: United States
- Media type: Print (Paperback)
- ISBN: 0-88677-259-1
- Preceded by: Well of Shiuan (1978)
- Followed by: Exile's Gate (1988)

Fires of Azeroth is a 1979 fantasy novel by American writer C. J. Cherryh. It is the third of four books composing The Morgaine Stories, chronicling the quest that drives an obsessed Morgaine and her warrior companion, Nhi Vanye i Chya, ever onward.

== Plot summary ==
The Gates are passageways through space and time that can, if misused, destroy entire civilizations. Such cataclysms had happened in the past, most recently to the qhal, a species that at one time had enslaved other races, including humans. The Union Science Bureau had dispatched a hundred men and women on a one-way mission to destroy the Gates, closing them behind them as they traveled from one world to the next. Morgaine is the last survivor of that band.

In Vanye's world, they had been opposed by an evil ancient being whose knowledge of the Gates rivals Morgaine's own. The creature had taken over the body of Chya Roh, Vanye's cousin, then fled through the Gate of Ivrel to the land of Shiuan. There, he had amassed an army by promising men and half-breed qhal a way out of their dying world. It had taken all of Morgaine's guile to force a passage for her and Vanye through the Gate of Shiuan into a third world, but they were powerless to stop Roh from following with his forces.

Being two against a hundred thousand, they are forced to flee into the forests of Azeroth, finding shelter with friendly villagers. Eventually, the natives call on their qhal lord for guidance. Morgaine meets with Merir, lord of Shathan, and receives grudging permission to travel where she wills.

The invading army came through the Master Gate. Morgaine heads to Nehmin, where the Gate's controls are located, but on the way, they are attacked. She is seriously wounded, but manages to flee. Vanye is captured by humans led by Fwar, who has a grudge against him. Before he can be tortured overmuch, Vanye is seized by the khal, who resent Roh's power over them. They want any information of the Gates that the prisoner may have. However, Roh is informed and rescues his cousin.

Vanye finds the camp deeply divided: Fwar's barrowlanders resented by the more numerous marsh people, both groups hating and being despised in turn by the khal, nominally led by Hetharu, but themselves split into factions. Roh barely maintains control over the rabble because of his knowledge of the Gates, or Fires as they are called in this world. Knowing the situation to be unstable, Roh tries to leave quietly with Vanye and Fwar's band, but the khal are alerted and pursue. It is a close race, but some of them reach the shelter of the forest, where the few barrowlanders not caught and killed by the khal are dispatched by Roh and Vanye.

Vanye guides Roh to Merir, but the lord of Shathan has no news of Morgaine. Merir decides that they must go to Nehmin for answers. There, Vanye finds Morgaine, recovered from her near-fatal wounds. The guardians of Nehmin have ignored her counsel, distrusting her motives, and now they are under siege. At last, Morgaine forces them to recognize not just the immediate danger, but the ever-present temptation of the power of the Gates; they agree to close them after she and Vanye depart, even though they are their main defense against the horde.

Before she leaves, Morgaine offers her assistance against their common enemy. In the desperate fighting, Hetharu and Shien, his main khal rival, are killed. With Fwar already dead, the enemy is left leaderless; the various factions unexpectedly turn on each other, ending the threat.

There remains only Roh to trouble Morgaine. Even though the Gates will be shut down, he can reactivate them. Vanye has discovered first-hand that the Roh he knew and admired had not been killed when his body was taken over. Gradually, that Roh has regained control, or so Vanye believes. Morgaine is not entirely convinced, but allows Roh to remain alive (though under watch) when she and Vanye leave Azeroth.

In the epilogue, Roh's bow is laid to rest by two inhabitants of Azeroth (including a man, who as a child Vanye had befriended) by a deactivated Gate, showing that Roh remained in control until his death.

== Characters ==
- Morgaine
- Nhi Vanye
- Chya Roh
- Merir, lord of Shathan
- Hetharu, leader of the khal invaders
- Shien, Hetharu's main rival
- Fwar, chief of the human barrowlanders

== Sources ==
- C. J. Cherryh. Fires of Azeroth. DAW Books 1979. ISBN 0-88677-259-1.
