= Well of Shiuan =

1978 novel by C. J. Cherryh

- First edition
- Author: C. J. Cherryh
- Cover artist: Michael Whelan
- Language: English
- Series: The Morgaine Stories
- Genre: Fantasy
- Publisher: DAW Books
- Publication date: 1978
- Publication place: United States
- Media type: Print (paperback)
- ISBN: 0-87997-986-0
- Preceded by: Gate of Ivrel (1976)
- Followed by: Fires of Azeroth (1979)

Well of Shiuan is a 1978 fantasy novel by American author C.J. Cherryh. It is the second installment in the four-part Morgaine Stories series. The novel follows the ongoing quest of Morgaine, a determined and enigmatic woman, and her reluctant warrior companion, Nhi Vanye i Chya, as they traverse different worlds to close the Gates—ancient constructs capable of catastrophic destruction when misused. The story explores themes of loyalty, sacrifice, and the tension between duty and morality.

== Plot summary ==
Mija Jherun, a fey seventeen-year-old peasant woman, lives in a world inexorably being overwhelmed by the sea. One day, after looting a barrow, the tomb of a young warrior-king, she is chased by an armored man on horseback back to her village. He breaks into the poor home she shares with her family, helps himself to some food, and asks if anyone has seen a pale woman on a grey horse. After repulsing an attack by the men of the village, he departs for Shiuan, a richer land ruled by the khal, another race that is enough like humans to successfully interbreed.

Jherun, yearning for a less bleak future than marrying the thuggish Fwar, runs after him. Instead of finding him, she stumbles upon his mortal enemies: his cousin, Nhi Vanye, and Vanye's lord, Morgaine, the pale woman.

They inform her that Chya Roh's body had been taken over by an evil creature who had extended his life countless times by this means. He had betrayed Morgaine and sent ten thousand men to their doom a century before. Fleeing her, he had passed through a Gate from Vanye's world to this one, closing the passageway forever, but not quickly enough to prevent Morgaine and Vanye from following.

Jherun knows of two Gates, which she calls Wells. The newcomers had emerged from one; the other is in Shiuan. Morgaine's mission is to travel from world to world, closing their Gates permanently, as they can (and have in the past) destroyed whole civilizations when their immense power is misused. She is the last survivor of a band of one hundred sent for that purpose. Vanye is a chance-met warrior, bound to obey her initially by his stubborn sense of honor and later for other reasons.

As they travel towards Shiuan, it begins to rain heavily. They become separated when Vanye is knocked off his horse by an uprooted tree carried by the rapidly rising, onrushing water. He finds Jherun, but not Morgaine. Knowing that Morgaine will make for the Well of Shiuan, he heads there also, accompanied by Jherun.

Along the way, Jherun persuades him to seek food and shelter at the fortress of Ohtij-in, held by half-breed khal. This proves to be a grave mistake, as Roh had preceded him there. He treats Vanye well, claiming that the Roh Vanye knew still coexists with his "murderer"; Vanye is uncertain and does not kill him when Roh deliberately gives him the opportunity.

Roh has promised the khal a way out of their dying world. The old lord, Bydarra, is skeptical, but his ruthless son Hetharu murders his father and puts the blame on Vanye. He assembles his forces and heads off to the Gate with Roh. Vanye is left behind, a prisoner of Hetharu's brother Kithan, but is rescued by Morgaine and an army she has recruited from Jherun's people and their neighbors, the marshlanders.

However, when they learn what Morgaine intends, they turn on her, forcing her to kill many with her advanced weapons. Morgaine, Vanye, Jherun and Kithan flee on horseback, followed by the mob on foot.

They reach the control room for the Gate of Shiuan, only to find that Roh has opened the Gate and locked the controls. He has also left a message: he will allow Vanye safe passage through, but not Morgaine. She orders Vanye to go to Roh, wait his chance to kill him, and continue on with her mission. Knowing that the two of them stand no chance against Roh's army, he reluctantly obeys, taking the other two with him. Roh sees through the ruse immediately, but still accepts his cousin.

As they prepare to pass through the Gate, Morgaine attacks with the human rabble, with which she has forged an uneasy alliance. In the confusion, Vanye fights his way to her, and together they force their way through, to continue their quest on yet another world. The rest, khal and human alike, follow, save Jherun and Kithan. Then the Gate closes.

== Characters ==
- Morgaine
- Nhi Vanye
- Chya Roh, an ancient being who lives by taking others' bodies
- Mija Jherun, a seventeen-year-old peasant woman
- Bydarra, lord of Ohtij-in, father of Hetharu and Kithan
- Hetharu, ambitious new leader of the khal of Ohtij-in by virtue of his patricide
- Kithan, Hetharu's brother
- Fwar, leader of the human barrowlanders

== Reviews ==
- Brown, C. (July–August 1978). "Review of Well of Shiuan". Isaac Asimov's Science Fiction Magazine. Vol. 2, no. 4. p. 17.
- Collier, Ann (February 1982). "Review of Well of Shiuan". Vector. Vol. 107, no. 1. pp. 30–32.
- del Rey, Lester (May 1978). "Review of Well of Shiuan". Analog Science Fiction and Fact. Vol. 98, no. 5. pp. 172–174.
- Trusesdale, David (July 1978). "Review of Well of Shiuan". Science Fiction Review. Vol. 7, no. 3. p. 39.
- "Review of Well of Shiuan". Publishers Weekly. Vol. 213, no. 10. March 6, 1978. pp. 99–100.
- Wolansky, T. (September 1979). "Review of Well of Shiuan". Science Fiction and Fantasy Book Review. Vol. 1, no. 8. p. 108.
