= The Morgaine Stories =

Science fantasy series of novels by C. J. Cherryh

- Gate of Ivrel, the first novel in the Morgaine Cycle. The cover art depicts Morgaine and Vanye in front of a time-gate; Morgaine is unsheathing her gate-destroying sword.
- Gate of Ivrel; Well of Shiuan; Fires of Azeroth; Exile's Gate
- Author: C. J. Cherryh
- Cover artist: Michael Whelan
- Genre: fantasy
- Publisher: DAW Books
- Published: 1978–1988

The Morgaine Stories, also known as The Morgaine Cycle, are a series of fantasy novels by American writer C. J. Cherryh, published by DAW Books. They concern a time-traveling heroine, Morgaine, and her loyal companion Nhi Vanye i Chya.

The first book in the series, Gate of Ivrel (1976), was Cherryh's first published novel, and was followed soon thereafter by Well of Shiuan (1978) and Fires of Azeroth (1979).

The construct at the center of these novels is a set of "Gates" that connect various worlds. In addition to traveling from place to place, the Gates can also be used for time travel. Cherryh has cited the works of Edgar Rice Burroughs and Andre Norton as influences in the development of her gate system. This blending of technology and elements more common to fantasy often results in the books being labeled as works of "science fantasy".

Cherryh was made a member of the Swordsmen and Sorcerers' Guild of America, an informal group of American fantasy authors active from the 1960s through the 1980s, for the Morgaine Stories.

== Books in the series ==
=== The Novels ===
- Cherryh, C. J. Gate of Ivrel, DAW Books, 1976.
- Cherryh, C. J. Well of Shiuan, DAW Books, 1978.
- Cherryh, C. J. Fires of Azeroth, DAW Books, 1979.
- Cherryh, C. J. Exile's Gate, DAW Books, 1988.

=== Collected editions ===
The first three novels have been published together in omnibus editions as:

- Cherryh, C. J. The Book of Morgaine (omnibus), Nelson Doubleday / Science Fiction Book Club, 1979.
- Cherryh, C. J. The Chronicles of Morgaine (omnibus), Methuen Publishing, 1985.
- Cherryh, C. J. The Morgaine Saga, (omnibus), DAW Books, 2000, ISBN 0-88677-877-8.

== Adaptations ==
In April 2013 it was announced that the screen rights to The Morgaine Stories have been optioned by producer Aaron Magnani, with adaptations by Peter Arneson. The screenplay for the first novel in the series, Gate of Ivrel has already been written by Arneson.

In the 1980s, Jane Fancher began a graphic novel adaptation of Gate of Ivrel in close collaboration with Cherryh. Although it was never completed, Fancher self-published one segment of the work with a color cover and black and white interior art entitled C. J. Cherryh's Gate of Ivrel No. 1 (1985). Two parts of the adaptation were subsequently published as full color versions by The Donning Company under its Starblaze Graphics imprint: Gate of Ivrel: Claiming Rites (1986) and Gate of Ivrel: Fever Dreams (1987). In 1987, Tor Books published an interactive novel set in Morgaine's universe, The Witchfires of Leth.
