= Cassandra (short story) =

1978 science fiction short story by C. J. Cherryh

- Short story by C. J. Cherryh
- Country: United States
- Language: English
- Genre(s): Science fiction

Publication
- Published in: The Magazine of Fantasy & Science Fiction
- Publication type: Periodical
- Publisher: Mercury Publications
- Media type: Print (magazine)
- Publication date: October 1978

"Cassandra" is a science fiction short story by American writer C. J. Cherryh. It was first published in The Magazine of Fantasy & Science Fiction in October 1978, and won the Hugo Award for Best Short Story in 1979. It was only her second published short story, after "The Dark King" (1977).

"Cassandra" has been translated into German, French, Polish, Italian and Romanian.

Short story writing is an activity that Cherryh generally only undertakes upon request or when an idea surfaces that does not lend itself to a novel. Receiving a Hugo Award for this story therefore came as a complete surprise to Cherryh.

This short story is Cherryh's modern take on the Greek mythological figure Cassandra who had the gift of prophecy.

== Plot summary ==
The gift of prescience, rather than a blessing, is a curse for the mythological character Cassandra that she cannot control. She sees the future all the time and cannot turn it off. In Cherryh's story, Crazy Alis leaves her burning apartment each morning and heads for the bombed-out coffee shop, passing charred corpses on the way. She knows it's going to happen but can do nothing about it. When the bombs do come and fire engulfs the city, her foresight actually saves her, but at what cost? She is the sole beneficiary of her misfortune in an otherwise non-functional existence.

== Awards and nominations ==
- 1979 – Hugo Award for Best Short Story: winner
- 1979 – Nebula Award for Best Short Story: runner up
- 1979 – Locus Award for Best Short Story: runner up
- 1999 – Named one of Locus magazine's 50 best science fiction short stories of all time

== Sources ==
- C. J. Cherryh. The Collected Short Fiction of C. J. Cherryh. DAW Books 2004. ISBN 0-7564-0217-4.
