= Cuckoo's Egg (book) =

1985 science fiction novel by C. J. Cherryh

- Cuckoo's Egg cover, depicts the Shonun Duun cradling the infant human Thorn.
- Author: C. J. Cherryh
- Cover artist: Michael Whelan
- Language: English
- Genre: Science fiction
- Publisher: DAW Books
- Publication date: March 1985
- Publication place: United States
- ISBN: 0-932096-34-4
- OCLC: 11981291

Cuckoo's Egg is a science fiction novel by American writer C. J. Cherryh, which introduces a fictional race (the Shonunin) raising a human boy. It was published by DAW Books in 1985, and there was also a limited hardcover printing by Phantasia Press in the same year. The book was nominated for the Hugo Award and longlisted for the Locus Award for Best Novel. It was later reprinted along with Cherryh's novel Serpent's Reach in the 2005 omnibus volume The Deep Beyond.

The book's title is a reference the practice of brood parasitism among certain species of cuckoos, both Old and New World birds. In this practice, the cuckoos lay their eggs in other birds' nests and the unwitting hosts then expend their energy hatching the cuckoo's eggs, even at the potential expense of their own offspring. The metaphor is not correctly applied in this case because the Shonun in the book is knowingly and deliberately raising a human child rather than having been tricked into doing so.

In Cuckoo's Egg Cherryh adopts the less common approach in science fiction stories containing aliens of relating the story from the alien's (Shonunin) perspective, thus making the humans the aliens.

== Plot ==
Dana Duun Shtoni no Lughn (Duun), a member of the Shonunin race, becomes the guardian of an alien infant who is, by the description of its appearance, a human. Naming the infant Haras, meaning Thorn, Duun chooses to give him a childhood similar to Duun's own, in isolation in the remote Sheon. The two are periodically visited by meds and Ellud, a government representative. As Thorn grows to early childhood, Duun trains him according to the ways of the warrior Guild to which Duun belongs, the Hatani. The Hatani are a class of warrior-judges revered by most Shonunin, given absolute jurisdiction to solve conflicts, yet isolated from society.

As Thorn grows, he becomes more disturbed by his physical differences from the few Shonunin he has contact with, but Duun refuses to give him answers about his origins. During an outdoor training exercise when Thorn is sixteen years old, he encounters Shonunin settlers nearby, who were aware of his existence. They become frightened and begin to hunt him. Thorn and Duun escape relatively unharmed, but Duun decides they must leave Sheon. Duun tells Thorn that his appearance is not a genetic mistake and reveals that Thorn has no parents: he was born from an artificial womb.

Thorn and Duun are transported to the capital of Dsonan. Thorn begins training with different Shonun tutors, learning about mathematics and the history of Shonun air travel. He is asked to listen to tapes and replicate the strange sounds on them. Under more experiments, he has visions of beings that look like himself, and eventually comes to understand the sounds as a language.

Thorn completes his training and passes the final tests to be officially recognized as a Hatani. Afterwards, Thorn and Duun are transported to space stations, pursued by enemies who want control of Thorn for their political means. At last, Duun tells Thorn the truth of his origins.

Duun describes the first contact between the Shonunin and aliens, which occurred when a damaged alien probe entered the Shonunin's home system. The contact turned violent. It was not clear who fired the first shot, but the Shonunin, who had only recently become capable of interstellar travel themselves, chased the damaged alien ship, which had lost the ability to jump through hyperspace, for two years before overpowering it. They found only one of the crew alive, a man who was able to injure Duun before being killed. The Shonunin knew the probe had been sending messages out of the Solar System and now feared retribution from the technologically superior aliens.

Duun was charged with the task of saving the Shonunin world from the potential threat the aliens posed, and as a Hatani was given absolute control and resources for his plan. Duun's solution was to raise an alien child to adulthood who could serve as an emissary to his race when contact was made again, and hopefully prevent a major conflict. Scientists cloned the alien Duun killed to produce the alien child. Raising an alien and the enemy in their midst frightened the Shonunin, but Duun elected to undertake the task himself, uncertain whether the creature would turn on him. By raising Thorn under the Hatani code, Duun has made Thorn part of the framework of Shonunin society and prepared him for his eventual ambassadorial duties.

The aliens have been sending messages back to the Shonunin works for several years. Thorn reconciles his origins with his relationship with Duun and the Shonunin. He sends out his first interstellar message in the alien language, saying hello.

== Main characters ==
- Dana Duun Shtoni no Lughn (Duun) – a Shonun of the Hatani warrior Guild. He is heavily scarred and is missing two of the four fingers on one of his hands.
- Haras (Thorn) – a Human, raised by Duun as an Hatani.
- Betan – a Shonun who become Thorn's tutor and the first female he has met. Thorn develops an attraction to her, but she is revealed to secretly be a Ghota agent.
- Sagot – a teacher

== Reception ==
Translator and poet Burton Raffel wrote in an essay "C.J. Cherryh's Fiction" that Cuckoo's Egg is "as fine and stirring as anything Cherryh has ever done", and that "it is in a way a brilliant tour de force, looking at humans entirely from an alien perspective. Science fiction author David Langford described the book as a "good read", saying that the master-pupil relationship is "very nicely done", and that "Cherryh's worked hard to make you want the answers to each riddle".

== Relationship with the Alliance-Union universe ==
Because of Cherryh's use of the tightly-limited third-person storytelling, it is never stated whether Cuckoo's Egg is a part of the Alliance-Union universe or not. J. G. Stinson in her essay "The Human as Other in the Science Fiction Novels of C.J. Cherryh" maintains it is not, although some bibliographies indicate that it is set in this universe.

== The Age of Exploration ==
Cuckoo's Egg is from C. J. Cherryh's Age of Exploration series, a collection of three science fiction novels that share a common theme, but are unrelated to each other:

- Port Eternity (1982)
- Voyager in Night (1984)
- Cuckoo's Egg (1985)
