= The Paladin (Cherryh novel) =

1988 novel by C. J. Cherryh

- The Paladin original cover
- Author: C. J. Cherryh
- Cover artist: Gary Ruddell
- Language: English
- Genre: Fantasy
- Published: 1988 Baen Books
- Publication place: United States
- Media type: Print (hardback & paperback)
- Pages: 400 (paperback)
- ISBN: 0-671-31837-3
- OCLC: 49015067

The Paladin is a 1988 fantasy novel by American writer C. J. Cherryh. It was published by Baen Books and was nominated for the Locus Award for Best Fantasy Novel in 1989. The book features no actual magic or supernatural occurrences, and is considered an example of the low fantasy subgenre of fantasy fiction. It takes place in a fictional country modeled on Tang dynasty China.

== Plot summary ==
The Lord Saukendar, Imperial sword master and stalwart supporter of the Emperor is betrayed, falsely accused of an affair with his childhood sweetheart Lady Meiya, now the Emperor's wife. Meiya is dead, and hostile forces have command of the Emperor's regency. Wounded, desperate and cut off from his supporters, Saukendar runs for the border.

In a homemade cabin high in the hills Saukendar survives crippled and alone, his warhorse Jiro and his regrets his only company, while the empire is bled by the rapacious warlords that are regent to the Emperor. Only occasional assassins dispatched by the Regent disturb his morose existence.

Taizu, a country girl from Hua locates him, demands he teach her sufficient swordsmanship to exact her revenge for her people's suffering. Despite his better judgment and strenuous efforts to discourage her, she forces him to take her on as apprentice swordswoman. Shoka, as he prefers to be known to his friends, becomes fond of the girl.

In the process of teaching her and supporting her cause, they become embroiled in the affairs of empire, becoming the spearhead of a revolt that rescues the Emperor from his Regent and his people from the clutches of the warlords.
