= Jane Fancher =

American science fiction and fantasy writer

- Born: October 24, 1952 (age 73); Renton, Washington
- Occupation: Novelist
- Spouse: C. J. Cherryh (m. 2014)
- Writing career
- Genres: Science fiction, Fantasy

Jane Suzanne Fancher (born 1952) is a science fiction and fantasy author and artist.

== Work ==
In the early 1980s, she worked for Warp Graphics as an art assistant on Elfquest, providing inking assistance on the black and white comics and coloring on Books 2 and 3 of the original graphic novel reprints. Reprint editions omitted her name from the art credits, and later graphic novel editions used different coloring.

She adapted portions of C. J. Cherryh's Gate of Ivrel, the first novel in Cherryh's Morgaine series. Gate of Ivrel: No. 1 (1985) was a self-published black and white comic book that lasted one issue. Fancher expanded the material in color intending a series of graphic novels: Gate of Ivrel: Claiming Rites (1986) and Gate of Ivrel: Fever Dreams (1987). The adaptations were done in collaboration with Cherryh. She did not complete the series, but the experience led to Fancher becoming a prose author herself, as well as frequent professional collaboration and eventual marriage with Cherryh.

Fancher's books include the "Groundties" series, as well as the "Dance of the Rings" trilogy: Ring of Lightning (1995); Ring of Intrigue (1997), and Ring of Destiny (1999).

The "Groundties" trilogy (Groundties, Uplink, Harmonies of the 'Net) was published in e-book form in 2011. There is also a prequel, titled the 'NetWalkers.

Fancher, Cherryh and author Lynn Abbey run an online publishing house, Closed Circle, to market their own work.

== Personal life ==
Fancher was born in Renton, Washington on October 24, 1952.

She has virtual degrees in Physics and Anthropology from Washington State University and training in computer programming, psychology, philosophy, and history.

Fancher currently lives in Spokane, Washington with what she mischievously calls her 'spousal unit', science fiction writer C. J. Cherryh (Carolyn Janice Cherry). The two had been domestic partners for years before being married on May 17, 2014.

== Bibliography ==
Illustrated adaptations with C. J. Cherryh

- Gate of Ivrel: Fever Dreams (April 1989), ISBN 0-89865-556-0
- Gate of Ivrel: Claiming Rites (April 1989), ISBN 978-0898655155

Illustration

- Elfquest Book 2 by Wendy and Richard Pini (June 1982), ISBN 0898652464

As J. S. Fancher

- GroundTies (October 1991), ISBN 978-0446361484
- Uplink (March 1992), ISBN 0446362557
- Harmonies of the 'Net (October 1992), ISBN 9780446362436

As Jane S. Fancher

- Dance of The Rings series
  - Ring of Lightning (June 1995), ISBN 978-0886776534
  - Ring of Intrigue (January 1997), ISBN 9780886777197
  - Ring of Destiny (December 1999), ISBN 9780886778705

As J. Fancher

- Blood Red Moon: Nights of the Blood Red Moon Vol 1 (April 2011), ASIN B004YR55FA

Ebooks only

- Rings of Change: Allizant
- Nights of the Blood Red Moon Flux: A BRM Short Story: A Tale from the Alexander Years (2011)
- 'Netwalkers: Part I Partners ASIN B00AW1GJ20
- 'Netwalkers: Part II: Of Mentors and Mimetrons, ASIN B00AW1BU6K
- Netwalkers: Omnibus (prequel to GroundTies), containing Partners and Of Mentors and Mimetrons
- Netwalkers: Book II Wild Cards, ASIN B00GT0NV2O
- Netwalkers: Book III NeXus, ASIN B00GTB3INA

with C. J. Cherryh

- Chernevog (revised ebook edition; 2012)
- Alliance Rising (2019) – Prometheus Award winner 2020, ASIN B07CG3RW8H
- Alliance Unbound (2024)
- Defiance (2023), part of the Foreigner series.
