= Alternate Realities (Cherryh) =

2000 omnibus of three novels by C. J. Cherryh

- Alternate Realities cover
- Author: C. J. Cherryh
- Cover artist: Don Maitz
- Language: English
- Genre: Science fiction
- Published: 2000 (DAW Books)
- Publication place: United States
- Pages: 528 (paperback)
- ISBN: 0-88677-946-4
- OCLC: 45596151
- LC Class: CPB Box no. 1930 vol. 3

Alternate Realities is a 2000 omnibus collection of three short science fiction novels by American writer author C. J. Cherryh: Wave Without a Shore (1981), Port Eternity (1982), and Voyager in Night (1984). All three novels are set in Cherryh's Alliance-Union universe and share a common theme of people encountering and coping with a reality different from their own.

The original books as well as the omnibus edition were all published by DAW Books. The novels are what Cherryh and her publisher at DAW, Donald A. Wollheim, referred to as "magic cookie" books. Such works explore unusual themes and ideas in science fiction, and can in some sense be seen as thought experiments. Wollheim encouraged Cherryh to experiment in this way during the late 1970s and early 1980s because he felt that the science fiction market would support such unusual offerings at the time.

One consequence of this approach is that the original novels were therefore short by contemporary standards, each having only approximately 90,000 words. The relative brevity of the books facilitated DAW's release of the omnibus edition in 2000.

== Novels ==
=== Port Eternity ===
Port Eternity is a romantic thriller set aboard the space yacht Maid of Astolat, owned by an extremely wealthy woman. She, her current lover and her cloned Azi servants live out her fantasy, each representing a figure from the world of Arthurian legend. However, disaster strikes when the ship hits a knot in space-time and they are drawn into a parallel dimension. There they gravitate to a huge mass consisting of ships of various species which had been similarly trapped in the past. With no way back, they join the cobbled-together cosmopolitan society.

The story takes place in the Alliance–Union universe, in Union-side space. Cherryh originally named the story Involutions, because it "spirals in upon itself", but after discussing the title with her publisher, Wollheim's suggestion of Port Eternity was adopted.

Cherryh begins each chapter of the novel with a quote from Alfred Lord Tennyson's series of Arthurian poems Idylls of the King.

Cherryh was interviewed in May 1996 by Raymond H. Thompson but the interview did not get published until December 2010. Cherryh confirmed that the primary source for Port Eternity is Tennyson's Idylls of the King.

In the hardcover edition, the clones are mistakenly referred to as androids in the book's summary on the flaps of the dust-jacket.

=== Voyager in Night ===
Voyager in Night is about the Lindy, a small starship used for ore prospecting with a crew of three that collides with an ancient alien ship. But the crew of the alien ship are long dead; it is controlled by the ship's computers, which take the humans aboard and begin replicating and experimenting with them.

The story takes place in 2355–56 in the Alliance-Union universe near the newly constructed Endeavor Station in Union space.

Voyager in Night was a finalist in 1984 for a Philip K. Dick Award. Although clearly a science fiction story, it incorporates elements of the horror fiction genre.

=== Wave Without a Shore ===
Wave Without a Shore is an example of soft science fiction and is a philosophical story that takes place on the planet "Freedom" shared by humans and the alien "Ahnit" race which is native to the planet. Humans had been on Freedom for several hundred years and do not recognize the aliens, they do not see them, and instead use terms such as "invisibles" or "pilferage" when referring to the Ahnit.

This idyllic life is shattered when a student confronts the situation and begins consorting with the aliens. As the protagonist begins noticing the Ahnit and even trying to speak about them, he finds, unwillingly, that he too becomes unmentionable. The story is an allegory of race/class/caste relations in modern society with the themes explored including alienation, invisibility, and metaphysics.

== The Age of Exploration ==
Port Eternity and Voyager in Night are part of C. J. Cherryh's Age of Exploration series, a collection of three science fiction novels that share a common theme, but are unrelated to each other. The other novel is Cuckoo's Egg (1985).

== Sources ==
- Cherryh, C. J. Alternate Realities, DAW Books, 2000.
- Cherryh, C. J. Port Eternity, DAW Books, 1982.
- Cherryh, C. J. Voyager in Night, DAW Books, 1984.
- Cherryh, C. J. Wave Without a Shore, DAW Books, 1981.
