= The Faded Sun Trilogy =

Science fiction novel series by C. J. Cherryh

- The Faded Sun Trilogy omnibus edition cover
- The Faded Sun: Kesrith; The Faded Sun: Shon'jir; The Faded Sun: Kutath
- Author: C. J. Cherryh
- Country: United States
- Language: English
- Genre: Science fiction
- Publisher: DAW Books
- Published: 1978–1979

The Faded Sun trilogy is a series of science fiction novels by American writer C.J. Cherryh and set in her Alliance–Union universe. The series comprises the three novels The Faded Sun: Kesrith (1978), The Faded Sun: Shon'jir (1978), and The Faded Sun: Kutath (1979), published by DAW Books. They were republished as an omnibus edition in the UK in 1987 and in the U.S. in 2000.

== Overview ==
The series consists of some of the earliest of Cherryh's novels, featuring world-building and a number of alien species. The Faded Sun: Kesrith was nominated for the Nebula Award in 1978 and the Hugo Award in 1979 and was shortlisted for the Locus Awards in 1979. In addition, the other two books in the trilogy were independently longlisted for the Locus Award.

== Plot summary ==
The Faded Sun trilogy can be considered a Bildungsroman, since one of the major themes is the coming of age of Niun, the mri protagonist. At the same time, it is a story of acculturation, as the human protagonist, Sten Duncan, lives among the mri to the point of becoming one of them.

The Faded Sun trilogy is the principal account of the Mri Wars era of Cherryh's Alliance-Union universe. At the beginning of the first volume, the regul have just concluded a forty-year war with humanity. As part of the peace, they are ceding the desert world of Kesrith to humanity. However, they have neglected to inform its inhabitants, the mri, who have served them as mercenaries for over two thousand years.

The Mri have been nearly exterminated in these wars, and young Niun is one of the few remaining warriors. When the regul seek to double-cross his people, he and his sister Melein, the last of the priestly Sen caste, form an uneasy alliance with the human Sten Duncan to rescue a holy relic that may hold the key to the Mri's survival.

The second volume opens with Niun and Melein captives of the human occupation force, kept alive by the human medicine they would refuse if they were not sedated. But the human command has a plan that may thwart the regul's attempted genocide of the Mri. They produce a navigation tape from the data in the holy relic that legend holds leads the way to the Mri homeworld and set Niun and Melein aboard the ship. Duncan comes with them to keep the ship running.

Soon after they have left Kesrith, Melein lays down a mandate that nothing that is not mri can make the return to the ancient mri homeworld. As a result, Duncan must become Mri or die. With Niun as his teacher, Duncan learns the stern rules of the Mri warrior caste, the Kel. Retracing the voyages of the Mri takes years, jump after jump, giving Duncan time to become Mri. With each jump, they find evidence of previous Mri civilizations, each one destroyed, further and further back in time. Eventually, they realize that this is not the first time that the Mri have been almost exterminated; in fact, the entire Mri history has been made up of the Mri fighting as mercenaries for other races, then being turned upon once their usefulness has ended, as the race(s) employing the Mri did not wish the possibility that the Mri might go and work for their enemies and be used against their former employers.

When the ship lands on Kutath, the ancient homeworld of the mri, the three find other mri, the tribes who remained. They also discover that humans and Regul have followed their ship, and the Regul have not forgotten their determination to commit genocide. After an unprovoked attack, Duncan goes back to the human ship and slays the Regul Elder.

When the third volume begins, the regul are in a state of disarray as a result of the assassination. Duncan returns to the mri and joins them in seeking assistance from the Elee, the other surviving race of ancient Kutath. After a new Elder has risen among the regul, they renew their attack on the Mri. This time humanity acts to halt the genocide, breaking the cycle, and forming a new partnership with the Mri.

== Characters ==
- Niun, a Mri Kel'en
- Melein, his sister, a former Kel'e'en, now a Sen'e'en
- Intel, a She'pan of the Mri
- Eddan, Kel'anth of her edun
- Sathell S'Delas, Sen-anth of her edun
- George Stavros, human governor-to-be of Kesrith
- Sten Duncan, his aide
- Hulagh Alagn-ni, a Regul Elder of Doch Alagn
- Hada Surag-gi, a Regul youngling

== Cover artwork ==
The cover of the U.S. omnibus edition (pictured at top) re-uses the original cover art by Michael Whelan from the first paperback edition of Kutath (1980). The image is reversed in the omnibus edition, however, with the figures facing to the right instead of the left as in the original image.

== Publication information ==
=== Initial serialized publication ===
The Faded Sun: Kesrith was first published as a 4-part serial starting in February 1978 in Galaxy Science Fiction (Volume 39, Nos 2-5).

==== Individual novels ====
- The Faded Sun: Kesrith, DAW Books, (1978)
- The Faded Sun: Shon'jir, DAW Books, (1978)
- The Faded Sun: Kutath, DAW Books, (1979)

==== Omnibuses ====
- The Faded Sun Trilogy, (UK), Methuen, (1987)
- The Faded Sun Trilogy, (US), DAW Books, (2000)
