= The Scapegoat (Cherryh novel) =

1985 novella by C. J. Cherryh

- Short story by C. J. Cherryh
- Language: English
- Genre: Science fiction

Publication
- Published in: Alien Stars
- Publisher: Baen Books
- Publication date: 1985
- Publication place: United States
- Media type: Print (hardcover)

The novella was first published in the anthology Alien Stars (Baen Books, 1985).

"The Scapegoat" is a science fiction novella by American writer C. J. Cherryh, set in her Alliance-Union universe. It deals with a war in which the two opposing species can not communicate with one another and do not know how to stop the conflict. The work was originally published in the 1985 anthology of military science fiction Alien Stars and was nominated for the Hugo Award for Best Novella.

== Plot summary ==
An unarmed human starship and its crew of fifteen hundred are destroyed by a technologically less advanced alien race, later called elves by the humans because of their resemblance to the mythical creatures. Other unprovoked attacks follow. All negotiation attempts fail; the elves fire without communication. Eventually, the overmatched enemy is driven back to his home world, but the conflict does not cease. The Alliance, one of the three human power blocs, ends up mired in a twenty-year-long war.

In all that time, humans get no closer to understanding why the elves fight or how to make peace. A few districts remain puzzlingly neutral, but when humans try to establish relations with one of them, it instantly joins the enemy side. In addition, not a single elf is captured alive; except for the very young, as they have the ability to stop their hearts at will.

Then one day, Second Lieutenant John DeFranco takes a prisoner, who deliberately allows himself to be captured. The creature speaks English, learned from a human prisoner, and calls himself the saitas. He tells DeFranco he has come to try to end the war. The elf is passed along to Alliance scientists, but would not communicate with them. He asks to speak to DeFranco.

As they talk, DeFranco learns that the elves do not comprehend the concept of a treaty, written down on a piece of paper, and do not trust it; their way of thinking is too alien. The saitas explains that he has come to be killed, so that his death will carry away the mistakes of the war. He is willing to sign a human treaty, but the elves require a human saitas. The elf hopes that DeFranco will be that one. Meanwhile, all along the front, the elves attack with the little they have left. One of DeFranco's friends becomes a casualty.

When DeFranco realizes what the prisoner wants, he tries to leave, but the meeting place has been locked from the outside by his commanders and a grenade pointedly left inside. In the end, DeFranco finds it within himself to join the saitas in completing his mission. When the recording of their deaths is broadcast, the fighting ends. An elvish delegation arrives and takes away DeFranco's body for burial. The humans in turn take the elf's body to be interred on Downbelow, the Alliance world.

== See also ==
- The Forever War, an award-winning novel with a similar theme of profound misunderstanding between species.
