= Gate of Ivrel =

1976 novel by C. J. Cherryh

- First edition
- Author: C. J. Cherryh
- Cover artist: Michael Whelan
- Language: English
- Series: The Morgaine Stories
- Genre: Fantasy
- Publisher: DAW Books
- Publication date: March 1976
- Publication place: United States
- Media type: Print (paperback)
- ISBN: 0-88677-257-5
- Followed by: Well of Shiuan (1978)

Gate of Ivrel is a 1976 novel by American writer C. J. Cherryh, her first published work. It is the first of four books composing the Morgaine Stories, chronicling the deeds of Morgaine, a woman consumed by a mission of the utmost importance, and her chance-met companion, Nhi Vanye i Chya.

Cherryh lists it on her website as a fantasy novel, and noted author Andre Norton agreed with her. Others, however, classify it as science fiction or science fantasy.

== Plot summary ==
The pre-technological land of Andur-Kursh is fought over by rival clans, among them the Nhi and the Chya. Vanye is the despised bastard son of a Nhi lord and a Chya captive. One day, he kills one legitimate half-brother and maims the other after being baited.

Exiled for his crimes, Vanye inadvertently frees Morgaine, a beautiful woman whom he recognizes as a legend from the past. Morgaine had been trapped in stasis for a century in one of the many "Gates" (passageways through space and time) which dot the land. By age-old custom, she claims a year of service from him for his acceptance of her food and shelter.

Morgaine explains that she is on a mission to close the Gates, as the misuse of their powers has destroyed entire civilizations in the past. The rest of her group were betrayed while attempting to attack this planet's master Gate at Ivrel, controlled by Thiye. Only Morgaine and a few soldiers escaped. Pursued, she fled into a lesser Gate.

She seeks aid from Clan Leth, but its lord, Kasedre, is half mad. His chief counselor, Liell, warns them to leave, killing a guard to leave them no choice.

Morgaine and Vanye become uneasy guests of Roh, Vanye's cousin and lord of the Chya. After questioning, they are let go, only to be attacked by Thiye's men. Morgaine draws her sword, Changeling, which can tap the power of the Gates to send its victims to another place and time. The two escape, but run into Vanye's people. She is set free, though without her sword, while Vanye is forced to remain behind by his half-brother Erij, who wants Vanye to help him rule their land. When persuasion and threats alike prove useless, he draws Changeling, not knowing its powers. Vanye uses the ensuing mayhem to retrieve the dropped sword and rejoin Morgaine.

Roh warns him not to trust Liell, whose body is rumored to have been taken over by another. Morgaine confirms this can be done using a Gate. Thiye has extended his life this way, and Morgaine suspects her betrayer has also.

After another clash with Nhi warriors, Morgaine and Vanye are personally escorted by Roh out of his domain. Liell and his men capture all three. Liell takes Vanye to a Gate to switch bodies. Vanye escapes, stealing a horse which is carrying Changeling, but is recaptured by Erij.

Erij, emboldened by his possession of Changeling, attacks Ivrel. After driving off Liell's men with the sword, the pair breach Thiye's fortress. Vanye surprises Erij and retakes Morgaine's sword. Inside, they come upon the aged Thiye, but Roh kills him. Roh tells them that Morgaine is loose and that Liell is dead. He then flees.

Vanye finds Morgaine and gives her the sword. She tells Vanye that Liell has taken possession of Roh's body in his place. Roh/Liell has set the controls to shut down all the Gates very soon. He hopes to escape to another planet, leaving his enemies trapped here. Morgaine sets off in pursuit. Erij allows Vanye to follow. Together, Morgaine and Vanye pass through the Gate before it closes forever.

== Characters ==
- Morgaine, a woman driven by an impossible mission
- Nhi Vanye i Chya, an outcast warrior
- Nhi Erij, Vanye's half-brother
- Chya Liell, a counselor in Leth
- Leth Kasedre, lord of Leth
- Chya Roh, lord of Chya
- Thiye Thiye's-son

== Reviews ==
Andre Norton praised the novel highly, writing that:

... never since reading The Lord of the Rings have I been caught up in any tale as I have been in Gate of Ivrel. I do not know the author, but her talent is one I must envy. She has drawn an entirely believable hero on an alien and enchanting world, working in bits of customs, beliefs, and history so cleverly that it now certainly exists-somewhere.

Fellow fantasy and science fiction author Jo Walton found all four books in the series to be "too grim. They're good, but they're unrelievedly dark."

== Publication history ==
- Gate of Ivrel. DAW Books, 1976. ISBN 0-88677-257-5.
- The Book of Morgaine (omnibus). Nelson Doubleday/Science Fiction Book Club, 1979.

Reissued as:
- The Chronicles of Morgaine. Methuen Publishing, 1985 and 1987. ISBN 0-413-56290-5.
- The Chronicles of Morgaine. Mandarin, 1989 and 1990 ISBN 0-7493-0007-8.

- The Complete Morgaine (omnibus). DAW Books, 2015 ISBN 978-0-7564-1123-7.
