= C. J. Cherryh =

American speculative fiction author (born 1942)

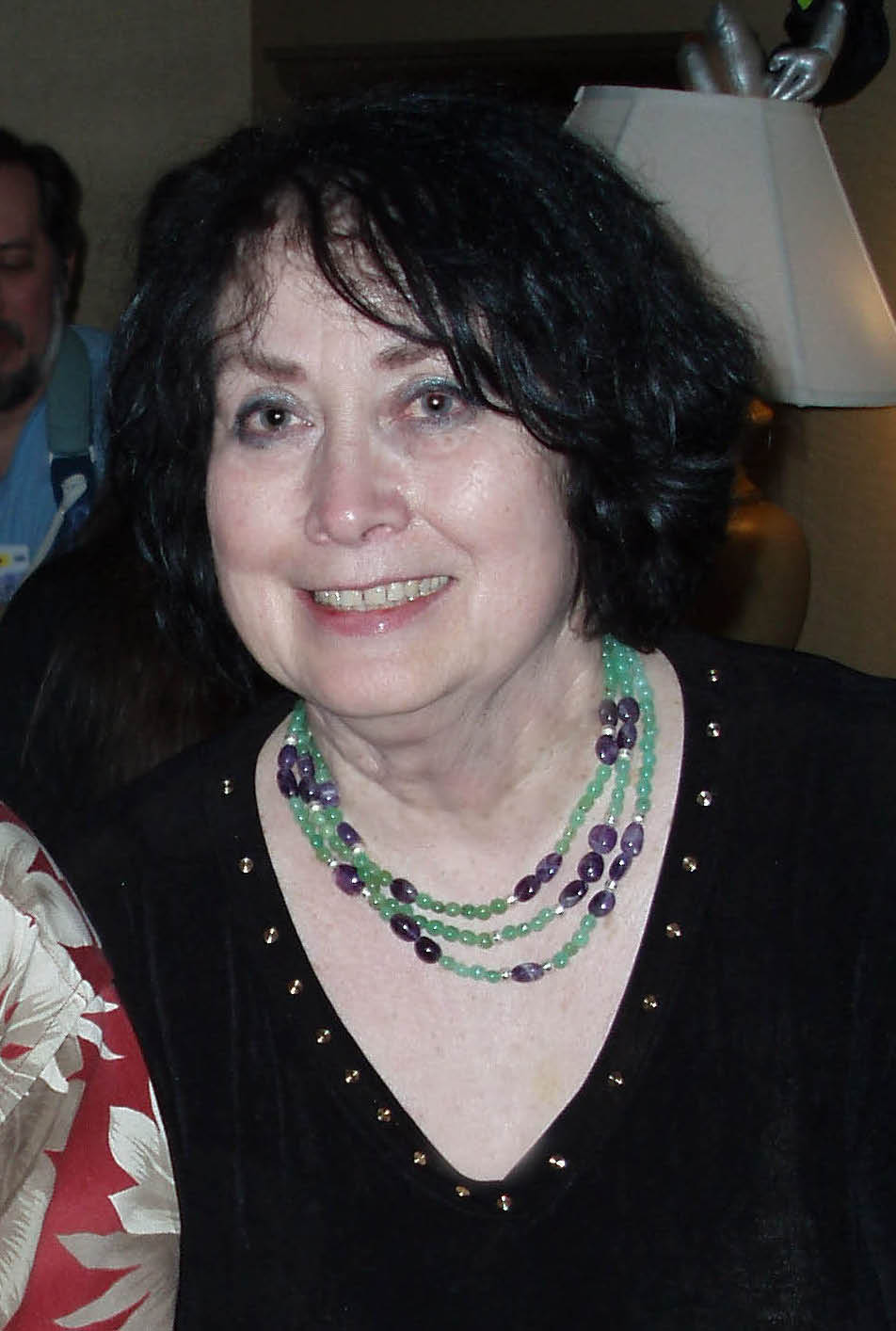
- Cherryh at NorWesCon in 2006
- Born: Carolyn Janice Cherry; September 1, 1942 (age 84); St. Louis, Missouri, U.S.
- Education: University of Oklahoma (BA); Johns Hopkins University (MA)
- Occupations: Novelist, short story author, essayist, high school teacher
- Spouse: Jane Fancher (m. 2014)
- Relatives: David A. Cherry (brother)
- Writing career
- Pen name: C. J. Cherryh
- Period: 1976–2026
- Genres: Science fiction, fantasy
- Notable works: Alliance–Union universe, Foreigner series
- Notable awards: Hugo Award, Locus Award, Prometheus Award
- Website: cherryh.com/WaveWithoutAShore/

Carolyn Janice Cherry (born September 1, 1942), better known by the pen name C. J. Cherryh, is an American writer of speculative fiction. She has written more than 80 books since the mid-1970s, including the Hugo Award-winning novels Downbelow Station (1981) and Cyteen (1988), both set in her Alliance–Union universe, and her Foreigner series. She is known for worldbuilding, depicting fictional realms with great realism supported by vast research in history, language, psychology, and archeology.

Cherryh (pronounced "Cherry") appended a silent "h" to her real name because editor Donald A. Wollheim felt "Cherry" sounded too much like a romance writer. She used only her initials, C. J., to disguise that she was female at a time when the majority of science fiction authors were male.

== Biography ==
Cherryh was born in 1942 in St. Louis, Missouri and raised primarily in Lawton, Oklahoma. She began writing stories at the age of ten when she became frustrated with the cancellation of her favorite TV show, Flash Gordon. In 1964, she received a Bachelor of Arts degree in Latin from the University of Oklahoma (Phi Beta Kappa), with academic specializations in archaeology, mythology, and the history of engineering. In 1965, she received a Master of Arts degree in classics from Johns Hopkins University in Baltimore, Maryland, where she was a Woodrow Wilson fellow. In the early 1980s, she was an artist in residence at the University of Central Oklahoma.

After graduation, Cherryh taught Latin, Ancient Greek, the classics, and ancient history at John Marshall High School in the Oklahoma City public school system. While her job was teaching Latin, her passion was the history, religion, and culture of Rome and Ancient Greece. During the summers, she would conduct student tours of the ancient ruins in England, France, Spain, and Italy. In her spare time, she would write, using the mythology of Rome and Greece as plots for her stories of the future. Cherryh did not follow the professional path typical of science fiction writers at the time, which was to first publish short stories in science fiction and fantasy magazines and then progress to novels; she did not consider writing short stories until she had had several novels published.

Cherryh wrote novels in her spare time away from teaching and submitted these manuscripts directly for publication. Initially, she met with little success; various publishers lost manuscripts she had submitted. She was thus forced to retype them from her own carbon copies, time-consuming but cheaper than paying for photocopying. (Using carbon paper to make at least one copy of a manuscript was standard practice until the advent of the personal computer.)

Cherryh's breakthrough came in 1975 when Donald A. Wollheim purchased the two manuscripts she had submitted to DAW Books, Gate of Ivrel and Brothers of Earth. About the former, Cherryh stated in an interview on Amazing Stories:

It was the first time a book really found an ending and really worked, because I had made contact with Don Wollheim at DAW, found him interested, and was able to write for a specific editor whose body of work and type of story I knew. It was a good match. It was a set of characters I'd invented when I was, oh, about thirteen. So it was an old favorite of my untold stories, and ended up being the first in print.

The two novels were published in 1976, Gate of Ivrel preceding Brothers of Earth by several months (although she had completed and submitted Brothers of Earth first). The books won her immediate recognition and the John W. Campbell Award for Best New Writer in 1977.

Although not all of her works have been published by DAW Books, during this early period Cherryh developed a strong relationship with the Wollheim family and their publishing company, frequently travelling to New York City and staying with the Wollheims in their Queens family home. Other companies who have published her novels include Baen Books, HarperCollins, Warner Books, and Random House (under its Del Rey Books imprint). She published six additional novels in the late 1970s.

In 1979, her short story "Cassandra" won the Best Short Story Hugo, and she quit teaching to write full-time. She has since won the Hugo Award for Best Novel twice, first for Downbelow Station in 1982 and then again for Cyteen in 1989.

In addition to developing her own fictional universes, Cherryh has contributed to several shared world anthologies, including Thieves' World, Heroes in Hell, Elfquest, Witch World, Magic in Ithkar, and the Merovingen Nights series, which she edited. Her writing has encompassed a variety of science fiction and fantasy subgenres and includes a few short works of non-fiction. Her books have been translated into Croatian, Czech, Dutch, French, German, Hebrew, Hungarian, Italian, Japanese, Latvian, Lithuanian, Polish, Portuguese, Romanian, Russian, Slovak, Spanish, and Swedish. She has also translated several published works of fiction from French into English.

She now lives near Spokane, Washington with her wife, the science fiction/fantasy author and artist Jane Fancher. She enjoys skating and travelling and regularly makes appearances at science fiction conventions.

Her brother David A. Cherry is a science fiction and fantasy artist.

Cherryh announced her retirement from writing in April 2026, due to ongoing health issues.

== Writing style ==
Cherryh uses a writing technique she has variously labeled "very tight limited third person", "intense third person", and "intense internal" voice. In this approach, the only things the writer narrates are those that the viewpoint character specifically notices or thinks about. The narration may not mention important features of the environment or situation with which the character is already familiar, even though these things might be of interest to the reader, because the character does not think about them owing to their familiarity.

== Worldbuilding ==
Cherryh's works depict fictional worlds with great realism supported by her strong background in languages, history, archaeology, and psychology. In her introduction to Cherryh's first book, Andre Norton compared the effect of the work to Tolkien's: "Never since reading The Lord of the Rings have I been so caught up in any tale as I have been in Gate of Ivrel." Another reviewer commented, "Her blend of science and folklore gives the novels an intellectual depth comparable to Tolkien or Gene Wolfe." Cherryh creates believable alien cultures, species, and perspectives, causing the reader to reconsider basic assumptions about human nature. Her worlds have been praised as complex and realistic because she presents them through implication rather than explication. She describes the difficulties of translating/expressing concepts between differing languages. This is best demonstrated in both the Chanur and Foreigner series.

She has described the process she uses to create alien societies for her fiction as being akin to asking a series of questions, and letting the answers to these questions dictate various parameters of the alien culture. In her view, "culture is how biology responds to its environment and makes its living conditions better." Some of the issues she considers critical to take into account in detailing an intelligent alien race are:

- The physical environment in which the species lives
- The location and nature of the race's dwellings, including the spatial relationships between those dwellings
- The species' diet, method(s) of obtaining and consuming food, and cultural practices regarding the preparation of meals and eating (if any)
- Processes which the aliens use to share knowledge
- Customs and ideas regarding death, dying, the treatment of the race's dead, and the afterlife (if any)
- Metaphysical issues related to self-definition and the aliens' concept of the fictional universe they inhabit

In a 2005 interview, the interviewer asks Cherryh, “How much science is there in science fiction?” Cherryh responds with “Quite a bit and if I get something wrong, I know I’m going to hear about it.” (Minute 2:15) She later states, “I’ve had operational conferences with astronauts.” (Minute 3:03)

== Major themes ==
Her protagonists often attempt to uphold existing social institutions and norms in the service of the greater good while the antagonists often attempt to exploit, subvert or radically alter the predominant social order for selfish gain. She uses the theme of the outsider finding his (or her) place in society and how individuals interact with The Other. A number of Cherryh's novels focus on military and political themes. One underlying theme of her work is an exploration of gender roles. Her characters reveal both strengths and weaknesses regardless of their gender, although her female protagonists are portrayed as especially capable and determined, and many of her male characters are portrayed as damaged, abused, or otherwise vulnerable.

== Works ==
Her career began with publication of her first books in 1976, Gate of Ivrel and Brothers of Earth. Since that time, she has published over 80 novels, short-story compilations, with continuing production as her blog attests. Cherryh has received the Hugo, Locus, and Prometheus Awards for some of her novels. Her novels are divided into various spheres, focusing mostly around the Alliance–Union universe, The Chanur novels, the Foreigner series, and her fantasy novels.

== Scholarship ==
- The Cherryh Odyssey (2004, ISBN 0-8095-1070-7; ISBN 0-8095-1071-5), edited by Edward Carmien, compiles a dozen essays by academic and professional voices discussing the literary life and career of Cherryh. A bibliography is included.
- The Jack Williamson Science Fiction Library at Eastern New Mexico University contains a collection of Cherryh's manuscripts and notes for scholarly research.
- Military Command in Women's Science Fiction: C.J. Cherryh's Signy Mallory (2000), Part 1, Part 2 by Camille Bacon-Smith.
- "Animal Transference: A 'Mole-like Progression' in C.J. Cherry" (2011) by Lynn Turner, in Mosaic: a journal for the interdisciplinary study of literature, 44.3, pp. 163–175.

== Awards and honors ==
| Award | Category | Work | Result |
|---|---|---|---|
| British SF Award | Novel | Cyteen (1988) | Nominated |
| Hugo Award | Novel | The Faded Sun: Kesrith (1978) | Nominated |
| Hugo Award | Novel | Downbelow Station (1981) | Won |
| Hugo Award | Novel | The Pride of Chanur (1982) | Nominated |
| Hugo Award | Novel | Cuckoo's Egg (1985) | Nominated |
| Hugo Award | Novel | Cyteen (1988) | Won |
| Hugo Award | Novella | "The Scapegoat" (1985) | Nominated |
| Hugo Award | Short Story | "Cassandra" (1978) | Won |
| Locus Award | Novel | The Faded Sun: Kesrith (1978) | Nominated |
| Locus Award | Fantasy Novel | The Paladin (1988) | Nominated |
| Locus Award | Fantasy Novel | Rusalka (1989) | Nominated |
| Locus Award | Fantasy Novel | Fortress of Eagles (1998) | Nominated |
| Locus Award | Fantasy Novel | Fortress of Owls (1999) | Nominated |
| Locus Award | SF Novel | The Pride of Chanur (1982) | Nominated |
| Locus Award | SF Novel | Chanur's Venture (1984) | Nominated |
| Locus Award | SF Novel | Cyteen (1988) | Won |
| Locus Award | SF Novel | Rimrunners (1989) | Nominated |
| Locus Award | SF Novel | Foreigner (1994) | Nominated |
| Locus Award | SF Novel | Invader (1995) | Nominated |
| Locus Award | SF Novel | Finity's End (1997) | Nominated |
| Locus Award | SF Novel | Defender (2001) | Nominated |
| Locus Award | SF Novel | Visitor (2016) | Nominated |
| Locus Award | Collection | Sunfall (1981) | Nominated |
| Locus Award | Collection | Visible Light (1986) | Nominated |
| Locus Award | Novella | "Ealdwood" (1981) | Nominated |
| Locus Award | Novella | The Scapegoat (1984) | Nominated |
| Locus Award | Novelette | "The Haunted Tower" (1981) | Nominated |
| Locus Award | Novelette | "Willow" (1982) | Nominated |
| Locus Award | Short Story | "The Only Death in the City" (1981) | Nominated |
| Nebula Award | Novel | The Faded Sun: Kesrith (1978) | Nominated |
| Nebula Award | Short Story | "Cassandra" (1978) | Nominated |
| World Fantasy Award | Novella | "Ealdwood" (1981) | Nominated |
| World Fantasy Award | Novella | "Gwydion and the Dragon" (1991) | Nominated |
| Prometheus Award | Novel | Finity's End (1981) | Nominated |
| Prometheus Award | Novel | Alliance Rising (2020) | Won |
| Prometheus Award | Novel | Alliance Unbound (2024) | Nominated |

Cherryh has also received the following honors:

- John W. Campbell Award for Best New Writer – 1977
- NESFA Edward E. Smith Memorial Award (The Skylark) – 1988
- Guest of Honor at BucConeer, the 1998 World Science Fiction Convention in Baltimore
- Asteroid 77185 Cherryh, discovered March 20, 2001 and named in her honor.
- Oklahoma Book Awards – Arrell Gibson Lifetime Achievement Award 2005
- Guest of Honor at FenCon IX in Dallas/Fort Worth on September 21–23, 2012.
- SFWA Damon Knight Memorial Grand Master Award – 2016
- Robert A. Heinlein Award – 2021
- LASFS Forry Lifetime Achievement Award – 2025
- The asteroid 77185 Cherryh is named in the author's honor. The asteroid's discoverers wrote of Cherryh: "She has challenged us to be worthy of the stars by imagining how mankind might grow to live among them."

== Organizations ==
- Swordsmen and Sorcerers' Guild of America (SAGA) – member (granted for her "Morgaine" novels)
- National Space Society – seat on the Board of Advisors
- Endangered Language Fund – seat on the Board of Directors
