= Supernatural beings in Slavic religion =

Slavic mythology

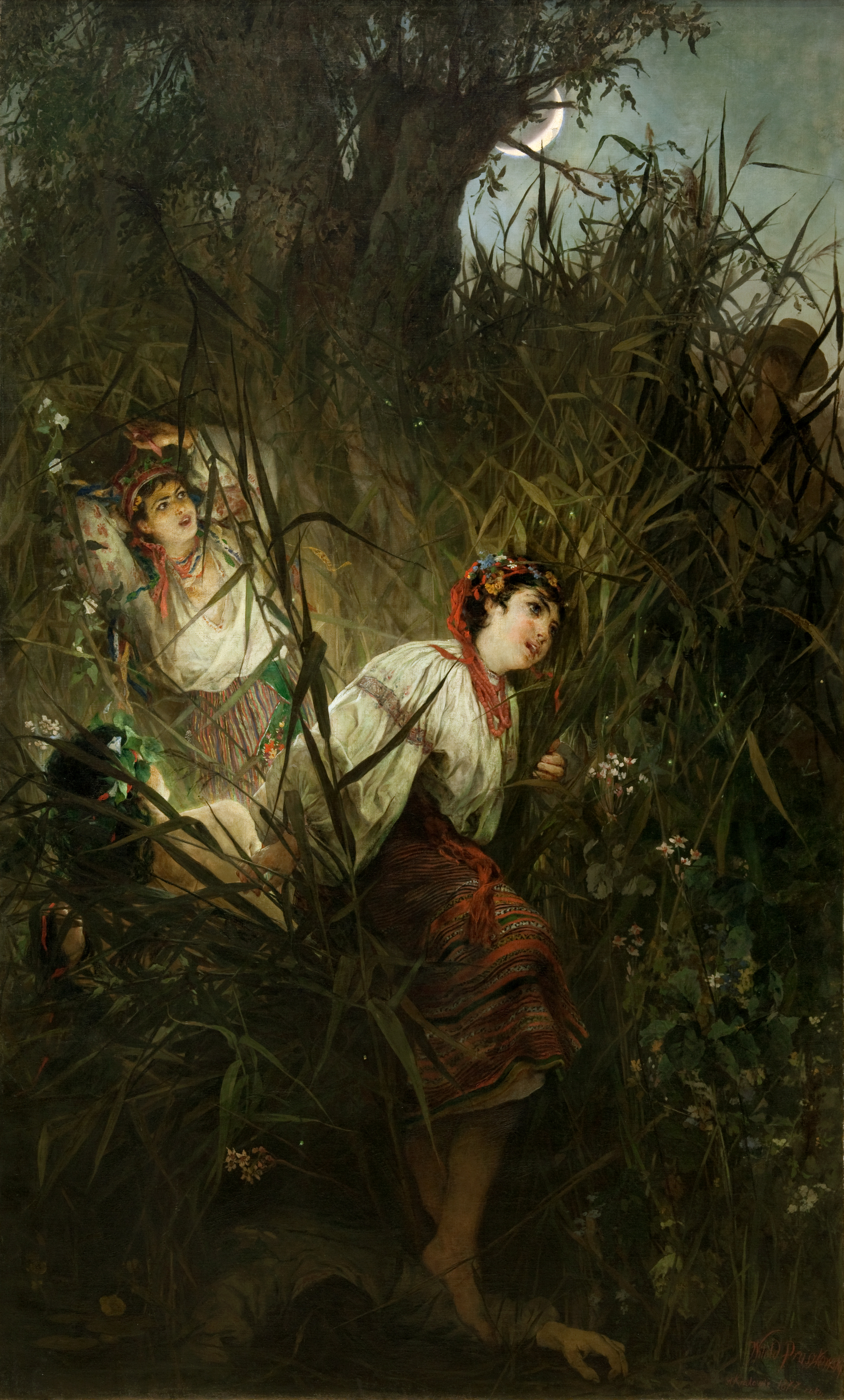
Rusałki (1877), by Witold Pruszkowski

Other than the many gods and goddesses of the Slavs, the ancient Slavs believed in and revered many supernatural beings that existed in nature. These supernatural beings in Slavic religion come in various forms, and the same name of any single being can be spelled or transliterated differently according to language and transliteration system.

== Vila ==
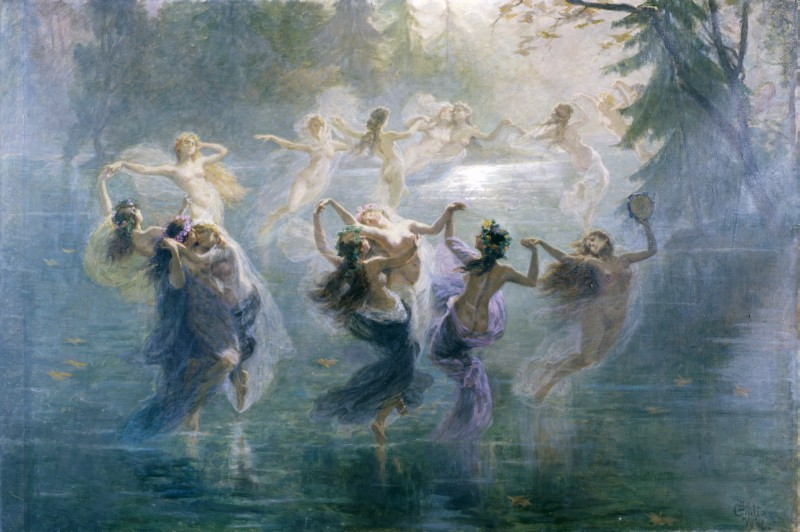
Vilas (Le Villi, 1906) as represented by Bartolomeo Giuliano.

Vila (pl. vile, Slovak/Czech víly) is a fairy that is similar to a nymph, identified as a nymph by the Greek historian Procopius; their name comes from the same root as the name of Veles. They are described as beautiful, eternally young, dressed in white, with eyes flashing like thunder, and provided with wings, and blonde hair. They live in the clouds, in mountain woods or in the waters. They are well-disposed towards men, and can turn themselves into horses, wolves, snakes, falcons and swans. The cult of the Vilas was still practised among South Slavs in the early twentieth century, with offerings of fruits and flowers in caves, cakes near wells, and ribbons hung from the branches of trees.

== Rusalka ==
In Slavic mythology, Rusalka is a water nymph, a female spirit who lives in rivers. In most versions, rusalka is an unquiet being who is no longer alive, associated with the unclean spirit (Nav) and dangerous. According to Dmitry Zelenin, people who die violently and before their time, such as young women who commit suicide because they have been jilted by their lovers, or unmarried women who are pregnant out of wedlock, must live out their designated time on earth as a spirit. Another theory is that rusalki are the female spirits of the unclean dead; this includes suicides, unbaptised babies, and those who die without last rites. (Under this theory, male unclean dead were said to become vodyanoy.)

== Vodyanoy, Vodník ==
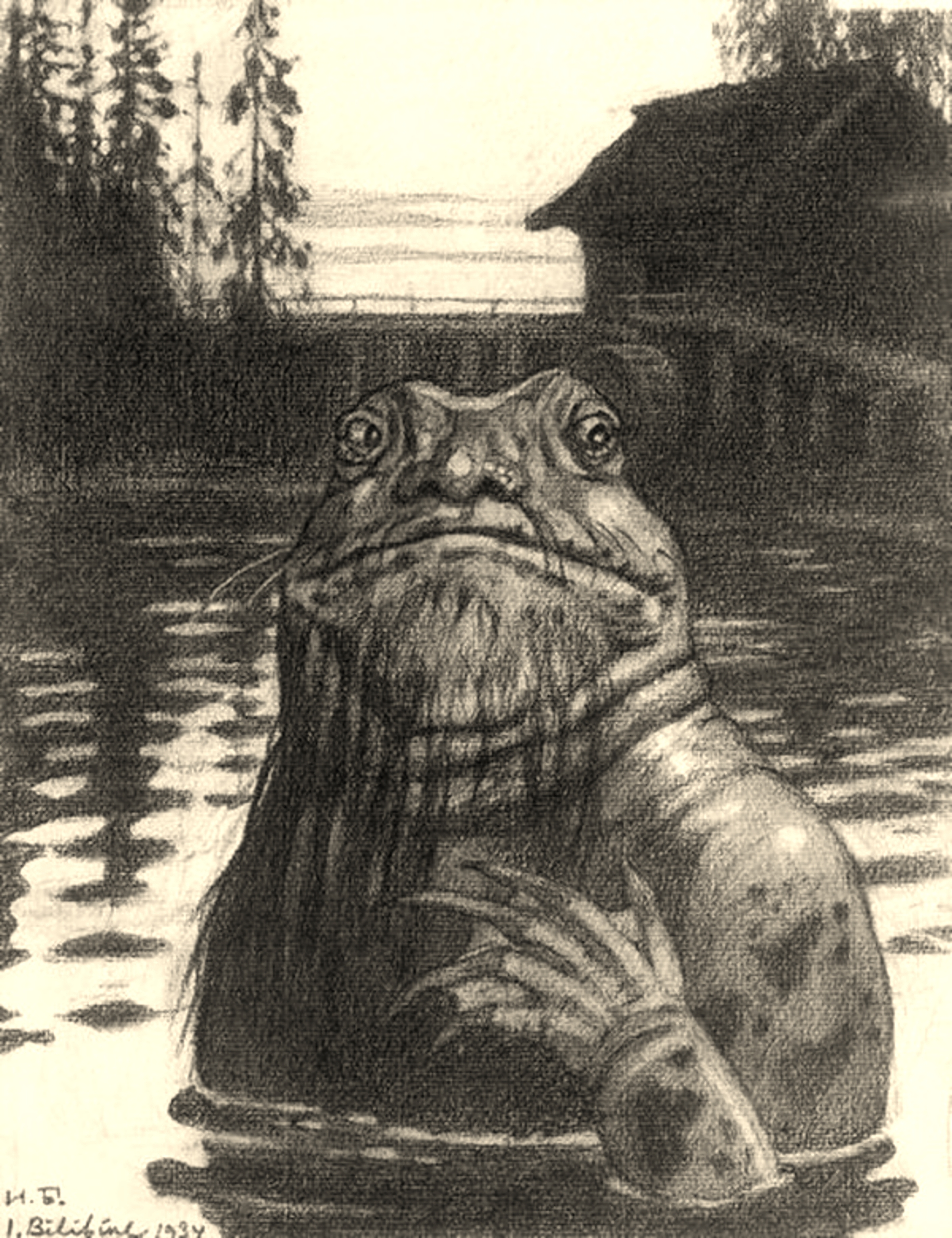
Vodyanoy by Ivan Bilibin, 1934

The vodyanoy is a male water spirit of Slavic origin. The Czech and Slovak equivalent is called a vodník, Polish is a wodnik, in Russian it is vodyanoy and vodyanyk in Ukrainian. A South Slavic equivalent is vodenjak. He is viewed to be particularly malevolent, existing almost exclusively to drown swimmers who have angered him by their boldness. Reports of his appearance vary; some tales define him as a naked old man, bloated and hairy, covered in slime, covered in scales, or simply as an old peasant with a red shirt and beard. He is also reported to have the ability to transform into a fish.

The vodyanoy lives in deep pools, often by a mill, and is said to be the spirit of unclean male death (this definition includes those who have committed suicide, unbaptized children, and those who die without last rites). As previously stated, the vodyanoy would drown those who angered him with boasts or insults. However, there was no certain protection, as the spirit was particularly capricious. Peasants feared the vodyanoy and would often attempt to get rid of the spirit or, failing that, appease him.

The only people who were generally safe from the vodyanoy's anger were millers and fishermen. Millers, in particular, were viewed to be so close to the vodyanoy that they often became seen as sorcerous figures. This may be influenced by the belief that millers yearly drown a drunk passerby as an offering to the vodyanoy. Fishermen were somewhat less suspect, offering only the first of their catch with an incantation. If a vodyanoy favored a fisherman, he would herd fish into the nets.

== Bereginya ==
Bereginyas (Russian), Berehynias (Ukrainian) or Brzeginias/Brzeginkas (Polish) are obscure fairies mentioned in "The Lay of St. Gregory the Theologian of the Idols", which has been preserved in a 15th-century Novgorod manuscript. "The Lay" is a compilation of translations from Greek sources studded with comments by a 12th-century Kievan monk. The text, which seems to have been considerably revised by later scribes, does mention "vampires and bereginyas" as the earliest creatures worshipped by the Slavs, even before the cult of Perun was introduced in their lands. No detail about "bereginyas" are given, affording a large field for speculations of every kind.

Boris Rybakov connects the term with the Slavic word for "riverbank" and reasons that the term referred to Slavic mermaids, although, unlike rusalkas, they were benevolent in nature. The scholar identifies the worship of vampires and bereginyas as a form of "dualistic animism" practiced by the Slavs in the most ancient period of their history. According to him, the term was replaced by "rusalka" in most areas, surviving into the 20th century only in the Russian North. After the publication of Rybakov's research, the "bereginya" has become a popular concept with Slavic neo-pagans who conceive of it as a powerful pagan goddess rather than a mere water sprite.

== Modern fiction ==
- The Winternight trilogy, by Katherine Arden, is inspired by Slavic mythology and includes many characters, such as the Domovoy, the Rusalka and other beings.
- In Edward Fallon's second book in his Linger series of novels, Trail of the Beast, a rusalka taunts a trio hunting a serial killer.
- C. J. Cherryh has written three novels, Rusalka, Chernevog and Yvgenie, set in a world inspired by Russian folktales that feature, amongst others, rusalka, vodyanoy, and leshy.
- In Changes, a novel in the Dresden Files series by Jim Butcher, the fairy Toot-Toot, a Polevoi, is enraged when he is mistakenly called a Domovoy by Sanya, the Russian Knight of the Cross.
- The videogame Quest For Glory IV: Shadows of Darkness, set in the Slavic countryside of a fictional east-European valley, features several Slavic fairies, including the Rusalka, Domovoy, and Leshy.
- Catherynne Valente's novel Deathless is set in a fantasy version of Stalinist Russia and features vila, rusalka, leshy, and other Slavic fairies.
- Dorothy Dreyer's Reaper's Rite series depicts Vila as magical beings of half-faery, half-witch origin.
- In J. K. Rowling's novel Harry Potter and the Goblet of Fire, Veela are the mascots of the Bulgarian Quidditch Team at the World Cup. Fleur Delacour's grandmother was a Veela and Fleur's wand contains a strand of a veela hair.
- Piers Anthony's Xanth novels include a few Vily, as nature spirits bound to a tree (similar to a dryad) with powers of shapeshifting and cleansing or poisoning water, and extremely quick to anger.
- Andrzej Sapkowski's Wiedźmin series as well as the Witcher video games based on it are set in a medieval Slavic fantasy world. Many of the monsters are taken directly from or inspired by Slavic mythology, such as the rusalka, the striga, and the vodyanoi.
- Alicia Jasinka’s novel This Fatal Kiss is set in a Slavic town, and is heavily inspired by Slavic folklore. The main character is a rusalka, among other spirit characters.
- The video game Genshin Impact features several spirits taken from Slavic folklore in the fictional nation of Snezhnaya, such as the domovoy, rusalka, vila, and other Slavic fairies.

== Mythical characters, spirits, and creatures ==
As is common in folklore, there is no standard set of characteristics, or names, and spirits or magical creatures are referred to by many names, often identifying their function or the place or environment of their activity. Such descriptive terms include:

Tutelary deity

- Bannik (banya, sauna)
- Bolotnik (swamp)
- Dvorovoy (yard, land)
- Leshy (forest)
- Sea Tsar (sea)
- Mermaid (sea)
- Moryana (Caspian Sea)
- Ovinnik (barn)
- Polevik (field in agriculture)
- The Mistress of the Copper Mountain (ore, Ural)
- Shubin (coal, Donbas)
- Vodyanoy (lake, river)

Spirits of Atmosphere

- Moroz (mythology) (frost)
- Vedogon (spirit-guardian of a sleeping person)
- Vikhor (wind, whirlwind)
- Zduhać (protector from bad weather)

Spirits of the time of day

- Babay (night)
- Poludnitsa (noon)
- Nocnitsa (night)
- Zorya (morning)

Spirits of the sky

- Dennitsa (morning star) ≈ Danica (mythology)
- Vechernitsa (evening star)

Spirit of Fate

- Dola (destiny fortune)
- Likho (misfortune)
- Narecnitsi, or Rodjenice, Sudjenice (parcae)

Nav

- Drekavac (nav of the South Slavs)
- Kikimora (harmful domestic female spirit)
- Mavka (evil spirits, rusalkas)
- Rusalka (the harmful spirit that appears in the summer in the grass field, in the forest, near the water)
- Samovila (a female spirit inhabiting the mountains and owning wells and lakes)
- Samodiva
- Upyr (vampire)

Devilry (evil power)

- Bies
- Chort
- Chuhaister
- Korov'ya smert' (Cow's death)
- Kallikantzaros
- Talasum
- Likhoradka
- Shishiga
- Zlydzens

Ritual characters

- Berehynia (East Slavic mythology female character)
- Baba Marta (mythical female character in Bulgarian folklore, associated with the month of March. Martenitsa)
- Božić (Christmas holiday near the southern Slavs)
- Dodola (in the Balkan tradition, the spring-summer rite of causing rain, as well as the central character of this rite)
- German (ritual doll and the name of the rite of calling out rain of the southern Slavs)
- Jarilo (personification of one of the summer holidays in the Russian folk calendar)
- Koliada (the personification of the New Year's cycle)
- Kostroma (spring-summer ritual character in traditional Russian culture)
- Kupala (folklore character of the Eastern Slavs, the personification of the holiday of Kupala Night)
- Marzanna (the female mythological character associated with the seasonal rituals of dying and the resurrection of nature)
- Maslenitsa (folklore character of the Eastern Slavs, the personification of the holiday of Maslenitsa)

== See also ==
- Mermaid
- Naiad
- Nix (or Nyx)
- Nymph
- Samodiva
- Water sprite
- Czech folklore
- Werewolf in Slavic mythology
