= Water spirit =

Elemental spirit associated with water

A water spirit is a kind of supernatural being found in the folklore of many cultures. The following is a list of water spirits:

== African ==
Some water spirits in traditional African religion include:

- Mami Wata is a transcultural pantheon of water spirits and deities of the African diaspora. For the many names associated with Mami Wata spirits and goddess, see Names of Mami Wata.
- Owu Mmiri of some riverine people of Nigeria are often described as mermaid-like spirit of water.
- A jengu (plural miengu) is a water spirit in the traditional beliefs of the Sawa ethnic groups of Cameroon, particularly the Duala, Bakweri, and related Sawa peoples. Among the Bakweri, the name is liengu (plural: maengu).
- A simbi is a mermaid-like or reptilian spirits from Kongo tribe and related to Vaudou religion.
- El Naddaha is an Egyptian female spirit who calls men to the Nile, leading to their death or disappearance.
- In Ndau witchcraft and sorcery, traditional healers (n'anga) pray to Zvipunha (rain spirits) or nzuzu (a mermaid-like water spirit) to manipulate the weather during floods or drought.

== Australasia ==
- The Yawkyawk is a mythological female water spirit of Western Arnhem Land, Australia. It possesses a female head and torso but with scales on the abdomen, and possessing a fish tail. The word Yawkyawk means "young woman" or "young woman spirit being" in the Kunwinjku language.
- In the Māori mythology of New Zealand, the Taniwha are large supernatural beings that live in deep pools in rivers, dark caves, or in the sea especially in places with dangerous currents or deceptive breakers (giant waves).

== Celtic ==
In Celtic mythology:

- An each uisge is a particularly dangerous "water horse" supposed to be found in Scotland; its Irish counterpart is the Aughisky.
- The Gwragedd Annwn are female Welsh lake fairies of great beauty.
- A kelpie is a less dangerous sort of water horse. There are many similar creatures by other names in the mythology including:
  - the tangie (Orkney and Shetland)
  - the Blue men of the Minch ("na fir ghorma": Scottish Gaelic pronunciation: [nə fiɾʲ ˈɣɔɾɔmə]) (The Minch)
  - the nuggle also known as the shoopiltee or njogel (Shetland)
  - the cabbyl-ushtey (Isle of Man)
  - the Ceffyl Dŵr (Wales)
  - the capaill uisce or the glashtin (Ireland)
- Morgens, Morgans or Mari-Morgans are Welsh and Breton water spirits that drown men.
- Selkie

== Germanic ==
In Germanic mythology:

- The Nixie (English) or the Nix/Nixe/Nyx (German) are shapeshifting water spirits who usually appear in human, or horse, form
- The Undine or Ondine is a female water elemental (first appearing the alchemical works of Paracelsus)
- Jenny Greenteeth in the folklore of Lancashire
- Peg Powler said to inhabit the River Tees in Yorkshire
- The grindylow in the folklore of both Lancashire and Yorkshire.

== Ancient Greek ==
In Greek mythology:

- Naiads were nymphs who presided over fountains, wells, springs, streams, and brooks
  - Crinaeae (Κρηναῖαι) were a type of nymph associated with fountains
  - Limnades or Leimenides (Λιμνάδες / Λειμενίδες) were a type of naiad living in freshwater lakes.
  - Pegaeae (Πηγαῖαι) were a type of naiad that lived in springs.
- Nereids were sea nymphs.
- Sirens were bird-bodied women living in the sea near a rocky island coastline.

== Japanese ==
In Japanese folklore:

- Kappa (河童; "river-child"), alternately called Kawatarō (川太郎; "river-boy") or Kawako (川子; "river-child"), are a type of water sprite.
- A Hyōsube (ひょうすべ) is a hair-covered version of a Kappa.

== Turkic ==
In Turkic mythology:

- Su Iyesi is a water spirit. People should not make her angry. Turkic people do not pollute the water so as not to anger the Su Iyesi. Su Iyesi is mostly considered female.

== Mesoamerican ==
- Ahuizotl; a dog-like aquatic creature that drowned the unwary in Aztec mythology.

== South American ==
- Pincoys in Chilote mythology
- Yacuruna; water people of the Amazon River, said to abduct surface dwellers.

== Filipino ==
- Siyokoys, hostile aquatic humanoids

== Oceanic ==
In the mythology of Oceania:

- Adaro were malevolent merman-like sea spirits found in the mythology of the Solomon Islands.
- Bunyip were evil water spirits said to inhabit watering holes in Indigenous Australian folklore.
- Pania from Maori mythology
- Ponaturi, evil sea spirits in Maori mythology.

== Roman ==
In Roman mythology:

- Camenae were goddesses of springs, wells and fountains, or water nymphs of Venus (mythology).

== Slavic ==
In Slavic mythology:

- A Vodyanoy (also wodnik, vodník, vodnik, vodenjak) is a male water spirit akin to the Germanic Neck.
- A Rusalka (plural: rusalki) was a female ghost, water nymph, succubus or mermaid-like demon that dwelled in a waterway.
- А Berehynia in ancient Ukrainian folklore is a goddess spirit that guarded the edges of waterways, while today it is used as a symbol for Ukrainian nationalism.
- Moryana is a giant sea spirit from Russian folklore.
- For potoplenyk, vila/wila/wili/veela, and vodianyk, see also Slavic fairies.

== Nordic ==
In Finnish mythology, the water folk (vedenväki) are a group of creatures living under water and their magical power. According to the Kalevala, there are many spirits in the water, including water goblins (vesihiisi), water elves (vetehinen or näkki), mermaids and small men rising from the sea, who sometimes appeared to help people with great power. Anyone who was afraid of water or behaved inappropriately near water could incur the wrath of the water folk and become ill. The water folk also included individualized and named water spirits, such as Ahti, Vellamo and Iku-Turso.

- Nøkken
- Selkie
- Sjörå
- Skogsrå
- Storsjöodjuret

== Thai ==
- Phi Phraya (ผีพราย, พรายน้ำ), a ghost living in the water.
- Phi Thale (ผีทะเล), a spirit of the sea. It manifests itself in different ways, one of them being St. Elmo's fire, among other uncanny phenomenons experienced by sailors and fishermen while on boats.

== Jain ==
Apakāya ekendriya is a name used in the traditions of Jainism for Jīvas that were reincarnated as rain, dew, fog, melted snow and melted hail.

== Qatari ==
Bū Daryā is a water Jinn who terrorizes sailors and pearl divers in Qatari folklore.

== Korean ==
The Mul Gwishin (Korean: 물귀신; RR: mul gwisin; MR: mul kwisin) is a form of gwisin left behind after some deaths by drowning.
