= Kostroma (deity) =

East Slavic fertility goddess

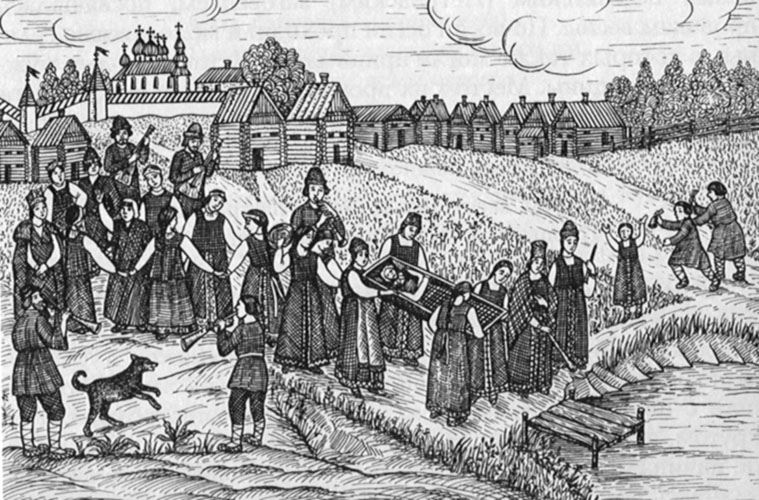
Funeral of Kostroma. Drawing from the lubok. 19th century

Kostroma (Russian: Кострома́) is an East Slavic fertility goddess. Her name is derived from костёр (kostyor), the Russian word for "bonfire".

The rites of Semik were devoted to her. During this festival a disguised girl or a straw figure portrayed Kostroma. First, a scarecrow was honored and revered. Then, participants of the rite mourned the death of Kostroma, and burned or tore the scarecrow. Rituals with Kostroma were aimed at improving soil fertility.

The scarecrow of Kostroma is part of East Slavic folklore.

== Mythology ==
There is a Slavic myth about Kostroma and Kupalo. According to the myth, Kupalo and Kostroma were twins. Their parents were Simargl, the god of fire, and Kupalnitsa, goddess of the night. They were born on the summer solstice. In honor of their birthday, Perun gave Kupalo and Kostroma a Fern flower, but they presented it to people as a sign of the unity of the human world and the world of gods.

Once, Kostroma and Kupalo ran into a field (or to the riverbank) to listen to songs of birds Sirin (the bird of sorrow) and Alkonost (the bird of joy). Both birds, especially Sirin, were dangerous. The one who listened to the singing of Sirin forever went into the Nav, the world of the dead. Kostroma listened to the singing of Alkonost, while Kupalo listened to the song of Sirin. And then, by the order of the Ruler of the Underworld (probably Veles or Chernobog), Sirin and gusi-lebedi (The Magic Swan Geese) stole Kupalo and carried him into the Nav.

Many years later, one day, Kostroma walked the shore of the river Volga and made a wreath. She boasted that the wind would not blow the wreath off her head. According to the belief, it meant that she would not marry. This boast was not approved by the gods. The wind become stronger, and wreath was blown by the wind from Kostroma's head and fell into the water, where it was picked up by Kupalo, who was nearby in the boat. According to the Slavic customs, the one who picked up the wreath must necessarily marry the girl who made it. Kupalo and Kostroma fell in love and shortly were married without any knowledge that they were brother and sister. After the wedding, the gods told them the truth. That is why Kupalo and Kostroma committed suicide. Kupalo has jumped into the fire and died, while Kostroma ran to the forest, threw herself into the lake and drowned. But she did not die, she became a mavka (or a rusalka). Walking around that lake, she charmed the men she met on her path and dragged them into the water abyss. She mistook them for Kupalo, and found out that the caught young man was not her lover only when he had already drowned.

And then, the gods repented, realizing that their revenge was too cruel. But to give Kupalo and Kostroma again the human body was impossible, and they turned them into the flower with yellow and blue petals, in which the fiery-yellow color was the color of Kupalo, and the blue one, like the waters of a forest lake, was the color of Kostroma. The Slavs gave the name Kupalo-da-Mavka (Kupalo-and-Mavka) to the flower. Later, in the time of the Christianization of Kievan Rus', the flower was renamed to the Ivan-da-Marya (Ivan-and-Marya).

=== Other versions ===
In some versions of the myth, the Sirin appears alone, without the company of Alkonost. One of the versions also describes the suicide of Kostroma and Kupalo differently: the lovers joined hands and threw themselves off the cliff into the river.

== See also ==
- Kupalo
- Rusalka
- Mavka
