= Yvgenie =

1991 novel by C. J. Cherryh

- Del Rey hardcover first edition, 1991
- Author: C. J. Cherryh
- Cover artist: Keith Parkinson
- Language: English
- Genre: Fantasy
- Published: Del Rey Books
- Publication date: October 1991
- Publication place: United States
- Media type: Print (hardback & paperback, e-book)
- Pages: 282 (hardback edition)
- ISBN: 978-0-3453-6784-6
- Preceded by: Chernevog

Yvgenie is a fantasy novel by American science fiction and fantasy author C. J. Cherryh. It was first published in October 1991 in the United States in a hardcover edition by Ballantine Books under its Del Rey Books imprint. Yvgenie is book three of Cherryh's three-book Russian Stories trilogy set in medieval Russia in forests along the Dnieper River near Kyiv in modern-day Ukraine. The novel draws on Slavic folklore and concerns the fate of a girl who has drowned and become a rusalka. It is also an exploration of magic and the development of a young wizard.

Cherryh self-published a revised edition of Yvgenie in e-book format in 2012 at Closed Circle Publications.

== Plot summary ==
Yvgenie begins 15 years after the conclusion of Chernevog. Pyetr, Eveshka, Sasha and Ilyana, Eveshka and Pyetr's 15-year-old wizard daughter, live in Uulamets' cottage. One day they are alarmed to discover that Ilyana has befriended a ghost, whom they suspect may be Chernevog. They explain to Ilyana who Chernevog is and the dangers he and his vodyanoi partner, Hwiuur pose to them all.

Later, during a storm, Ilyana rescues a half-drowned boy, Yvgenie from the swollen river. He has no memory of where he came from, but when she brings him home, he is locked up in case he is Chernevog. Ilyana, believing that Pyetr and Sasha are going to kill Yvgenie, uses wizardry to overpower them and frees Yvgenie. Having lost one friend she is determined not to lose another and runs off with him. Eveshka, Pyetr and Sasha pursue Ilyana and Yvgenie into the forest.

Fleeing with Yvgenie, Ilyana discovers that he is possessed by Chernevog's ghost, and that Chernevog had revived the drowned boy and occupied his body. Periodically Yvgenie's shy demeanor is replaced by Chernevog's commanding presence. Ilyana has sympathies for both the boy she rescued and her ghost friend, and lets Chernevog lead them through the forest.

While tracking Ilyana and Yvgenie/Chernevog, leshys (Note: In her book, Cherryh uses the plural "leshys", not "leshies".) bring a girl, Nadya to Pyetr and Sasha. She is the daughter of Yurishev's young wife with whom Pyetr had an affair in Vojvoda in Rusalka. Unbeknown to Pyetr, Nadya is his daughter. She was due to wed Yvgenie from Kyiv in an arranged marriage, but when Yvgenie's father found out that Nadya was illegitimate, he threatened to kill her. Yvgenie took Nadya into the forest to escape his father and was overwhelmed by the flooded river. Yvgenie was rescued by Ilyana (after Chernevog had revived him) and Nadya was found by the leshys.

Chernevog leads Ilyana to the stone in the leshy's circle upon which he had slept. After Chernevog died near the end of Chernevog, the leshys took his bones to the stone. Then when Ilyana was born, they used magic to revive him and sent him to bring her back to the stone. Ilyana was young, innocent and gifted, and the leshys believed she could defeat Hwiuur, who was spreading evil through the forest. But by the time Chernevog arrives at the stone with Ilyana, the leshys have succumbed to Hwiuur and died. Chernevog had delayed his return with Ilyana because he had fallen in love with her and knew the leshys would preserve her on the stone.

Having lost his control over Chernevog, Hwiuur harasses Pyetr and Sasha, and then attempts to bargain with Eveshka for Ilyana. Finally Hwiuur attacks Ilyana, but Sasha, Pyetr and Eveshka find her, and Sasha rams a pot of salt down the vodyanoi's throat, neutralizing him. Safe again, the family reunites, with the addition of Nadya and Chernevog/Yvgenie. Chernevog explains that when the leshys freed him, they changed him and that he is not the evil person he used to be. Nadya is welcomed by Eveshka and Ilyana as their step-daughter and -sister. Ilyana is happy with her new friend(s) Chernevog/Yvgenie, and Sasha and Nadya have become attracted to each other. Sasha later confesses to Eveshka that he had wished for companionship, but Eveshka believes that a wish 100 years ago had set all these events in motion.

== Reception ==
Science fiction and fantasy writer Roland J. Green wrote in a review of Yvgenie in the Chicago Sun-Times that he was impressed with Cherryh's "characterization and knowledge of folklore", and described the whole Russian series as her "most significant work of fantasy". A reviewer in Kirkus Reviews was less enthusiastic about Yvgenie, saying that the "most bothersome aspect" of this story is its "sourceless, effortless magic", and did not expect the book to attract too many devotees, except perhaps young readers who may be drawn to Ilyana's predicament.

== Works cited ==
- Bogstad, Janice M. (2004). "Shifting Ground: Subjectivities in Cherryh's Slavic Fantasy Trilogy". In Carmien, Edward (ed.). The Cherryh Odyssey. Wildside Press LLC. pp. 113–131. ISBN 978-0-8095-1071-9.
- Cherryh, C. J. (2012a) [1991]. Yvgenie (e-book ed.). Spokane, Washington: Closed Circle Publications.
