= The Cherryh Odyssey =

2004 collection of essays about C. J. Cherryh, edited by Edward Carmien

- First edition book cover
- Author: Edward Carmien (ed)
- Cover artist: David Cherry
- Language: English
- Subject: Literary criticism, science fiction / fantasy
- Publisher: Borgo Press
- Publication date: September 2004
- Publication place: United States
- Media type: print (hardback)
- Pages: 280 (first edition)
- ISBN: 0-8095-1071-5

The Cherryh Odyssey is a 2004 collection of essays by various academics, critics and authors about American Hugo Award-winning science fiction and fantasy author, C. J. Cherryh. It was edited by author and academic, Edward Carmien, and was published by Borgo Press, an imprint of Wildside Press as part of its Author Study series. Locus Magazine put the book on its "2004 Recommended Reading List", and Carmien received a nomination for the 2005 Locus Award for Best Non-fiction book for The Cherryh Odyssey.

The book's cover was painted by Cherryh's brother, David Cherry. He had originally intended it to be used for the cover of Cherryh's 1986 collection of short fiction, Visible Light, but it was "not warmly received by the publisher".

== Background ==
C. J. Cherryh (a pseudonym for Carolyn Janice Cherry) is an American science fiction and fantasy author who has written over 60 novels. She has received several literary awards, including three Hugo Awards for the short story "Cassandra" (1978), and the novels Downbelow Station (1981) and Cyteen (1988). She added a silent "h" to her real name at the suggestion of her first editor because he felt that "Cherry" sounded too much like a romance writer. She also used the initials "C. J." to hide the fact that she was female, at a time (the mid-1970s) when most science fiction writers were male.

Edward Carmien is a fiction and non-fiction author and editor of science fiction, fantasy and other topics. He is professor of English at Mercer County Community College, New Jersey, where he teaches science fiction. Carmien is a member of the Science Fiction and Fantasy Writers of America (SFWA) and the Science Fiction Research Association (SFRA).

The Cherryh Odyssey was compiled by Carmien to mark the thirtieth anniversary of the publication of Cherryh's first two novels in 1976, Gate of Ivrel and Brothers of Earth.

== Table of contents ==
1. "Preface" – by Edward Carmien
2. "About the Cover" – by David Cherry
3. "Introduction: What We Do for Love" – by James Gunn
4. "The Cherryh Legacy ... An Author's Perspective" – by Jane Fancher
5. "A Pioneer of the Mind" – by Betsy Wollheim
6. "Oklahoma Launch" – by Bradley H. Sinor
7. "C.J. Cherryh's Fiction" – by Burton Raffel
8. "A Great Deal in Sand: Hammerfall by C.J. Cherryh" – by John Clute
9. "C.J. Cherryh: Is There Really Only One of Her?" – by Heather Stark
10. "Shifting Ground: Subjectivities in Cherryh's Slavic Fantasy Trilogy" – by Janice Bogstad
11. "The Human as Other in the Science Fiction Novels of C.J. Cherryh" – by J. G. Stinson
12. "A Woman with a Mission; or, Why Vanye's Tale Is Morgaine's Saga" – by Janice C. Crosby
13. "Of Emorys and Warricks: Self-Creation in Cyteen" – by Susan Bernardo
14. "Dr. Ariane Emory, Sr.: Psychopath—Or Savior?" – by Elizabeth Romey
15. "The Literary Life of C.J. Cherryh" – by Edward Carmien
16. "Selected Bibliography of C.J. Cherryh" – by Stan Szalewicz

== Synopsis ==
The Cherryh Odyssey consists of eight analytical essays on C. J. Cherryh's works, four personal reflections, and a fifty-six page bibliography of Cherryh by Stan Szalewicz. Also included is a preface and a biography, "The Literary Life of C.J. Cherryh" by the editor, Edward Carmien.

In "Introduction: What We Do for Love", science fiction author and scholar James Gunn explains how difficult it must have been for Cherryh to enter the male-dominated science fiction arena in the mid-1970s. He says that she wrote for the love of story-telling rather than for the money. Author and artist Jane Fancher, Cherryh's business and writing partner contributes a personal tribute, "The Cherryh Legacy ... An Author's Perspective" in which she relates Cherryh's childhood and her school and college years. At the age of ten, Cherryh started writing her own stories when Flash Gordon, her favorite TV program was cancelled. In this essay Fancher also analyses Cherryh's writing style, in particular a technique Cherryh calls "Third Person Intense Internal" (TPI-squared), in which the writer only narrates what the viewpoint character sees and thinks about. Betsy Wollheim, the daughter of Cherryh's first publisher, Donald A. Wollheim, gives another personal account of Cherryh in "A Pioneer of the Mind". Wollheim describes the relationship that developed between her father, also a science fiction writer, and Cherryh, and recounts Cherryh's passion for space travel that is reflected in many of her stories. In "Oklahoma Launch", author Bradley H. Sinor gives his views on Cherryh, who later became his friend and mentor. They both lived in Lawton, Oklahoma during their childhood, and crossed paths again at a University of Oklahoma science fiction club meeting.

Translator and poet Burton Raffel explores the literary aspects of most of Cherryh's science fiction novels in "C.J. Cherryh's Fiction". He describes Cherryh as "a master of detail, tone, and emotional wallop." "A Great Deal in Sand: Hammerfall by C.J. Cherryh" is an extract from author and critic John Clute's essay collection, Scores: Reviews 1993–2003. Here Clute analyses Cherryh's Gene War novels Hammerfall (2001) and its sequel Forge of Heaven (2004), and takes her writing to task, complaining about, amongst other things, the "literal back-and-forth slog through the desert" that dominates the story. Heather Stark in "C.J. Cherryh: Is There Really Only One of Her?" questions how one person can write so many books in thirty years. She also examines the ratio of Cherryh's science fiction to fantasy output, concluding that, in her opinion, Cherryh's science fiction works better than her fantasy. In contrast, academic Janice Bogstad praises Cherryh's fantasy in "Shifting Ground: Subjectivities in Cherryh's Slavic Fantasy Trilogy". Here Bogstad analyses Cherryh's Russian trilogy, Rusalka (1989), Chernevog (1990) and Yvgenie (1991), explaining how her use of magic "complicates and questions typical high-fantasy tropes, particularly wizards and magic powers." Bogstad maintains that Cherryh's books are "satires of their respective genres due to the conveyed intensity of the mental and emotional challenges the characters face in their out-of-the-ordinary experiences."

Critic J. G. Stinson explores how human characters in Cherryh's fiction cope with and adjust to alien cultures in "The Human as Other in the Science Fiction Novels of C.J. Cherryh". She shows how they "all absorb elements of the thinking, behavior, and worldview of their 'adopted' cultures", that gives readers a "highly believable window into worlds and minds outside their own." Janice C. Crosby analyses gender roles in Cherryh's four-book Morgaine Saga in her essay "A Woman With a Mission; or, Why Vanye's Tale is Morgaine's Saga". Cherryh's Hugo Award winning novel, Cyteen is the subject of two essays, "Of Emorys and Warricks: Self-Creation in Cyteen" by academic Susan Bernardo, and "Dr. Ariane Emory, Sr.: Psychopath—Or Savior?" by academic Elizabeth Romey. Both examine the relationship between a senior scientist Dr. Ariane Emory and her apprentice Justin Warrick at a research facility on the planet of Cyteen.

The "Selected Bibliography of C.J. Cherryh" was compiled by Stan Szalewicz, a media librarian at Rider University in New Jersey, and is an in-depth 56-page document that comprises:

- General biographical resources (interviews, essays and criticism)
- Internet biographical resources
- Novels, novellas and short stories by Cherryh
- Other writing by Cherryh
- A list of reviews of works by Cherryh

== Reception ==
Jeff D’Anastasio, in a review of The Cherryh Odyssey in the SFRA Review described the book as "a remarkable anthology of personal tributes and literary analysis." He said it is "a must—not only for all of her fans, but also for anyone teaching her works." David G. Hartwell, publisher of The New York Review of Science Fiction, said that The Cherryh Odyssey is "where all future Cherryh scholarship will begin."

== Sources ==
- Carmien, Edward, ed. (2004). The Cherryh Odyssey. Borgo Press. ISBN 0-8095-1071-5.
