= Moryana =

Female sea spirit in Slavic folklore

Moryana (Russian: Моря́на, pronounced [mɐˈrʲanə]) is a female sea spirit in Slavic folklore, possibly a goddess. Moryana was a sea vodyanitsa and daughter of the Sea Tsar, and also, according to some beliefs, she ruled the winds. Sometimes the moryany/moryanki (plural; Russian: моряны, морянки; Polish: moriany) were said to be numerous spirits of the sea and a marine kind of rusalki, which posed a great threat to ships, but usually Moryana was represented as a single entity.

Due to the consonance of her name with the name of the goddess Morana, Moryana was sometimes identified with her and was called the goddess of death.

== Etymology ==
Moryana's name is derived from море meaning "sea", and with the feminine ending яна it is roughly translated as "she of the sea". Moryana's name is used in some regions of Russia to describe the cold and harsh winds she personifies; these winds blow from the sea to the land and are also called морянка, морянник and моряной.

== In folklore ==
It was believed that Moryana often swam deep in the sea, taking the form of a big fish and playing with dolphins. She came ashore only on quiet evenings. At this time of day she swayed on the waves, splashed in the water and fingered sea pebbles. When a storm was rising due to the Morskoy Tsar becoming angry, Moryana calmed him down, and the storm also subsided. She also rode the sea in a golden canoe. Her beauty was so dazzling that it was impossible to look at her at once. According to Vasily Prokhorov, a Russian archaeologist and ethnographer, Moryana, in the minds of the pagans, was a goddess and beloved of the Sun, and in one old tale she appears under the name of Tsarevna Anastasia. In this tale, Ivan Tsarevich overhears the conversation of the Sun with his mother, in which the Sun confesses that when Anastasia splashes water on him, she makes him blush with bashfulness. In the beautiful image of Moryana, fairy tales combine the ideas of the goddess of dawn and the goddess of thunder.

In another belief, Moryana was described as a stern, very tall woman with uncombed hair and wearing white clothes. She controlled the southeast winds at the mouth of the Volga, which posed a huge threat to sailors and fishermen on the northwest coast of the Caspian Sea. Slowly walking across the water, she brought disasters and devastation. Moryana's main enemy was Ded Shapka Dranaya (Russian: Дед – ша́пка дра́ная; transl. Old man-in-a-torn-hat), the ruler of the northwest wind, but he almost always lost to the giantess. When they were colliding in battle, the waves of the sea were swirling and rising like a pillar to the sky before sinking the ships.

In beliefs where the moryany are a family of spirits, they were also described as maidens of enormous stature. They were active during storms, waiting for the ships at the coastal cliffs, and, rising from the waves, rocked them so that they were wrecked. Sometimes they attacked people, and the only way to avoid the attack of the sea vodyanitsy was to pull out as much of their sea foam-like hair as possible. Vladimir Dal mentioned moryany together with the ognyany (lit. "the fiery ones") and vetryany (lit. "the windy ones"); other sources include the zemlyany (lit. "the earthen ones") among them, which indicates a connection with the elementals of the European tradition.

== See also ==
- Vodyanoy
- Mermaid
- Nereid
- Oceanid
- Ognyena Maria, a calendar character who may have been influenced by the image of Moryana
- Siren
- Chernava, another of the Sea Tsar's daughters.
