= Bolotnik =

Slavic spirit of the marshes and tutelary deity

In Slavic mythology, bolotnik (Russian: болотник, pronounced [bɐˈɫotʲnʲɪk]; from boloto, "swamp"), balotnik (Belarusian: балотнiк), bolotianyk (Ukrainian: болотяник) or błotnik (Polish; [ˈbwɔtnik]; "mud" or "puddle") is a male swamp spirit. There are many descriptions of bolotnik. Usually he was portrayed as a man or an old man who has big, frog-like eyes, a green beard and long hair. His body is covered with dirt, algae and fish scales. The legends from the Vitebsk Governorate of Russia said that bolotnik is a dirty, fat, eyeless creature that motionlessly sits at the bottom of the swamp. In some accounts bolotnik is also said to have long arms and a curled tail. Just like the majority of Slavic water spirits, he would lure and drag people into the water if they got close to the edge. It is believed that bolotnik has neither wife nor children; in the other legends he is married to bolotnitsa, a female swamp spirit.

Bolotniki (plural) are rarely found in folklore, and the swamp-dwelling spirit was often thought of as a kind of vodyanoy, leshy or chort. The image of a bolotnitsa was mixed with those of a rusalka, a vodyaniha, a leshachikha, a «wild hag» and a swamp kikimora.

== Name ==
Bolotnik has a lot of names: bolotny (Russian: болотный; lit. '[he] from the swamp, swampy'), bolotyanik (болотяник), bolotny dedko (болотный дедко; 'swamp old man, swamp grandpa'), shut bolotny (шут болотный; 'swamp jester'), bolotny chort (болотный чёрт; 'swamp devil'), bolotny leshy (болотный леший; 'leshy of the swamp'), tsar bolotny (царь болотный; 'the Swamp Tsar' or 'the Swamp King'), boloto (болото; lit. 'swamp'), antsybal (анцибал), antsybul (анцибул), antsybalka (анцибалка), antsybalit (анцибалит), anchibal (анчибал), anchibol (Russian: анчибол), balotnik (Belarusian: балотнiк), bolotyanik (Ukrainian: болотяник), ocheretianyk (очеретяник), błotnik (Old Polish).

The naming "antsybal", according to one version, is an old borrowing from the Baltic languages, compared with the Lithuanian ančiabalis, meaning 'duck swamp'. According to another version, this is a borrowing of the Czech ančibél, which could be the result of combination of the words antikrist ('antichrist'), and d'abel ('devil').

== Origin ==
North Slavs treated the swamps as dangerous and "unclean" places where chorty, biesy and other demons live. The very origin of the swamps in the Vitebsk Governorate was associated with the earth, which, during the creation of land by God, the chort hid in his mouth and then spat it out.

The origin of bolotniki, according to popular legends, is the same as that of the rest of the evil spirits: they are fallen angels thrown down from heaven by God or the creations of Satan. It is unknown how swamp spirits were perceived in the pre-Christian era, but the Novgorod Kormchaia Book (a collection of canon law) of the 13th century mentions that the Eastern pagan Slavs made sacrifices to demons, swamps, and wells.

== Behavior ==
It was believed that bolotnik or bolotnitsa would lure people or animals to the swamp before they drown them. It is especially attracted to people who play the sopelka (сопелка, a sort of long flute) at night, but few people play it nowadays.

Therefore, to lure people to the swamp, bolotnik quacked like a duck, mooed like a cow, gurgled like a black grouse, or let out moans, or burst out in laughter.

Hidden among other flora of the marshes, he secretly cultivates the intoxicating bagun (багун (Note: aka bagulnik багульник.) plant (which is a general term for ledum or bog rosemary) which has an intoxicating or stupefying effect on visitors to the swampland. The blotnik would also create pallid flickers of light over the marshland. When a person is already in the quagmire, bolotnik grabs them by the feet and slowly, but inevitably, drags them to the depths.

In the Cherepovets District of the Novgorod Governorate, it was believed that the swamp devils curse the house-building logs when they are transported through the swamp, and when a house is built from them, misfortunes begin to occur in it.

The Ukrainians of the Voronezh Governorate and the modern Belarusians of the Gomel Oblast say that the bolotnik invites passers-by, takes them to beautiful rooms in which music plays, treats them, dances with them, and gives them gifts. However, when they come to their senses, it turns out that they all this time sat in a swamp and instead of gifts they have some kind of garbage.

In the Vitebsk Governorate, several types of swamp devils were distinguished. The orzhavinik (or arzhavenik; Russian: оржавиник; Belarusian: аржавенік) are inhabitants of the orzhavin (оржавина, type of marsh rich in iron ore), characterized by rusty colored patches floating on the water's surface. The orzhavinik thus have reddish-brown fur, a thick belly and spindly thin legs. The bagnik (also spelled bugnik; Russian: багник; Belarusian: багнік), a spirit of a lower rank lives in bogs, never appears on the surface, and only grabs people by the legs. He can be noticed by the bubbles rising from the depths and by the "pale lights" sometimes visible in the swamp. According to Belarus folkore, the orzhavinik was highest in hierarchy, then bagnik, while the bolotnik proper ranked lowest. The lozoviki (or lazaviki), the "willow dwellers" are grouped among the bog beings also. They are small, vine-colored creatures that entangle travelers in the bushes and then help them get out. Beliefs also mention virovnik (Russian: вировник; from vir, a deep place in a swamp or river).

Unlike other demons, bolotnik is not afraid of thunderbolts as they lose their power when they come into contact with the surface of the swamp. Bolotniki perish when the swamps are drained and in winter when they freeze over.

Polish błotnik is an evil spirit appearing in the form of a pitch-black man with a lantern in his hands who, illuminating the way for the travelers, leads them astray towards the swamp. He is often associated with Boruta, the most well-known Polish devil from the town Łęczyca.

== Bolotnitsa ==
In the Russian North, it is believed that bolotnitsa (Russian: болотница) is mistress of the swamp and tundra. She is also known as the bolotnaya baba (Russian: болотная баба; lit. 'swamp hag') in the Arkhangelsk Region and volnaya starukha (вольная старуха) in the Vologda Region. She may be identifiable with the lopatnitsa (Russian: лопатница) and omutnitsa (Russian: омутница), which dwells in the omut' ('[swirling] deep spot in river or lake').

She shares some of the characteristics of the rusalka. (Note: Some sources add that the bolonitsa is responsible for causing storms, downpours and hail, thereby destroying crops; steal thread and women who fell asleep without offering prayer. But the language used is closely similar to the commentary on the rusalka in the writings of S. V. Maksimov (1903).)

She is depicted as figure with green eyes and dissheveled hair, consisting of seaweed. She dwells in the swamps, and her business is to lure people entering the marshland, and tickling them to death, drawing them into the quagmire. It was sometimes believed that bolotnitsa loves to sing.

The bolotnitsa is depicted as being a snow-white skinned beauty in the Pavel Ivanovich Melnikov novel, In the Forests (1874), (Note: She has black hair, and "Her eyes are like the very forget-me-nots scattered across the bog; she has long, sweeping lashes and slender, coal-black brows. Yet her lips are pale, and there is not a drop of living blood in her face, her full, rounded bosom, or her graceful, slender form (Глаза ровно тѣ незабудки, что разсѣяны по чарусѣ, длинныя, пушистыя рѣсницы, тонкія, какъ уголь черныя брови... только губы блѣдноваты, и ни въ лицѣ, ни въ полной наливной груди, ни во всемъ стройномъ станѣ ея нѣтъ ни кровинки." "snow-white, translucent arms".) except she has "goose-like feet with black webbing" (гусиныя свои ноги съ чёрными перепонками), which she conceals by sitting in a giant water lily. This supposedly is extrapolated from local lore of the Nizhny Novgorod Governorate.

In other beliefs, such as in the Vologda Governorate, the bolotnitsa was described as an old hag with a large head. Modern residents of the Nizhny Novgorod Oblast believe that the bolotnitsa is shaggy, scary and green and that she sits in a swamp all the time, leaving it only at night.

In the north of the Omsk Governorate, there was a legend about a bolotnitsa named Marya, who lured young men to the swamp bumps where they met their deaths. Marya was a girl from the Mansi tribe. She settled in the taiga due to unhappy relationships with men and became a shamaness. This legend is featured in the work of a Russian writer Vladimir Erakhtin, and it was told to him by his grandfather (Russian: Марья-болотница, romanized: Marya-bolotnitsa).

== Other related figures ==
Belarusian folklore features a boogeyman-like entity named Zhalezny chalavek (Belarusian: Жалезны чалавек; "Iron man"), who also lives in a swamp and is sometimes associated with bolotnik. He is a gigantic creature whose body is made of iron, and he is incredibly dangerous towards children. The belief is associated with a large amount of iron ore deposits in impenetrable forest bogs in the territory of Belarus, especially Polesie.

The swamp kikimora (Russian: кикимора болотная) is a mischievous spirit, a close friend or a wife of a leshy. Beliefs about her are most widespread in Russia and less so in Belarus. She may look like a short, ugly, old hag or a middle-aged woman covered in grasses and moss, but she usually takes on an invisible form. She scares travelers with loud screams, knocks them off the road, and sometimes even drowns them.

Babay (Бабай), a night spirit from Russian and Ukrainian folklore, according to some beliefs, lives in a swamp, hiding in thickets of reeds during the daylight hours. Here also lives the North Russian lobasta (лобаста), an evil old hag of enormous growth with very large breasts. She grabs passersby and tickles them to death with her nipples.

Karakondjul from the Bulgarian and Serbian folklore may also inhabit the swamp. This spirit is active at night and likes to play tricks on people by jumping on their backs and riding them until the morning.

Anchutka (Russian: анчутка) is an imp-like creature that may dwell in water, serving a bolotnik or vodyanoy. He is described as a small, nasty, horned and heelless creature. It is believed that he causes seizures in swimmers. Anchutka is the old Russian name for a bes.

According to some accounts, the swamp spirits, including the bolotnik, bolotnitsa, kikimora and karakondjul, are the companions and assistants of One-Eyed Likho (Russian: Лихо Одноглазое).

In Poland, the swamp was believed to be the home of boginki, dangerous female spirits that kidnapped babies. The latawiec, a spirit that takes the form of a fireball, was also believed to live in this place.

== See also ==
- likhomanka, likhoradka – Female spirit in Slavic mythology
