= Topielec =

Slavic spirits of water

Utopiec (plural Utopce), Vodník or Topnik is a name applied to Slavic spirits of water. The utopce are spirits of human souls that died drowning, residing in the element of their own demise. They are responsible for sucking people into swamps and lakes as well as killing the animals standing near the still waters.

Slavonic water spirits of the drowned dead remained a popular element of rural Polish folklore at the turn of the 19th and 20th century, as shown by Władysław Reymont in his Nobel Prize-winning novel Chłopi (The Peasants). Its story takes place during the 1880s in Congress Poland and follows the everyday life of the peasantry in a typical Polish village. In the tenth chapter of book two, some of the characters gather together to exchange stories and legends, in one of which the topielica (feminine form of topielec) is mentioned.

A more recent example of the utopiec in Polish popular culture is the comic book series Lil and Put, where the two titular characters are constantly at odds with an Utopiec living in a pond next to their village. He is never directly seen and possesses magical powers.

Utopiec is the official Polish translation of the Drowned, a monster and hostile entity from the video game Minecraft.

== See also ==
- Vodyanoy
- Rusalka
- Kelpie
- Kappa
