= Nav (Slavic folklore) =

Concept in Slavic folklore

Nav (Croatian, Czech, Slovak: Nav, Polish: Nawia, Russian: Навь, Serbian: Нав, Slovene: Navje, Ukrainian: Мавка, Mavka or Нявка, Nyavka) (Note: A figure named Nāves māte ("Mother Death") exists in Latvian mythology, as one of the Mahtes, a designation for several female deities. The connection with Slovenian navje was already seen by scholar Nikolai Mikhailov.) is a phrase used to denote the souls of the dead in Slavic mythology. The singular form (Nav or Nawia) is also used as a name for an underworld, over which Veles exercises custody—it is often interpreted as another name for the underground variant of the Vyraj (heaven or paradise).

== Etymology ==
The words nawia, nav and its other variants are most likely derived from the Proto-Slavic *navь-, meaning "corpse", "deceased". Cognates in other Indo-European languages include Latvian nāve ("death"), Lithuanian nõvis ("death"), Old Prussian nowis ("body, flesh"), Old East Slavic навь (navʹ) ("corpse, dead body") and Gothic 𐌽𐌰𐌿𐍃 (naus, "dead body, corpse").

== As souls or spirits ==
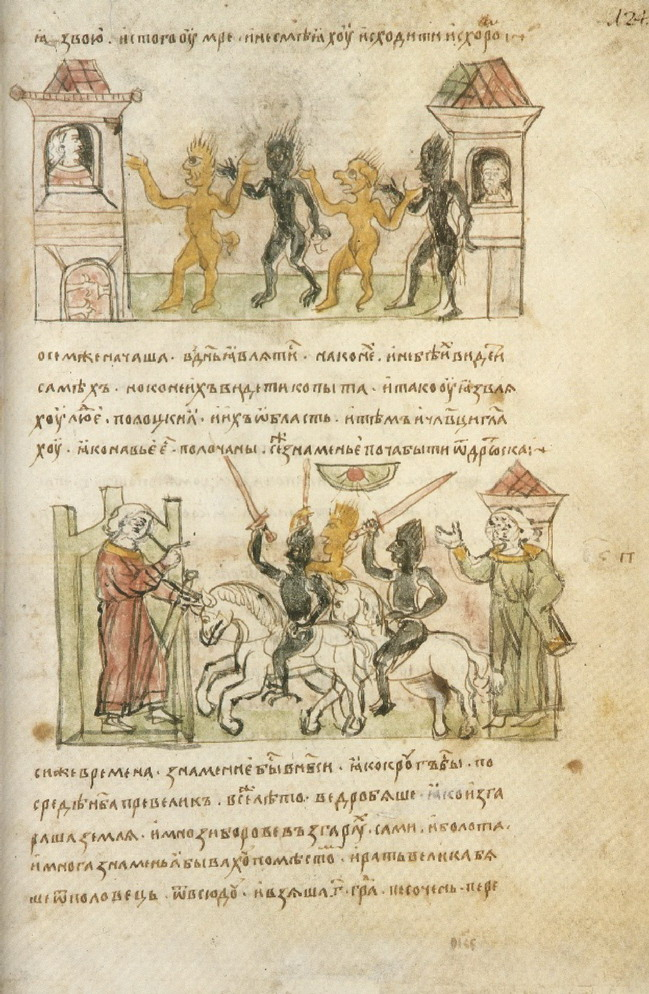
Nawie and bieses during an epidemic in Polotsk. Miniatures from Radzivill Chronicle, late 15th century.

The nawie, nawki, sometimes also referred to as lalki (Polish language; all plural forms) were used as names for the souls of the dead. According to some scholars (namely Stanisław Urbańczyk, among others), this word was a general name for demons arising out of the souls of tragic and premature deaths, killers, warlocks, the murdered and the Drowned Dead. They were said to be hostile and unfavourable towards humans, being jealous of life. In Bulgarian folklore there exists the character of 12 navias that sucked the blood out of women giving birth, whereas in the Ruthenian Primary Chronicle the navias are presented as a demonic personification of the 1092 plague in Polotsk. According to folk tales, the nawie usually took the form of birds.

== As an underworld ==
The phrase Nawia (Polish) or Nav (used across Slavic tongues) was also utilised as a name for the Slavonic underworld, ruled by the god Veles, enclosed away from the world either by a living sea or river, according to some beliefs located deep underground. According to Ruthenian folklore, Veles lived on a swamp in the centre of Nav, where he sat on a golden throne at the base of the Cosmic Tree, wielding a sword. Symbolically, the Nav has also been described as a huge green plain—pasture, onto which Veles guides souls. The entrance to Nav was guarded by a Zmey. It was believed the souls would later be reborn on earth. It is highly likely that these folk beliefs were the inspiration behind the neopagan idea of Jav, Prav and Nav in the literary forgery known as the Book of Veles.

== See also ==
- Mavka
- Prav-Yav-Nav
- Rusalka
- Unclean spirit
