= Slavic folklore =

Folklore of the Slavic peoples

Slavic folklore encompasses the folklore of the Slavic peoples from their earliest records until today. Folklorists have published a variety of works focused specifically on the topic over the years.

There are few written records of pagan Slavic beliefs; research of the pre-Christian Slavic beliefs is challenging due to a stark class divide between nobility and peasantry who worshipped separate deities. Many Christian beliefs were later integrated and synthesized into Slavic folklore.

== See also ==
- Vladimir Propp, Russian folklorist who specialized in morphology
- Supernatural beings in Slavic religion
- Deities of Slavic religion
