= Chernevog =

1990 novel by C. J. Cherryh

- Del Rey hardcover first edition, 1990
- Author: C. J. Cherryh
- Cover artist: Keith Parkinson
- Language: English
- Genre: Fantasy novel
- Published: Del Rey Books
- Publication date: September 1990
- Publication place: United States
- Media type: Print (hardback, paperback, e-book)
- Pages: 328 (hardcover edition)
- ISBN: 978-0-3453-5954-4
- Preceded by: Rusalka
- Followed by: Yvgenie

Chernevog is a fantasy novel by American science fiction and fantasy author C. J. Cherryh. It was first published in September 1990 in the United States in a hardcover edition by Ballantine Books under its Del Rey Books imprint. Chernevog is book two of Cherryh's three-book Russian Stories trilogy set in medieval Russia in forests along the Dnieper River near Kyiv in modern-day Ukraine. The novel draws on Slavic folklore, the title of the novel being a variant name of the "black god" Chernobog, and concerns the fate of a girl who has drowned and become a rusalka. It is also an exploration of magic and the development of a young wizard.

Cherryh self-published a revised edition of Chernevog in e-book format in March 2012 at Closed Circle Publications. Authorship of this edition is credited to C. J. Cherryh and Jane Fancher because of Fancher's contributions to the revisions.

== Plot summary ==
Chernevog begins three years after the conclusion of Rusalka. Sasha, Pyetr and Eveshka are living in Uulamets' cottage; Sasha is 18 and a young wizard, and Pyetr and Eveshka are married. Chernevog is still asleep in the forest, guarded by the leshys, (Note: In her book, Cherryh uses the plural "leshys", not "leshies".) but Sasha and Eveshka have disturbing dreams about him waking up. One day Sasha and Pyetr find that Eveshka has disappeared, and they set off to find her. They suspect that she may have gone to confront Chernevog, who still controls their lives.

Sasha and Pyetr travel into the forest and find Chernevog still asleep. Pyetr tries to kill him once and for all, but an owl, a childhood friend of Chernevog's whom he gave his heart to, attacks Pyetr. Pyetr kills the owl and Chernevog regains his heart, which wakes him up. Chernevog had given away his heart to free his conscience, enabling him to practise magic freely. Sasha has learnt that Chernevog had rejected Uulamets' teachings of wizardry, which works within nature and considers the consequences of wishes, and turned to magic, which taps dark forces and is not concerned with laws of nature. Pyetr tries to kill Chernevog again, but Sasha stops him. With his heart, Chernevog's actions are limited and Sasha is able to control him. Sasha and Pyetr resume their search for Eveshka, taking Chernevog with them.

Eveshka's reason for fleeing the house is because she knows Chernevog will wake up and she fears for their safety. She is drawn to a house occupied by her mother, Draga, whom Chernevog and murdered after he had had Eveshka killed. Draga and Uulamets had met when they were both under the tutelage of a wizard named Malenkova, but Uulamets feared her and ran away. Draga killed the wizard, and later, pregnant, arrived at Uulamets' cottage to give birth to Eveshka. Uulamets took Eveshka away from Draga, and fearing for her life, she ran away, leaving Uulamets the task of bringing up and controlling a "doubly gifted" wizard. Draga then found Chernevog, an abandoned child who had been abused by another wizard, and took him in. Chernevog was wild and appeared possessed, but she controlled and manipulated him, then sent him to Uulamets to be his student. Chernevog hated Uulamets and had killed Eveshka to revenge him. Chernevog then, using his new-found skills, hunted down and killed Draga. Over the years Draga, as a ghost, slowly willed herself back to life, intent on revenging her murder.

After days looking for Eveshka, Sasha drops his guard and Chernevog sends his heart to Pyetr, allowing him to freely practise magic again. In control of both Sasha and Pyetr, Chernevog directs the search for Eveshka, hoping to find her before she finds Draga, whom he knows is alive again. Draga needs Eveshka's help in overcoming Chernevog and tells her that she is pregnant with Pyetr's child. She also persuades Eveshka to start using magic. Draga had inherited magical wolves from Malenkova and she divides Eveshka's consciousness amongst them, increasing her power. When Chernevog, Sasha and Pyetr arrive at Draga's house, the wolves threaten to overwhelm Chernevog. Realizing that he cannot defeat Draga and Eveshka's magic, Chernevog retreats and the wolves and Draga follow. When they reach a nearby hill, Chernevog calls down a lightning strike that kills him, Draga and the wolves. This frees Pyetr of Chernevog's heart and Eveshka from the wolves and Draga's control.

Pyetr, Eveshka and Sasha return to their cottage where Eveshka gives birth to a daughter. But she is worried about bringing up a wizard child, knowing what it might do to them, and especially Pyetr, if it does not get its way.

== Reception ==
In a review of Chernevog in the Chicago Sun-Times, science fiction and fantasy writer Roland J. Green complemented Cherryh on her "deep historical scholarship, splendid folkloric skill, superb characterization, and ... mastery of mood-setting". A reviewer in Kirkus Reviews said that while Chernevog is "[o]bscure in places" it is "an original fantasy with fascinating characters, unique magic, and compelling plot".

== Works cited ==
- Bogstad, Janice M. (2004). "Shifting Ground: Subjectivities in Cherryh's Slavic Fantasy Trilogy". In Carmien, Edward (ed.). The Cherryh Odyssey. Wildside Press LLC. pp. 113–131. ISBN 978-0-8095-1071-9.
- Cherryh, C. J. (2012a) [1990]. Chernevog (e-book ed.). Spokane, Washington: Closed Circle Publications.
