= Vodyanoy =

Male water spirit from Slavic mythology

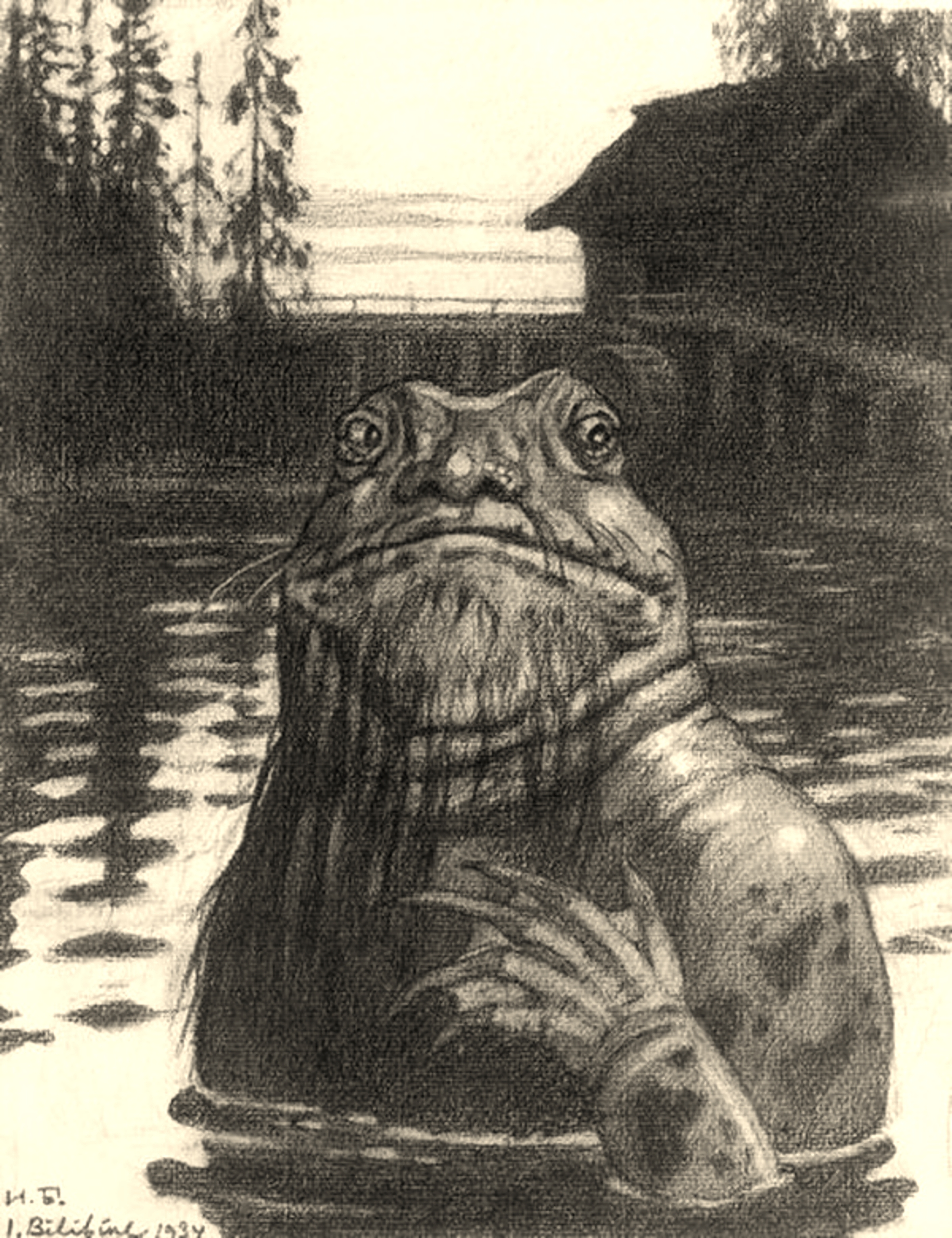
Vodyanoy by Ivan Bilibin, 1934

In Slavic mythology, vodyanoy (Russian: водяной, IPA: [vədʲɪˈnoj]; lit. '[he] from the water' or 'watery') is a water spirit. In Ukrainian fairy tales, he is called “водяник“ (vodyanyk).

In Czech and Slovak fairy tales, he is called vodník (Note: Also in Czech forms vodní muž "water-man" and diminutive vodní mužiček; Slovak vodný muž) or in Germanized form: Hastrman and often referred to as Wassermann in German sources (Note: Or Nix, Nixe, Nickel, in certain areas, e.g., Sorbian Lusatia.) (cf. § Czech and § Slovak).

In Slovene vodeni mož ("water-man"; also povodni mož Cf. § Slovene below).

Among the Croats and Serbs, such mermen are called vodeni čovek (Водени човек) or vodenjak.. (Note: Or also vodenik, Medard.)

He may appear to be a naked man with a pot belly (and bald-headed) wearing a hat and belt of reeds and rushes, conflicting with other accounts ascribing him green hair and a long green beard, while many depictions restore him as an anthropormophic frog. The varying look has been attributed in commentary to his shape-shifting ability. When angered, the vodyanoy breaks dams, washes down water mills, and drowns people and animals. Consequently, fishermen, millers, and also bee-keepers make sacrifices to appease him. The vodyanoy would sometimes drag people down to his underwater dwelling to serve him as slaves.

The vodník in Czechia or Slovakia were said to use colored ribbons (sometimes impersonating peddlers, but also tying them to grass, etc., as lures in the landscape) to attract humans near water in order to snatch them.

== Russia ==
In Russia, the vodyanoy is sometimes called the dedushka vodyanoy (Note: The transliteration has been modified from Machal's děduška vodyanoy, in Czech script, to a regular English transliteration, found elsewhere.) (Дѣдушка-водяной, "Water-Grandfather") or vodyanik (водяник).

=== Habitat ===
He is said to dwell in an omut(омут, or 'deep spot of a river or lake' (Note: Warner explains as "very deep place[s]", dictionary definition Langenscheidt's gives "whirlpool. deep place (in river or lake)".) (Note: kondratʹev's English-translated book gives "deep pools (омуты) in a river".) (Note: Though "омут" is also glossed as "whirlpool", here it must be used in some sense distinguishable from whirlpool (водоворот) that Afanasyev mentions afterwards.)), kettle hole (Котловина), i.e., any whirlpool (водоворот) of a river, pond or lake, and liked especially to live near a watermill (near the wheel or mill-dam (Note: "His favourite haunt was in the neighbourhood of mill-dams. Under the great mill-wheel many Vodyanoi would sometimes forgather.") or in the mill-streams amd mill-races). One that lurks in the deep slough (omut) is called an omutnik. One that dwells in marshlands may be called a bolotnyanik (Болотняник). (Note: "Certain kinds of water, too, were best avoided: mill-streams and mill-races where.. vodyanye cherti frisked.. whirlpools and very deep places (omut) on rivers and lakes where the omutnik lurked".)

==== Abode and stable ====
Some claim he dwells in a rich mansion among the reeds, built from river stones and shells. Others say he lives in a modest hut.

According to one description, he resides in his palace during the day, and in the evening leaves to conduct his activities outdoors, including his play slapping the water with his legs and feet. His palace is made of crystal, decorated with gold and silver recovered from sunken ships, as well as magic stones. But it may be just a giant stone chamber in the depths of the water, hidden in the reeds and sedges.

He also has maintains his herds and flock underwater, sending out his cattle, horse, pigs, and sheep to pasture on land.

=== Appearance ===
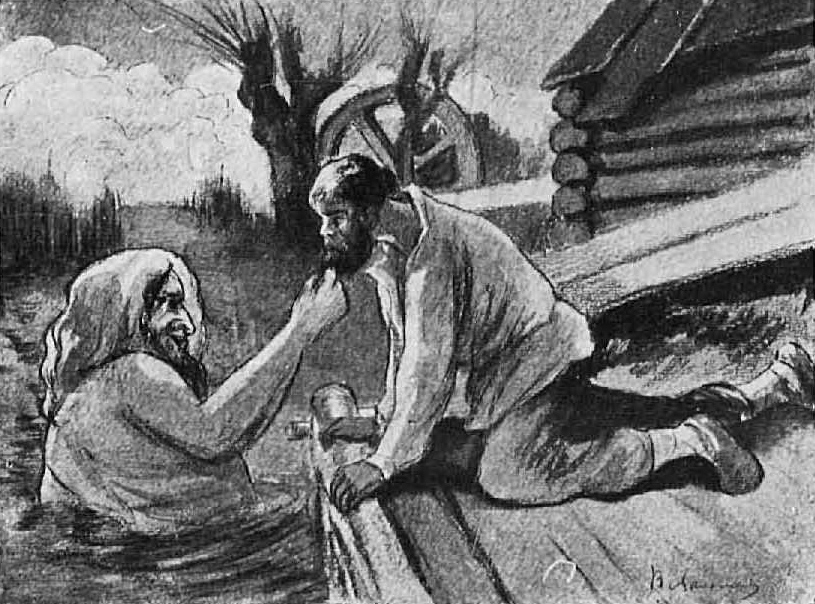
V. Malyshev. Vodyanoy, 1910

His usual appearance is that of a naked old man with a fat paunch of a belly and swollen face according to the Russian folklore collector, but a later English commentary using similar phraseology insisted the creature was not nude but bald, and concatenates additional commentary from the Russian source which says he is seen naked but covered in slime (тина), wearing a high boyar hat) made of green "club-rush" (or other sedges) (Note: Afanasyev's text identifies the plant as куга here, defined as aquatic plants of the sedge family, particularly камыш, or Scirpus spp., with common names "club-rush" or "bulrush", though the latter applies to several other species. Sedges are not a "true grass", to be botanically correct here.) and a green belt of that same "grass". (Note: Máchal: "bald-headed old man with fat belly and puffy cheeks", wearing "a high cap of reeds on his head, and a belt of rushes round his waist".A "reed" usually refers to a true grass, while a "rush" something the "rush" plant family, though "bulrush" refers to various sedge family plants.)

He is also described as a hirsute old man with green hair and (long) green beard. (Note: Afanasyev's makes (evidently his own) observation on green hair and beard (озеленыхъ волосахъ и бородѣ Máchal combines description of combing (non color-specified) hair with this latter commentary.) The green beard turns white with when the moon wanes, as the immortal Vodyanoy ages or rejuvenates with the phases of the moon.

Or, rather than wearing plant-based clothing, a different sources explain that he is covered in weeds and slime, and is scaly- (and green-) kinned in his true form. Or rather a figure of giant stature covered in grass and moss. Or be "quite black with enormous red eyes and a nose as long as a fisherman's boot". (Note: Lore claiming hairy black creature may be influenced by depiction of the devil as black-bodied in Russian icons.) Or that he is human-faced, but has huge toes, paws instead of hands, long horns, a tail, and eyes that burn like red-hot coals. Or even have a fishlike tail, and even horns, suggestive of the devil; in fact many refer to him as the "water devil" (водяной чёрт).

He has the capability of shape-shifting, which has been suggested as an explanation of its varied descriptions. He may crawl out of water in the dark of the night and comb his (green) hair on shore, but he can also appear in the form of a naked woman combing her hair. He may be heard all along the shore while he is slapping the water with his palm (ладонь, or paw) on moonlit nights.

He can appear as a (giant moss-covered) fish, a log or even a flying tree-trunk with small-wings, skimming over the water's surface.

Even if when pretends to be a normal human, the fact that the left flap of his jacket is always soggy and dripping is a dead giveaway he is a vodyanoy (a motif also found in Czech or Slovak tradition).

=== Offering and boon ===
Since he tampers with the waterwheel, the dikes, or control of water if he is not pleased, an operator of a mill must know how to have a good relationship with him. When a watermill is built, a sacrifice of pig, cattle, sheep, or even human (or a chicken) must be made to appease the vodyanik. There are reported cases of watermills destroyed by him (at Lake Ilmen for instance), and may drown a person as forewarned.

The fisherman can also benefit from the boon of the vodyanoy, receiving a bountiful harvest in their fishing nets. (Note: Máchal:" When in good humour, he drives the fish into the fisherman's net"; Afanasyev: "счастливый улов (happy catch)".) He may receive this reward after returning a child which was accidentally netted. The fishermen offer sacred libation, especially melted butter or oil (масло) into the river.

There seems to have been a cult recognizing vodyanoy as a patron saint of bee-keeping, as evidenced by the old custom of bagging the first swarm of bees and sacrificing it in water. And the bee-keeper wishing for a bounty of honey would choose the midnight hour of the feast days of Saints Zosimus and Sabbatius and dip a honeycomb into the water by the mill, while pronouncing an incantation.

He will also foretell the coming harvest. He comes into the village disguised as human, but the edge of his coat (балахон) will be visibly wet, and gives himself away. If he buys corn (grain) at a high price it forewarns spike in market price, i.e., crop failure. But if he buys at low price, the bread will remain cheap.

=== Riding beast ===
The vodyanik "owns" all the fish and aquatic creatures, and his control over them explains his ability to deliver fish. The vodyanik selects in particular the sheatfish (сом; Silurus glanis, aka "wels catfish") as his mount to ride on. But he will catch the farmers' cattle or horses (in water) and ride them till they drop dead in the wetlands. The farmer fording his livestock will make a sign of cross (emblem of Perun's weapon) over the river as protection from this happening.

=== Attacks on humans ===
The vodyanoy also posed risk of attacking people entering bodies of water, hence popular belief was to make the sign of the cross before swimming or bathing in such waters. An anecdote tells about a hunter trying to retrieve his duck, and the attack left the creature's finger-marks on his neck. In Ukraine, children were instructed to chant a certain rhyme before going bathing/swimming. (Note: "Чортокъ, чортокъ! /Не ломай кистòкъ;", etc., where chortok seems to be an appellation (for a demon).)

=== Family ===
He is known to take on a wife (or wives)—known as vodyanikha, also referred to as "water-nymph" or "water maiden" (Russian: vodyanaya deva Russian: водяная дева) or drowned and unhappy girls who have been cursed by their fathers or mothers". (Note: Máchal uses "water-nymphs". He does not give the Russian forms for this, but in a later passage glosses it as the equivalent of Czech vodní panny ("water maiden") or bílé paní ("white maiden").)

According to Afanasyev, the "water-nymph" ("water-maiden") is known by various names in Russia, including the rusalka and vodyanitsa (cf. § Vodyanitsa below). (Note: Afanasyev lists the names of the female water sprites as the moryana моряна, the vodyanitsa Водяница, Polish: lawodny žony, Macedonian/Bulgarian[?]: Dunavka дунавка, and rusalka русалка.) (Note: Uno Holmberg (1927) on Finnish mythology, writing in volume 4 of the same series as Machal, recognized the voydynoy's water-nymph as rusalka.)

It is believed that vodyanoys have a ruler: the Tsar Vodyanik, or the Vodyan Tsar. He is described as an old man armed with a club, who can rise to the sky sitting on a black cloud and create new rivers and lakes.

== Finno-Karelian ==
Although not part of the Slavic, the Finno-Urgic vetehinen ("[one] of the water") (Note: Cf. Wiktionary entry on vetehinen. The suffix -hinen is used "to form words referring to the various place guardians".) (Note: Holmberg glosses as "water-dweller".) may have its roots in the Vodyanoy, (Note: Uno Harva (Holmberg) initially writes that it is equivalent of the näkki (i.e., the Germanic Nixie), he goes on to say this comparison does not quite cover everything, and notes both the folkloric and etymological correspondence to vodyanoy, citing Castrén.)

This seems primarily/originally attested in the folk mythology of the Finno-Urgic Karelian people, (Note: Holmberg states "known originally only in Russian Karelia, Ingria, and East Finland",) accused of drowning humans in lakes, etc. The water spirits occur in both gender, male and female. In some instances, one cannot determine which sex.

But most of the time, she is a female. She may be referred to as the vetehinen or "water mistress" (Finnish: veen-emäntä). She is referred to tautologically as vezi-ved'oi, glossed as "water-vodyanitsa" (вода-водяница) locally in the Syamozero region, though the folklore narrative here attached to the water spirit is not much different from elsewhere in Karelia.

The males are considered rarer, but when they occur, they are called by such names as "aqueous" (Note: водяный=водяной, adjective meaning "aqueous, watery". Wiktionary lists водяный also as an archaic adjective for vodyanoy (in the sense of watery, given the example sentence).) (Finnish: veen, vein[?]), or a [water] spirit (Note: Russian: духом, духа воды.)(Finnish: veen haltia), or the "master of the water" (Note: Russian: хозяином воды.) (Karelian: veinizänd=Finnish: veen isäntä). (Note: Note the forest spirit is called metsänhenki or metšänizänd.)

Both the male and female are generally said to have long black hair. She may be described with various zoomorphic features, such as a fish tail or webbed feet. She may also appear as a frog, or other animals.

There is a folktale set in the Olonets Region (Olonetsky District) in Russian Karelia which tells of a vodyanoi of a lake, who required many corpses of humans and beasts to feed his large family. The locals refrained from drawing water from the lake, and were inconvenienced. He was finally driven off by the locals harassing him with holy water, choiring, and church bells. It had been recorded by Maksimov (1903).

== Czech and Slovak folklores ==
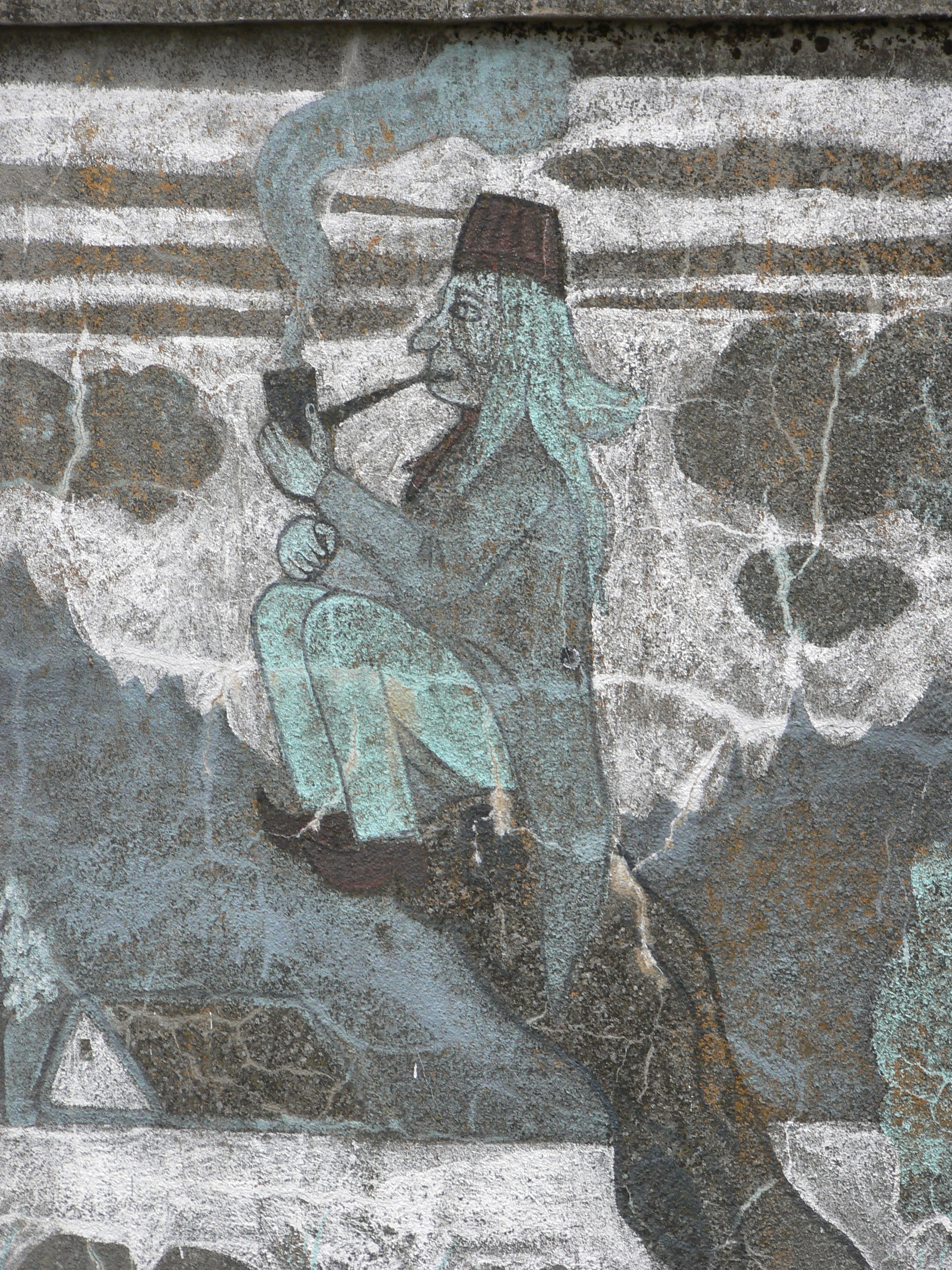
Typical projection of vodník in Czech or Slovak folklore

These water demons of West Slavic (Czech and Slovak, etc.) lore, as well as South Slavic lore (Slovenia, etc.) are similar to the East Slavic (Russian, Ukrainian, etc.) conception, though there are certain differences. The Czech and Slovak vodníci (plural of vodník) can also take on an appearance of ordinary humans, but often with water dripping from their clothing, which makes their false identity easily discernable. (Note: Grohmann and Polívka See §Czech under § Physical description and §Slovakia under § Appearances.) But their version says the demon, sometimes impersonating peddlers, use colored ribbons to lure humans. (Note: Afanasyev also notes the ribbon, citing Grohman (in Russian translation[?]), cf. German version/) Some accounts give them green color, and also long hair or beard in Slovak versions. There is an isolated Czech example of the water-demon being human-like but transforming into frog, (Note: Grohmann (1863), p. 151 , cf. §Czech under § as Frog.) but the water-demon's wife being froglike is commonplace. A widely known tale type of vodník or wife hiring a woman as godmother or housekeeper tale is found in Czech and Slovak versions. (Note: While the Liduška story with the frog wife given by Mikšíček is supposedly Czech, Grohmann offers a cognate tale with no frog wife but the waterman himself, while the "frog wife" version in Slovak (localized at Hron river) is given by Polívka, who notes it is widespread.) (Note: Polívka (1922a), p. 121, cf. §Slovakia under § Frog wives.)

Czech, Slovak (and Slovenian) tales have both evil and good watermen (relative to human beings) who do (or don't, respectively) try to drown people when they happen to swim in their territory. Vodníci would store the souls of the drowned inside pots, and the liberated souls can ascend to heaven, or even revive.

== Czech ==
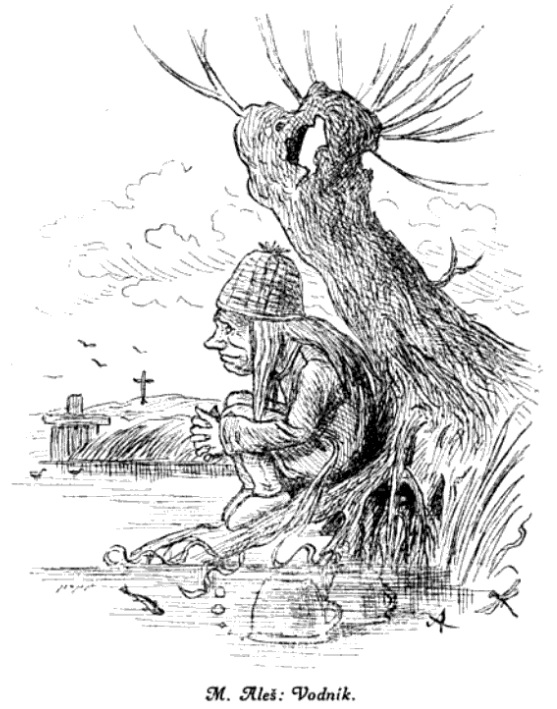
Vodník ―Illustr. Mikoláš Aleš (1921)

The Bohemian male water demon came to be called vodník or hastrman, but their ancient names have not been found in older sources. It dwells in every river, stream, or pond. Though several may share a body of water, they keep themselves apart since they are antagonistic towards each other. Sometimes the vodník enters into a loving relationship with a human woman, and will live together with the family he has formed, but otherwise the bachelors are solitary. Those in the pond are considered more feral, living amongst the reeds, but those in the river are believed to live in crystal palaces in a whole expansive world found underwater, where they keep the souls of the drowned dead, inside pots.

There are also a tale and a legend concerning the hastrman or vodnik living near mills.

=== Physical description ===
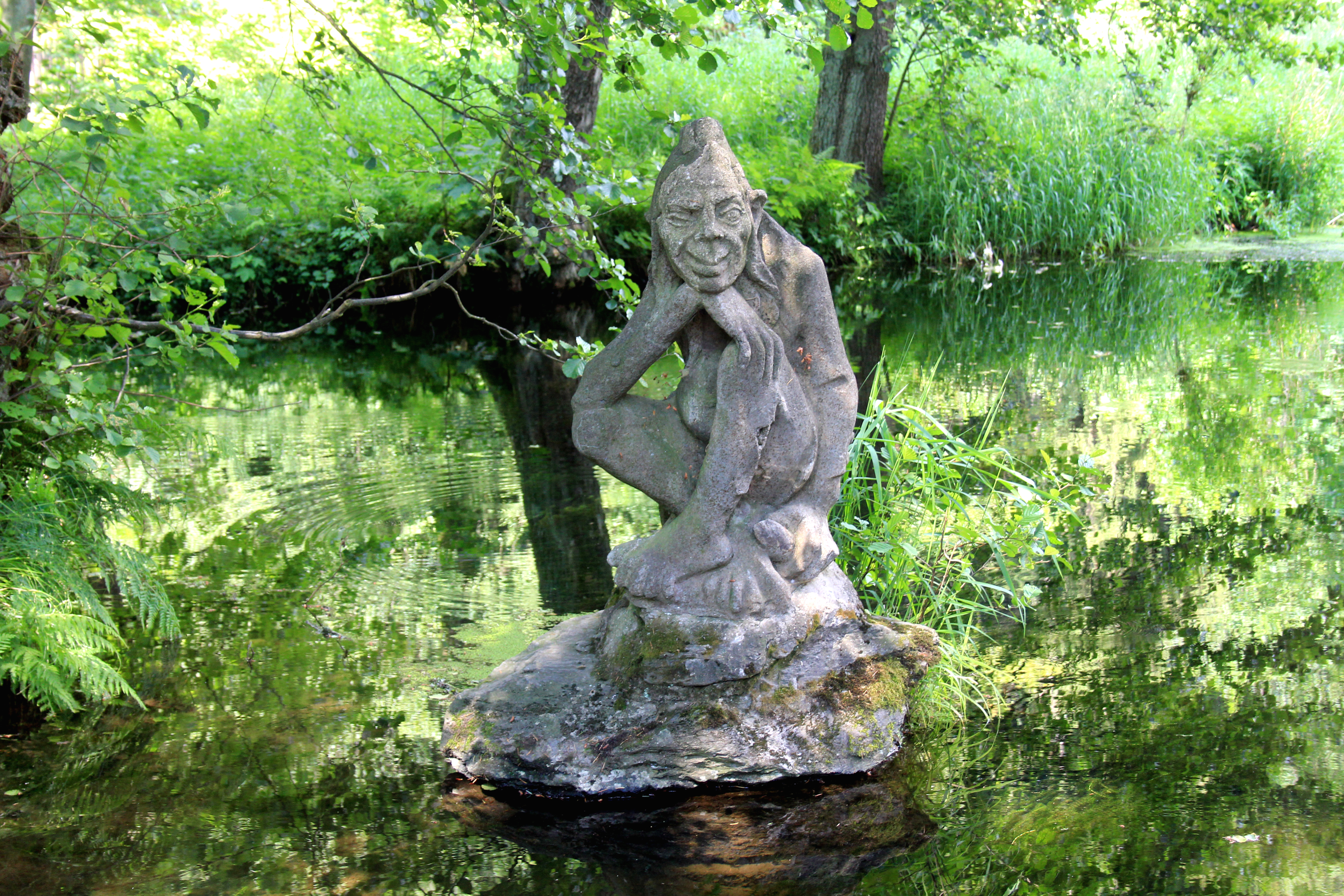
Czech vodník statue —at Peklo on the outskirts north of Nové Město nad Metují and Jestřebí, Náchod District in the northern Czech Republic. By Josef Marek (1960)

The net-casting vodník (cf. § Man-snatching below) is described as a green man, and comes out of the water combing his green hair on a day he does not hunt drowning victims. But in several accounts he manifests himself as an ordinary human being (cf. § As frogs), or the peddler by the pond north of Přeštice, wearing a dripping wet coat. He is known as the "green man" at the market, appearing like an ordinary man wearing a green coat, with the left coat-tip (šos) always wet, and also missing the thumb on his left hand. The merchants welcome him because when he makes purchases, business does well.

=== Man-snatching ===
The vodník lures people into the water to drown them, and those who bathe after hours are especially vulnerable, but he can only drown those who were fated to die that way. Fishermen were afraid of saving a drowning man from the clutches of a vodník, because they would come in a bad way and wind up being drowned themselves.

In one version the water demon spans a fine invisible net across the river to trap people. But he sits in the grass mending his nets on Friday, his day off from man-snatching.

The peddler vodník displays some sort of trinkets hanging on a rack in order to lure his prey into water. Most especially the peddler (kramář) vodník uses the colorful ribbon (Czech: stuha, pl. stuhy; pentle or its dim. pentlička (Note: stužka, diminutive of stuha occurs in Slovak tales of tale with the butcher (Slovak: mäsiar). And in the Liduška story, the Czech: mašle signifies "ribbon" (cog. German Masche), though translated as "flower".) to lure humans, according to numerous accounts. In the Podskalí Quarter of Prague, the vodník was seen on a raft (vor, pl. locative vorách) in the evenings, and he hangs red ribbons over the water to lure children and drag them down. (Note: Erben, posthumous (1874), also cited as "Slavia I, seš. 3, str. 4".) A vodník in the guise of a red-haired man wearing green peddled green ribbons to a village woman, but the goods turned into grass when she returned home. (Note: Concerns a village woman from Balda, Czechia near Polička. Slavia 3: 8, also cited by Košťál (1892), pp. 53–54.)

The vodník or hastrman maintains a collection of captured souls inside pots in his underwater palace or mansion, as in the tale localized in Moldautein (Týn nad Vltavou), here specified as "earthenware" (German: irdenen) pots also filled with water. Here a poor day-laborer woman's eldest daughter becomes the Hastermann's servant, and when she sweeps, the dust she collects is gold. She liberates a soul from a noisy jar, which turns out to be her brother. She is forgiven, but after serving many years, homesickness hardens her decision to flee, and she frees all the souls on departure. The hastrmann pursues but she returns home to her siblings. (Note: Compare basic plotline with godmother Liduška story below, and the Grimms' "Der Wassermann und der Bauer", listed as a German Bohemian tale, taken down orally.)

=== As frogs ===
In a Bohemian version of the butcher tale, (Note: There is a similarly plotted Slovak tale ("Vodník u mäsiara"), except there is no frog metamorphosis that occurs, and the butcher meets his doom being pushed into a water tank during the rain.) a man from Předměřice was really a vodník, regularly shopping from a butcher at Tuřice, but the out-of-town man's habit of pointing the finger at the piece of meat he wanted annoyed the butcher into cutting a finger off one day. But two days later, he was taking the valley path along the Iser (Jizera) and encountered a huge frog which the curious butcher, but it turned into the client he maimed and dragged the butcher into water.

Matěj Mikšíček recorded a tale about the pregnant wife of a vodník (vodníkova žena) in frog form, which compelled a housekeeper named Liduška to be its child's godmother, though this tale type has been discussed elsewhere as a widely disseminated piece of Slovak folklore (see § Frog wives under §Slovakia). In this Moravian version (but recorded in Bohemian dialect[?]), the vodník returns from his absence in the guise of a red ribbon (červené mašle), (Note: Though renderd as "red flower" by the English translator.) attempting to lure and snatch Liduška, just as he is wont to do with girls with rakes haymaking on meadows by the river.

But in Jungbunzlau (Mladá Boleslav) it was rumored the water demon maintained two castles on the Iser (Jizera), one by the mill, and other by the brickhouse. At mill was seen a vodník who was completely green, and covered with filamentous green algae; (Note: German text Wasserfänden lit. "water-threads", glossed as Conferva sp. of algae.) at the other abode was seen the vodník's wife, half maiden, half fish.

== Slovak ==
In Slovakia, the same water demon may be called vodný chlap meaning "water guy" or "waterman". The water spirit may also be called a molek (var. molok (Note: Kálal dictionary, cited by Valentsova.)). There is a story of a localized in a lake in the forest of Dolný Kubín in Orava, where a peasant encounters a waterman (from a lake in Kriváň (village)) pursuing another waterman who stole his wife, guiding him to the lake of the perpetrator. The peasant watches as an underwater fight ensues, culminating in bubbling froth turning red, signaling a bad outcome, and the peasant flees as forewarned.

Slovak folklore also speak of the vodník's pot (vodníkove hrnce), attested in the former Trencsén County (now Trenčín Region or Trenčín District), and anecdotally, in the northwestern village of Boky (now attached to Budča) a stream was home to a vodný ("aquatic" man) who purchased pots to trap souls inside.

=== Appearances ===
Also according to Boky lore, the vodník had a long beard, and would be naked one moment, then be wearing a blouse (halena) dripping water from its side. Some say a vodník can be identified because the left side of his coat (kabát) is always dripping wet. Some ascribe long flowing hair, or blazing eyes as large as dishes (tanier). It allegedly appeared out of the stream in the form of a "little green boy", according to one witness.

The boatmen on the Váh claim to have witnessed the vodník looking like a man with the head of a black ram, though another that was spotted had green hair and clothing.

The vodník are said to employ ribbons to lure humans (as in Czech regions), according to lore found in the Bratislava area and Nitra in western Slovakia.

=== Frog wives ===
The wife of a vodník (vodníkova žena) is said to have the appearance of a frog. There is an anecdote of one that transformed into a frog and went to the home of the plowman (oráč) where it was feasted, then entertained him in her own abode. In a more intricate but widespread tale, the froglike being with a swollen belly is met by a woman washing in the river Hron, who offers to be the godmother of the unborn child. A servant (drowned man) arrives with news a girl was born, and conveys the godmother to the vodník's home, hidden under the stairs beneath river boulder, which the man splits open with a magic wand. The vodník's wife instructs the woman to sweep and take home the sweepings (which later turn out to be gold and silver), but not to touch the covered pots. (Note: pl. hrnce, of hrnec.) The godmother disobeys and overturns a pot revealing a soul had been captured inside. Then in a double pot she finds the soul of her two drowned children, who tells her they were thus captured by the vodník and could not ascend to heaven. She takes her children's souls in the pot and makes an escape; thereafter, the river throws up the children's bodies, and they breathe back to life.

This tale type is classed as ATU subtype (Note: Subtype of ATU 476 "Coal Turns into Gold") 476* "In the Frog House", where the type example is a Hungarian folktale, which was incorrectly given as the only variant in the original 1961 publication of the index, but later revised with the listing of Bulgarian and Polish cognate tales, and Slovene and other comparisons as well.

== Slovene ==
Similar lore is recorded from Slovenia or (Slovene-speaking areas elsewhere) regarding The Slovene water-spirit or povodni mož (lit. 'around-water-man'), also known as vódni mož, vodovnik, etc.)

The povodni mož fits the mold of the Slavic waterman in § Appearance, for he is described as large and green colored, with a scaly or hairy body, wearing green coat. He is perhaps more colorfully dressed, as he dons a red hat, multi-colored trousers, and shoes of glass or silver, according to folklorist Monika Kropej. (Note: Kropej (2012), p. 158 citing Popotnik IV, no. 10, 1883, pp. 153–155 merely covers the instance where the water sprite appears as an old beggar.)

In Slovenia and adjoining Slovenian regions, he could be called by other names such as povodnják, jézernik ("laker"), vodéni človek (lit. 'water person', vodnár (Note: Also muk, motovílec (lit. 'cornsalad, mâche'), mitál, váncaš and mámalić.)

Gestrin (var. gastrin) is a particular name given to the water man of Drava River. while Salmsonar (var. selémsonar)) is a water spirit of the Gorica/Gorizia region.

In a tale which describes the povodni mož as dwelling in the Sava (stretching from White Carniola down south to Upper Carniola), and tells of the waterman's abduction of a shepherdess girl from a place called Čajnarjih deep in the Sava, and set her up as wife in his house of glass (Note: steklén<steklo,) (cf. crystal palace motif above). When she swept the house, she would collect gold (also motif seen above), which the waterman would carry to her family back on land, and bring back news. But he would not allow the homesick woman to visit her parents herself. One day she crafted a dressed up straw doll to pretend to be her, and sneaked into the basket the waterman was carrying to her parents. And by this ruse he made her escape from his clutches.

Similar to the § Slovak narrative about a peasant spectating the "Bout between a vodník and another" is such a tale set in the Black Lake (Črno jezero) of Upper Carniola, witnessed by a shepherd. A variant tale from Lake Bohinj where the local charcoal burner is invited by a podlesnjak (wild man of the forest) to observe the outcome of his fight against the povodnjak (aka podni mož) underwater, but the red foam rather than white indicated the forest wild man's defeat.

A number of tales relate how the Slovene water sprite may move its haunt from one body of water to another, depending on how well (poorly) the local people treat the creature, e.g. in one piece of legend, he vbvailed out of a pond above Maribor, and using the Drava River as conduit, emigrated all the way to the Black Lake (Črno jezero). Though there also occurs the etiological tale explaining how the Black Lake got transmigrated to its current place by the water spirit. (Note: One etiological tale attributes the formation of the Black Lake to a mass of land that was shaved off the Pohorje range, though the being instrumental in it is the devil rather than the water spirit. The devil had intended to use the land mass to plug a vale, in ordered to cause the near-damned townsfolk of Maribor.) Another folktale tells how the povodni mož moved a lake from Mount Uršlja Gora to the Pohorje range.

== Companion spirits ==
=== Bolotnik ===
Bolotnik (Russian: болотник) is the owner of the swamp. He is often considered a relative of the vodyanoy and the leshy. There are many descriptions of him, but most often he was imagined as an old man with long green beard and his body covered in fish scales and algae. The bolotnik is dangerous, and he would pose an especially huge threat to those who play shepherd's pipe at night. In order to lure the person to the swamp, he would parody the sounds of various animals, create wandering lights and grow intoxicating plants. This spirit is often said to be a loner, although in some beliefs he has a wife, a bolotnitsa.

=== Vodyanitsa ===
Vodyanitsa (Russian: водяница) is a beautiful, black-haired (or say green-haired) water maiden, and she is often said to be the wife of a vodyanoy. The Vodyanitsy (plural: Russian: водяницы) prefer deep pools (omut омуты) in forests, the vicinity of the watermills as their chosen homes.

She is a female spirit, considered to be the ghost of a drowned woman, but according to some beliefs, the main difference between the vodyanitsa and other water spirits is that strictly only a baptized woman who drowned will become a vodyanitsa.

The term is often used synonymously for rusalka. She is also known as a shutikha (шутиха) or shutovka (шутовка, both lit. 'female jester'), representing mischievous spirits. (Note: Some sources add that the vodyanitsa is responsible for damaging fishermen's nets and ruining millstones. But the language used is closely similar to the commentary on the rusalka in the writings of S. V. Maksimov (1903).)

=== Topielec ===
In Polish folklore there is the topielec ("Drowner") which is considered an analogue.

== Cultural references ==
- The first Slovene ballad, written in 1826 by the Slovene national poet France Prešeren, was titled "The Water Man" (Povodni mož). It is about Urška, a flirt from Ljubljana, who ended up in the hands of a handsome man who turned out to be a vodyanoy. The poem is based on a story from The Glory of Carniola, about a dance at Old Square in Ljubljana in July 1547, when Urška Šefer was enchanted by a vodyanoy and tugged to the Ljubljanica.
- Composer Antonín Dvořák wrote a symphonic poem entitled Vodník (1896) about this creature, who is also a character in his opera Rusalka.
- Karel Jaromír Erben's poem "Vodník" is the ninth poem of his Kytice collection, and inspired Dvořák to compose the above-mentioned symphonic poem.
- The 1974 Czechoslovak comedy film about the end of vodníks in Bohemia, How to Drown Dr. Mracek, the Lawyer (Jak utopit dr. Mráčka aneb Konec vodníků v Čechách).
- David Wiltshire's novel Child of Vodyanoi (1978, adapted into the TV series The Nightmare Man) used the water spirit as a metaphor for a miniature Russian submarine.
- Vodyanoy is one of the best known characters of the Soviet cartoons. In the Soviet animated film The Flying Ship (1979), he sings about his loneliness and need to talk with someone.
- A vodyanoi named Hwiuur features in C. J. Cherryh's Russian novel trilogy, Rusalka (1989), Chernevog (1990), and Yvgenie (1991).
- In China Miéville's Bas-Lag novels, the Vodyanoi are an aquatic people skilled in water-based magic. In Miéville's Perdido Street Station (2000), Vodyanoi dockworkers go on strike and use their magic to blockade a river shipping route.
- An aging vodnik is the main character of the novel Hastrman by Czech writer Miloš Urban published in 2001. The novel won the Magnesia Litera prize for literature in 2002. A Czech film based on the first part of the novel was produced in 2018.
- Vodnik is the main character in the 2013 thriller Croaker, written and directed by Pittsburgh area filmmaker Fred Terling.
- A Vodyanoy features early in Larry Correia's 2017 novel Monster Hunter Siege.
- A Vodník appeared as an antagonist in episode 3 of the animated Netflix series Legend Quest, where it terrorized a village by stealing the souls of children.
- A Vodyanoy is a spirit partner to a Russian shaman named Zria Gagarik in the manga and anime series Shaman King.
- The Ghosts of Rose Hill features a vodnik named Rudolf Wasserman as its primary antagonist.

=== In games ===
- The Vodyanoi appears as a monster in Dungeons & Dragons. It is described as a variety of Umber hulk.
- The Witcher video game (2007) portrays a race of water creatures called the vodyanoi, also known as the Fishpeople. Drowners are also referred to as Vodniks.
- Vodyanoy appears as a playable dragon in the 2018 Nintendo game Dragalia Lost.
- A Water-attribute monster called the Vodianoi appears in the 2003 FromSoftware game Lost Kingdoms II.
- A ship called Vodianoy entered Call of Duty: Warzone at the start of Season 2, bringing zombies to Warzone once more, and potentially hinting at the oncoming destruction of Gora Dam.
- Vodyanoi are depicted as small winged frog monsters in Lionheart: Legacy of the Crusader. They are commonly found near the coast and rivers.
- In Kingdom Come: Deliverance II, there is a side-quest in which the player may find the rumored treasure hoard of a vodník. In the English localization it is referred to as a "water goblin".
- In Warframe there is a character named Victor Vodyanoi who works with Neci Rusalka. They seem to be the leaders of the Scaldra faction as introduced in the Warframe 1999 update
- In Genshin Impact, there is a character named Vodyanitsa, a siren Fae who is the Prima Soprano of the Snezhnaya-based Korolevskiy Troupe.

== See also ==
- Bolotnik – Slavic spirit of the marshes and tutelary deity
- Grindylow – Water spirit in English folklore
- Kappa (folklore) – Japanese mythical creature
- Lazavik – Belarusian mythology creature
- Merman
- Sea Tsar
- Su iyesi – Water spirit in Turkic mythology
- Topielec – Slavic spirits of water
- Nixie – Being in Germanic folklore
