= Kupala =

Slavic deity

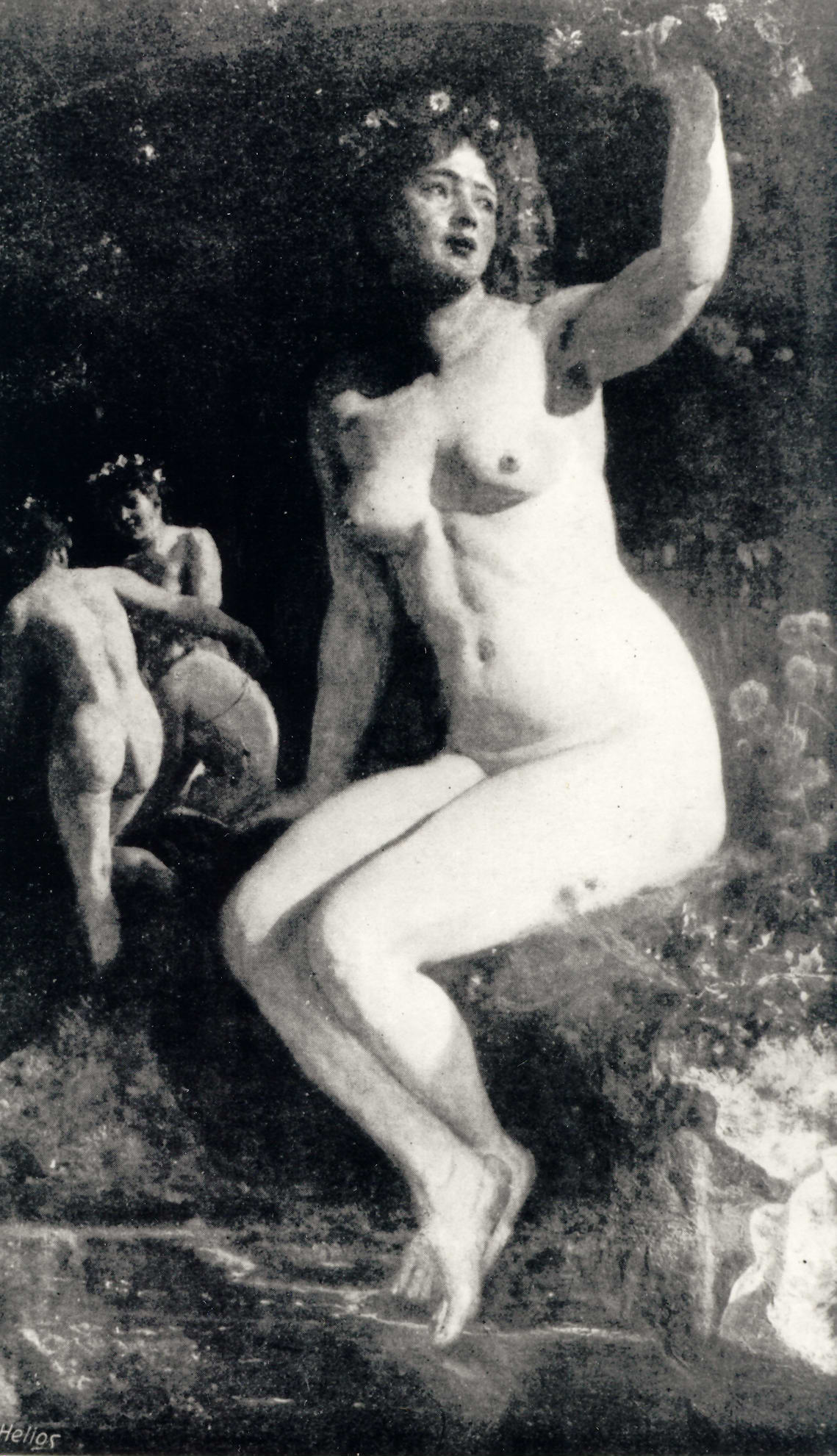
Kupała, Wojciech Gerson, 1897

Kupala or Kupalo is an alleged Slavic deity who was first mentioned in the 17th century and compared to the Greek goddess Ceres. However, modern scholars of Slavic mythology deny the existence of such a deity.

== Sources ==
The first source that mentions the deity Kupalo is the Hustyn Chronicle dating back to the 17th century:

The fifth Kupalo was, as I believe, the God of Abundance, like Ceres for the Greeks, To him, the foolish people gave thanks during harvest-tide. The commemoration of this demon Kupalo is still being celebrated in some of our lands by the foolish, from the 23rd of June, the eve of the birth of St. John the Baptist, up to the harvest and longer in the following way: in the evening, the plain folk of both sexes come together, and they wind wreaths from edible herbs or from roots. When they have wound the herbs around themselves, they light a fire. In another place, they erect a green branch and, holding hands, they circle around this fire, singing their songs in which Kupalo is mentioned. Then they jump over the aforesaid fire, dedicating themselves to this demon.

– Hustyn Chronicle

In the 17th century, Kupala is also recognized as a deity by the Kievan Synopsis and the Life of St. Vladimir.

== Historicity and interpretations ==
Modern researchers usually deny the existence of a Slavic deity named Kupala. According to Vladimir Toporov, mythological figures known from later sources, such as Yarilo, Kupala, Pogvizd, Lada, Polel and others, cannot be considered gods. Folklorist and ethnographer Andrey Toporkov stated that Kupalo was only a folk holiday, and that recognizing him as a deity is questionable. According to Stanislaw Urbańczyk, Kupala is "literary fiction, persistently upheld by mythologists as truth." There is no information about the deity in earlier sources mentioning the Kupala Night celebrations.

Some researchers, such as Martin Pitro and Petr Vokáč, and Linda Ivantis, believe that Kupalo was not a deity, but a ritual figure or effigy used during Kupala Night. Source material confirms the existence of effigies with such a name, e.g. Ukrainian dial. kupalo "ritual effigy, used in Saint John's Eve celebrations," or Belarusian dial. kupala "person leading the way in Saint John's Eve games."

== Bibliography ==
- Kleinhempel, Ullrich R.; Klimov, Igor O. (2022). "Seeking the fern flower on Ivan Kupala (St. John's Night)". In Chatalic, Molly; Yue, Yue (eds.). Herbs and the Evolution of Human Societies. Cambridge Scholars Publishing. ISBN 978-1-5275-7970-5.
- Holobuts’ky, Volodymyr O.; Karadobri, Tetyana A. (2009). "Купала, Купайло". Encyclopedia of History of Ukraine (in Ukrainian). Vol. 5. Valeriy A. Smoliy (red.). Kyiv: Наукова Думка. p. 499. ISBN 978-966-00-0855-4.
- Ivantis, Linda J. (1989). Russian Folk Belief. ME Sharpe, Inc. ISBN 0873324226.
- Pitro, Martin; Vokáč, Petr (2002). Bohové dávných Slovanů (in Czech). Praga: ISV. ISBN 80-85866-91-9.
- Sławski, Franciszek (1969). "kupała". Słownik etymologiczny języka polskiego. Vol. 3. Kraków: Towarzystwo Miłośników Języka Polskiego.
- Toporkov, Andrey L. (2002). "Кабинетная мифология". In Tolstaya, Svetlana M. (ed.). Славянская мифология: Энциклопедический словарь (in Russian). Moscow: Международные отношения.
- Toporov, Vladimir N. (1995). "Боги". In Tolstoy, Nikita I. (ed.). Славянские древности: Этнолингвистический словарь (in Russian). Vol. 1. Moscow: Международные отношения. pp. 348–352. ISBN 5-7133-0704-2.
- Urbańczyk, Stanisław (1991). Dawni Słowianie. Wiara i kult. Wrocław: Ossolineum.
