= Rusalka =

Nymph in Slavic folklore

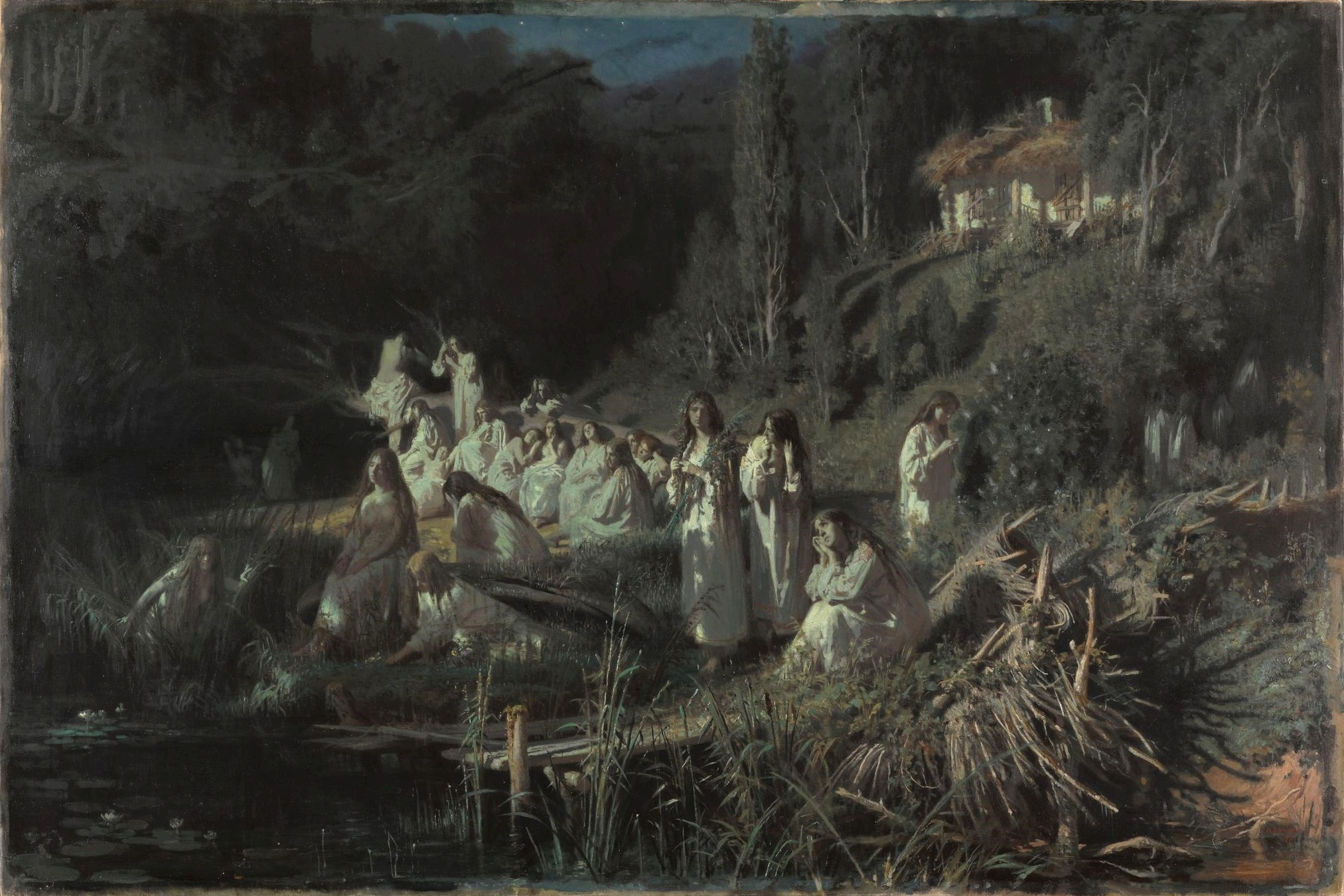
Ivan Kramskoi, Rusalki ("The Mermaids"), 1871

In Slavic folklore, the rusalka (plural: rusalki; Cyrillic: русалка, Russian pronunciation: [rʊˈsaɫkə], plural: русалки; Polish: rusałka, plural: rusałki) is a female entity, often malicious toward mankind and frequently associated with water. It has counterparts in other parts of Europe, such as the French Melusine and the Germanic Nixie. Folklorists have proposed a variety of origins for the entity, including that they may originally stem from Slavic paganism, where they may have been seen as benevolent spirits. Rusalki appear in a variety of media in modern popular culture, particularly in Slavic language-speaking countries, where they frequently resemble the concept of the mermaid.

In northern Russia, the rusalka was also known by various names such as the vodyanitsa (or vodyanikha/vodyantikha; Russian: водяница, водяниха, водянтиха; lit. "she from the water" or "the water maiden"), kupalka (Russian: купалка; "bather"), shutovka (Russian: шутовка; "joker", "jester" or "prankster") and loskotukha (or shchekotukha, shchekotunya; Russian: лоскотуха, щекотуха, щекотунья; "tickler" or "she who tickles"). In Ukraine, the rusalka was called a mavka. Those names were more common until the 20th century, and the word rusalka was perceived by many people as bookish, scholarly.

== Etymology ==
The term "Rusalka" derives from "rusalija" (Church Slavonic: рѹсалиѩ, Old East Slavic: русалиꙗ, Bulgarian: русалия, Serbo-Croatian Cyrillic: русаље) which entered Slavic languages, via Byzantine Greek "rousália" (Medieval Greek: ῥουσάλια), from the Latin "Rosālia" as a name for Pentecost and the days adjacent to it. Long-standing, likely pre-Christian, annual traditions resulted in that time of year being associated with spirits (navki, mavki) which were subsequently named for the holiday.

== Origin and appearance ==
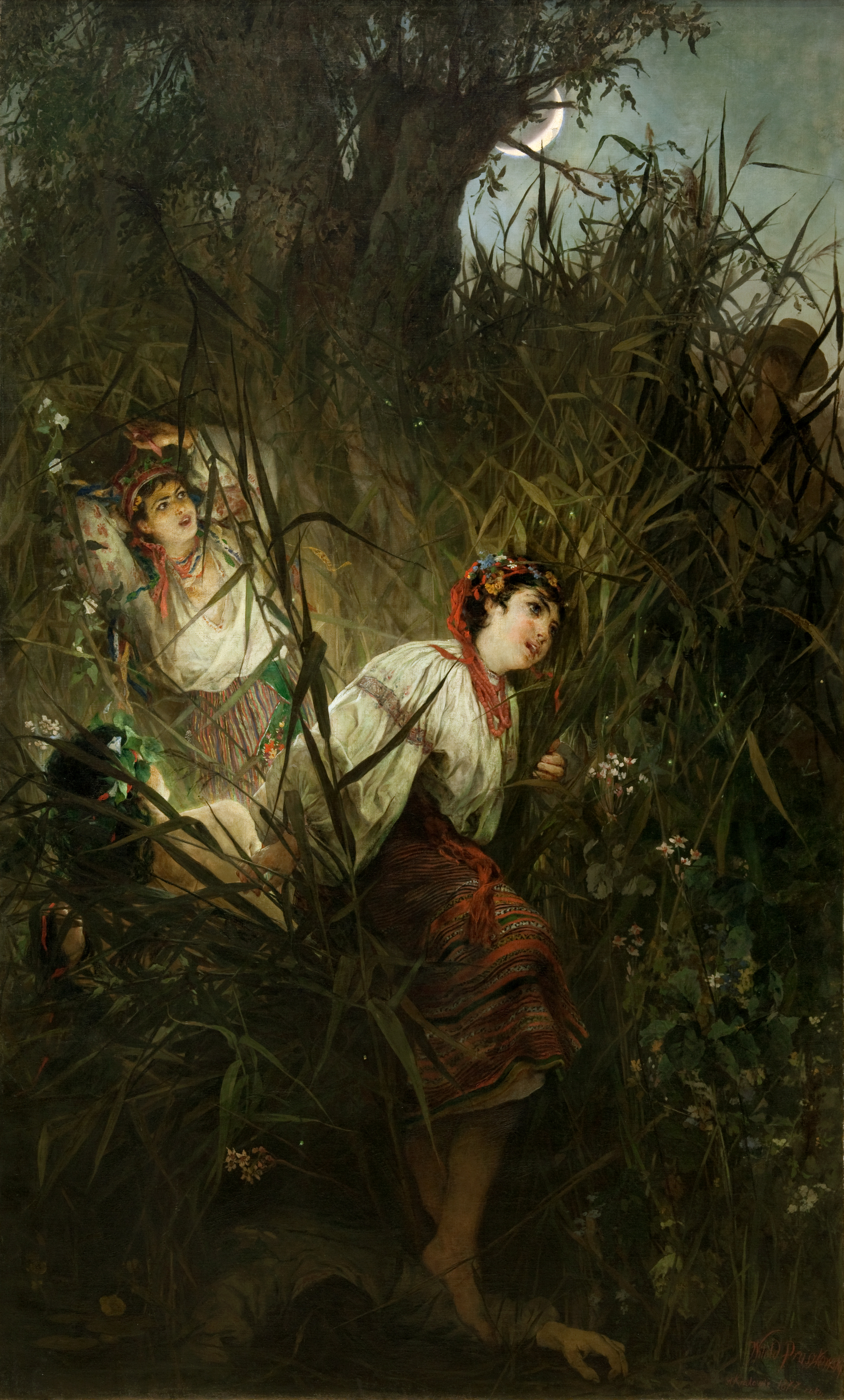
Witold Pruszkowski Rusałki, 1877

According to Vladimir Propp, the original "rusalka" was an appellation used by pagan Slavic peoples, who linked them with fertility and did not consider rusalki evil before the 19th century. They came out of the water in the spring to transfer life-giving moisture to the fields and thus helped nurture the crops.

In 19th-century versions, a rusalka is an unquiet, dangerous being who is no longer alive, associated with the unclean spirit. According to Dmitry Zelenin, young women, who either committed suicide by drowning due to an unhappy marriage (they might have been jilted by their lovers or abused and harassed by their much older husbands) or who were violently drowned against their will (especially after becoming pregnant with unwanted children), must live out their designated time on Earth as rusalki. However, the initial Slavic lore suggests that not all rusalki occurrences were linked with death from water.

It is accounted by most stories that the soul of a young woman who had died in or near a river or a lake would come back to haunt that waterway. This undead rusalka is not invariably malevolent, and would be allowed to die in peace if her death is avenged. Her main purpose is, however, to lure young men, seduced by either her looks or her voice, into the depths of said waterways where she would entangle their feet with her long hair and submerge them. Her body would instantly become very slippery and not allow the victim to cling on to her body in order to reach the surface. She would then wait until the victim had drowned, or, on some occasions, tickle them to death, as she laughed. It is also believed, by a few accounts, that rusalki can change their appearance to match the tastes of men they are about to seduce, although a rusalka is generally considered to represent universal beauty, therefore is highly feared yet respected in Slavic culture.

In most beliefs rusalki always have loose hair, which can be linked to Slavic traditions of unwedded maidens having unbraided or loosely braided hair which, once married, is tightly braided and worn under a headdress. According to Dal's Explanatory Dictionary, the expression "Walks like a rusalka" (Russian: Ходит, как русалка) is applied to girls with unkempt hair. The hair of the rusalka can be fair, black, greenish or completely green.

== Variations ==
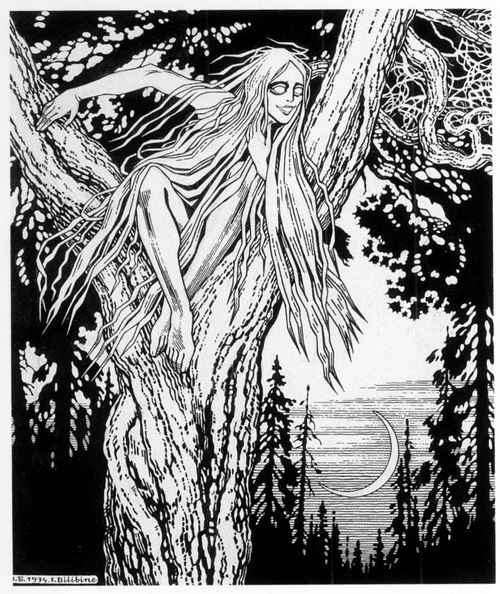
Rusalka by Ivan Bilibin, 1934

While lore often said that the rusalki could not stand completely out of water, some works of fiction told of rusalki that could climb trees and sing songs, sit on docks with only their feet submerged, comb their hair, or even join other rusalki in circle dances in fields. A particular feature of such stories revolves around the fact that this behaviour was limited to only certain periods of the year, usually the summer (see Rusalka Week section).

=== Region-specific ===
Specifics pertaining to rusalki differed among regions. In most tales they lived without men. In stories from Ukraine, they were often linked with water. In Belarus they were linked with the forest and field. They were usually pictured as beautiful naked maidens, but in some areas they were imagined as hideous and hairy. They were said to tickle men to death. According to some Russian beliefs, rusalki had the appearance of very pale little girls with green hair and long arms. In other beliefs, they were described as naked girls with light brown hair.

In Poland and Czech Republic, water rusalki/rusalky were younger and fair-haired, while the forest ones looked more mature and had black hair – but in both cases, if someone looked up close, their hair turned green, and the faces became distorted. They killed their victims by tickling them to death or forcing them to participate in a frenzied dance. In Polish folklore, the term rusalka could also stand for boginka, dziwożona and various other entities.

== Rusalka week ==
The rusalki were believed to be at their most dangerous during the 'Rusalka week' (Russian: Русальная неделя, romanized: Rusalnaya nedelya) in early June. At this time, they were supposed to have left their watery depths in order to swing on branches of birch and willow trees by night. Swimming during this week was strictly forbidden, lest mermaids drag a swimmer down to the river bed. A common feature of the celebration of Rusalnaya was the ritual banishment or burial of the rusalki at the end of the week, which remained as entertainment in Russia, Belarus, and Ukraine until the 1930s.

== Known rusalki ==
- Dana. A vodyanitsa mentioned in Russian folktale. Her wicked stepmother envied her beauty. Once they went to swim near the water mill, and the stepmother drowned Dana. Dana had a groom, a young knyaz. He longed for his late bride, and often came to the place of her death. One day he stayed late into the night, and saw how beautiful maidens began to jump on the mill wheels, laughing and combing their long green hair with white combs. Seeing Dana among them, the knyaz rushed to her, but the rusalka had already jumped into the water. The knyaz dived after her, but got entangled in her hair, falling into the underwater palace. Dana told him to get out as soon as possible if he wanted to return, otherwise it would be too late and he would die. The groom replied that he could not live without her and would not go anywhere. Dana kissed him, after which he became the water king of that river.
- Kostroma. A spring-summer ritual character, as well as a fertility goddess associated with rusalkas and mavkas. According to myth, she drowned herself in a lake when she discovered that her newlywed husband, Kupalo, was her brother. She lured every man who met her into the watery abyss. Later, the gods took pity on the rusalka, and turned her and Kupalo into a single flower.
- Marina. A young widow from the old Simbirsk legend who drowned herself in the river Volga out of love for Ivan Curchaviy and became a rusalka. It was said that she was able to take the form of a swan when she swam. She was also spotted flipping boats along with a vodyanoy named Volnok. Marina often sat on the shore, sadly looking at the house of her lover, who had married another girl. As a result, she managed to charm Ivan and take him under the water, where they began to live happily.
- Moryana. The sea vodyanitsa and the daughter of the Morskoy Tsar. She was usually described as an incredibly beautiful, often very tall maiden with disheveled hair that looked like sea foam. Most of the time she swam deep in the waters, taking the form of a fish, and came ashore only at the evenings. She was also believed to be the ruler of the sea winds. She could be either good or bad, eliminating storms in the first case and causing them in the second. Sometimes the marine species of vodyanitsy in general were named after her.

== Modern depictions of rusalki ==
Regarding representations of the rusalka in modern popular culture, folklorist Natalie Kononenko says, "the currently dominant presents her as something like a mermaid, though she is pictured as having legs rather than a fish tail ... The current view of the rusalka as a seductive or seduced woman was probably influenced by written literature. In the past, her image was more complex and she more closely resembled a nature spirit, found not only near water but in fields, forests, and mountains, rather like the vila ...".

=== List of notable works featuring rusalki ===
- 1829 – "Rusalka", a short story of Orest Somov (translated into English and published in 2016).
- 1831 – Rusalka, a poem by Mikhail Lermontov.
- 1856 – Rusalka, an opera by Alexander Dargomyzhsky.
- 1895 – Roussalka, an unfinished opera by Henri Duparc.
- 1901 – Rusalka, an opera by Antonín Dvořák.
- 1908 – Su Anasy (tat. Су анасы; literary Water Mother, in Russian translation Vodyanaya), a poem by Tatar poet Ğabdulla Tuqay.
- 1911 – The Forest Song, a poetic play in three acts by Lesya Ukrainka.
- 1943 – Nikolai Medtner's Third Piano Concerto, based on Mikhail Lermontov's ballad.
- 1979 – The Merman's Children by Poul Anderson had a rusalka as the lover of one of the main characters.
- 1989 – Rusalka, a fantasy novel (part of The Rusalka trilogy of novels by C. J. Cherryh), features and revolves around a rusalka named Eveshka.
- 1990 – Tigana by Guy Gavriel Kay, in which riselka, the supernatural creature, which occurrence suggests the future, is inspired by rusalka.
- 1991 – The Boat House by Stephen Gallagher, a novel in which a rusalka flees her homeland and attempts to settle in the English Lakes.
- 1993 – Quest for Glory: Shadows of Darkness, which draws upon Slavic mythology, features a rusalka; Paladin characters have the option to avenge her murder and let her move on to the afterlife.
- 1996 – Rusalka, a short film directed by Aleksandr Petrov and animated using his paint-on-glass animation technique.
- 1996 – "To This Water (Johnstown, Pennsylvania 1889)", a short story by Caitlín R. Kiernan.
- 1999–2015 – In some Slavic localizations of the American computer game series Heroes of Might and Magic, various entities are named after rusalka. In the Polish localizations of the third, fifth, and seventh games in the series, as well as Might and Magic VII, "sprites" are renamed to "rusałka", whereas in the Russian localizations of the third, fourth, sixth, and seventh games, as well as Might and Magic X, "mermaids" are renamed to "русалка".
- 2005 – The Rusalka Cycle: Songs Between the Worlds is a performance piece and CD by the California-based women's vocal group Kitka.
- 2006 - "Urchins, While Swimming", a short story by Catherynne Valente, published in Clarkesworld Magazine.
- 2006 – A cycle of creatures in the trading card game Magic: the Gathering called Rusalka are printed in the Guildpact expansion.
- 2008 – In the video game Castlevania: Order of Ecclesia, a rusalka appears as the fifth boss, shown as an aquatic demon.
- 2012 – Rusalka is the name of a water nymph-like boss fought in the Nintendo 3DS video game Bravely Default.
- 2013 – Rusalki appear as monsters in the action role-playing video game The Incredible Adventures of Van Helsing.
- 2013 – In Christopher Buehlman's The Necromancer's House, the protagonist has a longstanding relationship with a powerful rusalka who starts and assists with a war against Russian sorcerers.
- 2015 – Rusalka is the name of a number of beings in the video game Axiom Verge. In in-game dialogue, one rusalka translates this designation as a "water machine".
- 2017 – In Katherine Arden's debut novel The Bear and the Nightingale the protagonist, Vasya, befriends a rusalka living in a lake.
- 2018 – Don Nigro's play "Rusalka" is about the interrogation of a girl named Lydia regarding the disappearance of her friend who was a Rusalka.
- 2018 – The Mermaid: Lake of the Dead, a horror film about a rusalka who falls in love with a man and places a curse on him.
- 2018 – Rusalki feature in The Surface Breaks, a YA novel by Louise O'Neill and a retelling of Hans Christian Andersen's 1857 story "The Little Mermaid".
- 2018 – In the first half of the song "Rusalka, Rusalka / Wild Rushes" on The Decemberists' album I'll Be Your Girl, the lyrics describe being lured into the water by a rusalka. Additionally, the album box set contains a Rusalka luminary card for the band's game Illimat.
- 2019 - Kate Quinn’s novel The Huntress uses rusalki in various ways throughout the plot.
- 2023 – The song "Rusalochki" by Ukrainian electro-folk band Go_A is inspired by a ritual of accompanying rusalki back to their forest.
- 2024 – Antonín Dvořák's opera Rusalka is playing on the starship in the film Spaceman, starring Adam Sandler. His character (Jakub Procházka) later imagines his wife as a rusalka.
- 2025 – Netflix's show The Witcher features an encounter with a Rusalka for Geralt and his team in the episode "What I Love I Do Not Carry".
- 2026 - In the video game Genshin Impact, in their 7.1 update, introduced 5-star Hydro Catalyst user Vodyanitsa, a water imp and the prima donna of the Korolevskiy Troupe in the Russian inspired Snezhnaya region.

== See also ==
- Slavic water spirits
- Călușari
- Kostroma
- Kelpie
- Naiad
- Nixie
- Ondine
- Selkie
- Sihuanaba
- Siren
- Susulu (mythology)
- Hantu Air

== Sources ==
- Chernykh, P. Ya. (1999). Русалка [Mermaid]. Historical and etymological dictionary of the modern Russian language. Moscow: Русский язык. ISBN 5-200-02686-5.
- Fasmer, M. (1987). Русалка [Mermaid]. Etymological dictionary of the Russian language. Vol. III : Муза — Сят (2nd ed.). Moscow: Progress.
- Levkievskaya, E. E. (2000). Мифы русского народа [Myths of the Russian People]. Moscow: Astrel. ISBN 5-271-00676-X.
