= Themes of C. J. Cherryh's works =

Several themes recur throughout the works of American science fiction and fantasy author C. J. Cherryh.

Cherryh's protagonists often attempt to uphold existing social institutions and norms in the service of the greater good while the antagonists often attempt to exploit, subvert or radically alter the predominant social order for selfish gain. Even when they have conflicting loyalties, her characters do not behave randomly or inexplicably, but for reasons well-rooted in their personality, biology, and culture. A number of Cherryh's novels focus on military and political themes, and on ways in which individuals interact with The Other.

Cherryh frequently incorporates the theme of the outsider finding their place, whether in society, in a family, or in a family-like group. Examples of such outsiders include Tully, Nhi Vanye, Sten Duncan, Bren Cameron, Hallan Meras, Bet Yeager, Sandor Kreja, Fletcher Neihart and Tristen. Characters who have lost their families or have become estranged, often find or create new families in which to belong.

An underlying theme of Cherryh's work is an exploration of gender roles. Her characters reveal both strengths and weaknesses regardless of their gender, although her female protagonists are portrayed as especially capable and determined.

== Gender ==
The sociology of gender is an important theme in Cherryh's writing, but perhaps more subtly so than in that of some other female authors such as Marion Zimmer Bradley or Jean M. Auel. For example, over the course of her first series (the Morgaine cycle), a subordinate warrior, Nhi Vanye, gradually achieves equal status and responsibility with his liege lady Morgaine Angharan. In her most overtly feminist series, the Chanur novels, Cherryh "reverses our own cultural bias" by creating a matriarchal hani society in which men are assumed to be irrational and unstable. In these books she addresses gender equality in two subplots: first, a male human, Tully, struggles to achieve respect; and second, a male hani, Khym Mahn, inspires men's liberation when he becomes the first male starship crew member of his species. Cherryh continues this theme through the last novel in the series, in which a young male hani follows Mahn's example rather than taking his chances fighting other males in the "outback".

Cherryh's characters reveal both strengths and weaknesses regardless of their gender, and in contrast to the traditional depiction of women in science fiction up to the 1970s as "decoration or victims", Cherryh's female protagonists are portrayed as capable and determined. Examples of strong-willed, competent leading females in her work include: Morgaine, Pyanfar Chanur, Bet Yeager (Rimrunners), Ariane Emory I and II (Cyteen), Signy Mallory (Downbelow Station) and others. Cherryh was one of the first female science fiction writers to "open ... a discourse on feminist issues", and "elimina[ted] sexism" by creating futures that had no place for it. She changed the focus of space opera from space ships and interstellar wars to the people involved and how they are affected. Her characters are "complex" and allow women to be heroes. Cherryh created a universe where "women can do anything [and] be anything", and did what English academic, Nancy A. Walker described as "the disobedient, deliberate reconstituting of a genre to accord with women's experience and vision".

== The Outsider and adaptation to the Other ==
Cherryh incorporates another recurring theme in many of her novels: that of the outsider finding their place. The outsider may be different from everyone else for cultural, biological, psychological or even magical reasons. In Cherryh's writing, the outsider's struggle to achieve a sense of belonging forms the main plot or a side-plot. More broadly, how individuals interact with The Other is a central question in her fiction. Sometimes she frames this question in terms of human-human relationships, sometimes in human-alien interactions, and in others among multiple groups of aliens and humans.

Cherryh's most in-depth exploration of this theme may be found in the Foreigner series of novels, in which the main character Bren Cameron plays the role of translator between several alien and human societies. Specifically when handling human-alien encounters with the Other, Cherryh frequently employs the device of a human protagonist required by circumstances to adapt themselves to alien cultures, viewpoints or behavioral norms. In many instances, for them to understand aliens means detaching themselves from human contact, something only someone already living on the outside can do.

Cameron is again a good example here, and others include Kurt Morgan (Brothers of Earth), Sten Duncan (the Faded Sun trilogy), Raen a Sul Meth-Maren, Tully (The Chanur novels), and Thorn (Cuckoo's Egg). Cherryh generates dramatic tension in such cases by presenting the protagonist's success or failure to adapt to alien society as having enormous consequences, often the potential for interstellar war.

In other books, Cherryh requires a group of humans or even an entire human culture to adapt themselves to the realities of alien society. Factions that work in favor of such adaptations are presented sympathetically; those who oppose accommodation and engagement are presented as antagonists. Examples of this device in Cherryh's fiction include Serpent's Reach, Hunter of Worlds, Forty Thousand in Gehenna, and the Gene War books, Hammerfall and Forge of Heaven. The novel Wave Without a Shore and the Merovingen Nights series go even further to describe special cases in which a human sub-culture has actually denied certain alien realities, failed to adapt to these truths, and suffered negative consequences.

== Politics and philosophy ==
Given Cherryh's unflinching support for characters who attempt to constructively engage other societies and cultures, her writing can be characterized as strongly anti-isolationist. The realities she tends to construct in international relations (whether those "nations" are human or alien) are probably most consistent with neorealist thinking, although the prevalence of important non-state actors and low politics in her work suggests at least some postpositivist influence (in the international relations sense, not the philosophical sense).

The alien "Compact" of the Chanur novels, for example, provides a self-contained mini-universe for her to explore such issues, especially the balance of power within a decentralized and anarchic international structure. The formation, maintenance and disruption of the balance of power is a key theme in much of Cherryh's fiction, especially whether it is possible to achieve an equilibrium that enables peaceful relations when the potential for violence is always present. Indeed, the entire history of the central conflict in her Alliance-Union universe can be described as a very long-term process of working to attain such an equilibrium. Other works that explore this theme include the Foreigner novels, the Gene War books, the Fortress series, and Legions of Hell.

More broadly, Cherryh's writing is suffused with politics at all levels, from the highest realms of government to the bickering of crewmates on a starship. In terms of political authority, she tends to portray traditional authority (e.g. King Cefwyn of the Fortress series) and charismatic authority (e.g. Morgaine) in a more positive light than rational-legal authority. Arianne Emory is a notable exception as she is primarily a rational-legal leader, but democratic institutions are relatively uncommon in Cherryh's fiction.

In addition, because Cherryh's protagonists are usually comfortable within established hierarchies of social class, and in fact often act forcefully to preserve such systems, the politics described in her writing is perhaps less egalitarian and more conservative (in the classic sense) than that of many science fiction authors.

Cherryh's heroes and heroines therefore often appear to serve functionalist agendas, in that they attempt to uphold existing social institutions and norms in the service of the greater good. In contrast, Cherryh's villains often personify social conflict theory in that they attempt to exploit, subvert or radically alter the predominant social order for selfish gain. Her novel Downbelow Station offers a clear example of this dichotomy, in which administrator Damon Konstantin represents stability, tradition and the collective good, but his nemesis Jon Lukas attempts a revolutionary power-grab that puts the entire station at risk.

The implied preference for maintaining the political status quo in her work has its limits, however, particularly if the established order has become corrupt or self-serving, or if it is failing to deal effectively with external challenges or internal threats. When the legitimacy of the existing order is compromised in such circumstances, Cherryh's favored political solution is to employ a charismatic leader who arises and either restores the traditional order or establishes new norms of governance. An example of the former type of character is that of Master Saukendar in the world of The Paladin as he restores the integrity of the Imperial dynasty, whereas Signy Mallory takes the latter route when she breaks from existing military order and helps form the new Alliance government in Downbelow Station.

Additionally, it would be a mistake to equate the preferred political solutions Cherryh describes in her novels with various aspects of contemporary American conservatism, such as its isolationist tendencies and especially its religious fundamentalism. Cherryh rarely portrays religious characters sympathetically in her fiction, especially when their dogmas conflict with observed reality or drive them to oppose pragmatic approaches to problem-solving.

When combined with the disdain for superstition frequently expressed by her protagonists and an evident mistrust of magical power (even in many of her works of fantasy), Cherryh's fiction can therefore be said to endorse at least a moderately empiricist philosophy and a rationalist or realist world view. Indeed, her 1981 novel Wave Without a Shore can be read as an explicit rejection of philosophical idealism.

== Military themes ==
A number of Cherryh's novels focus on military protagonists and themes. The story of the Mri Wars, for example, as described in the Faded Sun trilogy, is told primarily from the point of view of Sten Duncan, a special forces soldier in the Alliance military. In addition, the Faded Sun novels highlight the warrior caste of the Mri race, detailing their weapons, military training methods and describing the Mri sense of military honor.

Other aliens of Cherryh's creation also feature special military orders or guilds, such as the Shonunin race's guild of "Hatani" warrior-philosopher-judges in Cuckoo's Egg. The professional Assassin's Guild of the Atevi species from the Foreigner books is also a quasi-military order, charged with gathering military intelligence and managing security in addition to their direct combat responsibilities.

In fact, the Atevi's code of loyalty to their superiors (military and otherwise) is more than simply professional; Cherryh makes it an integral aspect of their biology itself. The Atevi concept of loyalty is so ingrained that the race's language offers 14 different words for "betrayal." In direct contrast, members of the Kif race in the Chanur novels switch allegiances frequently and fluidly, often gaining in rank and power through disloyal behavior, although given the absence of the very concept of loyalty to a Kif, it might be more fair to say a-loyal behavior.

Military honor and fidelity are also central themes in Cherryh's Company Wars stories. The novels Heavy Time and Hellburner concern such issues as interservice rivalry, civilian support of the armed forces, and the bonding that occurs among soldiers in the same military unit. In Downbelow Station, the author further explores the issue of loyalty within the armed forces by portraying combatants from opposing sides of a war who must reconcile the conflicting dictates of their missions with their sense of honor, even to the point of contemplating treason.

Additional Cherryh books that feature soldiers as protagonists include Brothers of Earth (Kurt Morgan), The Paladin (Master Saukendar) and Rimrunners (Bet Yeager). Other Cherryh characters have names derived from those of military firearms: Bren, Sten, and Mondragon, for example, are all names of infantry weapons from the past 120 years.

Even when the lead character is not a soldier, Cherryh often uses warfare as an important plot element in her fiction. Graphic combat scenes occur in many of her novels, such as Forty Thousand in Gehenna, Legions of Hell, the Morgaine cycle, and Serpent's Reach.

In numerous works (such as Finity's End, Explorer and Destroyer), Cherryh delves into relationship dynamics within the chain of command between officers and regular crew. Other Cherryh books consider additional military topics: forced conscription (Merchanter's Luck); biological warfare (the Gene War novels); military hegemony (Hunter of Worlds); and medieval warfare (the Fortress series).

== Works cited ==
- Clark, Stephen R. L. (2007). "C. J. Cherryh: The Ties That Bind". The Yearbook of English Studies. 37 (2, Science Fiction). Modern Humanities Research Association: 197–214. doi:10.1353/yes.2007.0000. JSTOR 20479310. S2CID 141924158.
- Crosby, Janice C. (September 2004). "A Woman With a Mission; or, Why Vanye's Tale is Morgaine's Saga". In Carmien, Edward (ed.). The Cherryh Odyssey. Wildside Press. pp. 150–162. ISBN 9780809510719.
- Eisenhour, Susan J. (1996). A Subversive in Hyperspace: C.J. Cherryh's Feminist Transformation of Space Opera. Eastern Illinois University.
- Stark, Heather (September 2004). "C.J. Cherryh: Is There Really Only One of Her?". In Carmien, Edward (ed.). The Cherryh Odyssey. Wildside Press. pp. 97–111. ISBN 9780809510719.
- Stinson, J. G. (September 2004). "The Human as Other in the Science Fiction Novels of C. J. Cherryh". In Carmien, Edward (ed.). The Cherryh Odyssey. Wildside Press. pp. 133–149. ISBN 9780809510719.
- Walker, Nancy A. (1995). The Disobedient Writer: Women and Narrative Tradition. University of Texas Press. ISBN 9780292790964.
