= Alliance Rising =

2019 novel by C. J. Cherryh and Jane S. Fancher

- First edition cover
- Authors: C. J. Cherryh and Jane S. Fancher
- Cover artist: Micah Epstein
- Language: English
- Series: The Hinder Stars
- Genre: Science fiction
- Publisher: DAW Books
- Publication date: January 8, 2019
- Publication place: United States
- Pages: 352 (hardback)
- Awards: Prometheus Award
- ISBN: 978-0756412715
- OCLC: 1080636895
- Followed by: Alliance Unbound

Alliance Rising is a 2019 science fiction novel by American writers C. J. Cherryh and Jane S. Fancher. It is one of Cherryh's Merchanter novels and is set in the author's Alliance–Union universe. It is the first new novel in this universe to be published in 10 years, the previous being Regenesis in 2009, and the first Merchanter novel in 22 years, the previous being Finity's End in 1997. Alliance Rising is the first book in The Hinder Stars series, and is the first science fiction collaboration between Cherryh and her partner, Fancher. The second book, Alliance Unbound, also credited to Cherryh and Fancher, was published in October 2024. Alliance Rising takes place in the early Alliance–Union timeline, before the events in Downbelow Station (1981) and the founding of the Merchanter's Alliance.

Alliance Rising won the 2020 libertarian science fiction Prometheus Award for best novel.

== Plot summary ==
Alliance Rising takes place on Alpha Station, a space station located at Barnard's Star, about six light-years from Earth. It was the first of nine star-stations constructed by the Earth Company during Earth's outward push into space, and they became known as the Hinder Stars. Further exploration led to the construction of new stations, which later broke away from Earth after the discovery of faster-than-light (FTL) travel. No FTL jump points were found between Earth and Alpha, which restricted Earth Company's control of their stations. Trade between space stations was conducted by family-run merchanter ships. In an attempt to regain control of Alpha Station, Earth Company sent Andrew Cruz to Alpha to manage the building of The Rights of Man, a large FTL ship using stolen plans for Finity's End, a merchant ship based at Pell Station. Earth neglected maintenance of Alpha and focused on the construction of Rights. Alpha stationmaster Ben Abrezio attempted to placate both Earth Company and the merchanters, upon whose trade the station became dependent.

A decade later construction of Rights is complete, but its first test has to be aborted due to system failures. Finity's End arrives at Alpha, fueling speculation that Pell wants to wrestle control of Alpha from Earth Company. But Finity's real purpose is revealed to be the establishment of an alliance between all merchanter ships that would unite them against Earth and stations attempting to control them. Finity's senior captain, JR Neihart, tells the merchanter captains that once jump points between Earth and Alpha are found, Earth Company, which is very likely building their own FTL ships at Sol Station, will come.

Abrezio does not reveal that he has potential jump point coordinates for the Earth–Alpha run. They were discovered by a retired scientist on Alpha after trawling through data collected from slower-than-light ships traveling this route. Abrezio keeps the coordinates a secret because he fears that once Earth arrives, they will upset the balance of power in the region by monopolizing trade between the stations. But when Cruz threatens to take over Alpha, Abrezio sends the coordinates to Earth via the light-speed Stream. He hopes that once Earth arrives, they will see how Alpha has deteriorated, will find that the very expensive Rights cannot jump, and will remove Cruz. However, things on Alpha worsen and Abrezio decides to speed up the delivery of the coordinates to Earth by sending an FTL ship, using the untested jump points. That will cut down the transmission time from six years via the Stream, to less than one. He pleads with Galway's captain Niall Monahan to undertake the dangerous trip. Abrezio assures him that by holding onto the coordinates, he will be the only FTL ship able to return to Alpha, and will be in a position to negotiate a good deal with Earth.

Monahan agrees to undertake the risky run, and under a cloud of secrecy, sets off for Earth. But Cruz had gotten wind of Abrezio's plan and, after hiding on Galway with a handful of his staff, seizes control of the bridge. Ross Monahan, a trainee navigator on Galway, manages to escape with a copy of the jump points, and contacts Neihart and Abrezio and explains that Cruz does not have the coordinates and is dependent on Galway's navigator to get the ship to Earth. It becomes clear that Cruz wants to be the one to arrive at Earth with the coordinates and take the credit.

== Reception ==
A reviewer of Alliance Rising in Publishers Weekly stated that the authors focus on the characters in the story and how they cope with challenges, rather than turning to "pyrotechnics". The reviewer said that the "economics and sociopolitics are as riveting as space battles," and called the book a "welcome addition to the Alliance–Union saga."

Writing in a review in Locus magazine, Liz Bourke described the book as "a measured, compelling work" with characters that are "well-drawn, and finely sketched, with believable motivations." She was, however, critical of the viewpoint characters, saying that very few of them are women. She also felt that the way the characters behaved "seem[ed] reminiscent of the 1970s and 1980s", and that there was not enough cultural diversity. But overall, Bourke found the book "intriguing" and "compelling" enough to want to pursue other books in this universe.

In another review in Locus, Russell Letson said Alliance Rising is a variation of the well-used theme of "colonists and settlers" seeking independence from "a distant, out-of-touch old order". But instead of a tale about "abstract political freedom", here it is "a detailed, textured, and tactile treatment of the material and cultural forces that underlie such struggles." Letson remarked that the book is not very "plotty". Much of the early chapters is devoted to providing a necessary backstory and context for the events that follow, and the rest are largely about the characters and how they interact with each other, express their hopes and fears, and speculate their possible futures. But Letson added that "there is a plot," a plot of the "sneaky sort" – the book closes with "all speculation and hesitation [collapsing] into a storm of overt action".
