= Alliance Unbound =

2024 novel by C. J. Cherryh and Jane S. Fancher

- First edition cover
- Authors: C. J. Cherryh and Jane S. Fancher
- Cover artist: Micah Epstein
- Language: English
- Series: The Hinder Stars
- Genre: Science fiction
- Publisher: DAW Books
- Publication date: October 15, 2024
- Publication place: United States
- Pages: 416 (hardback)
- ISBN: 978-0-7564-1596-9
- Preceded by: Alliance Rising

Alliance Unbound is a 2024 science fiction novel by American writers C. J. Cherryh and Jane S. Fancher. It is the second book in The Hinder Stars series after Alliance Rising (2019), and is set in Cherryh's Alliance–Union universe. The Hinder Stars series is a prequel to the Alliance–Union series and takes place before the events in Downbelow Station (1981) and the founding of the Merchanter's Alliance.

Alliance Unbound was a finalist for the 2025 libertarian science fiction Prometheus Award for Best Novel. The novel was also nominated for the 2025 Dragon Award for Best Science Fiction Novel.

== Plot summary ==
Following on from the events in Alliance Rising at Alpha Station, Ross Monahan from Galway is taken aboard Finity's End as a trainee navigator by senior captain JR Neihart. Finity's End returns to Pell Station to gather signatures for the new Merchanter Alliance. While at Pell, contraband Earth goods are discovered, and it is suggested that the two merchant ships who have not signed the Alliance agreement may be collaborating with Earth Company. In an attempt to locate them, Finity's End jumps to Olympus Station, a mothballed Hinder star station. There they discover that the station is active and under Earth control. In dock are the two missing faster-than-light (FTL) merchant ships, Miriam B and Come Lately. Present is also an unknown sub-light pusher, and an unknown FTL ship with an unprecedented three-vane drive. (Note: FTL ships all have a drive with two vanes, which, when pulsed, generate gravity waves that create a field around the ship that pulls it into hyperspace. Earth Company had attempted to create a more powerful FTL drive with three vanes.) The pusher is revealed to be named Wellington, and the three-vaned ship Shalleen. Both ships were built at Earth, and Shalleen, which had not been tested, had been pushed to Olympus by Wellington.

Finity's End docks at Olympus and JR Neihart leads a delegation to the station to urge the two merchant captains to join the Alliance. He also wants to enquire about the contraband Earth goods found at Pell. He receives a hostile response from the other captains, particularly captain Lee from Wellington. Realizing the futility of further discussions, the delegation leaves to return to their ship. But they are ambushed by Earth Company enforcers from Wellington who are attempting to commandeer Finity's End. Two Finity's End personnel are killed, but the captain and the rest of the team return safely to their ship. Finity's End quickly undocks, disrupting Olympus's stability, and fires upon Wellington, destroying her engines. Miriam B and Come Lately undock and jump out of the system. Shalleen also undocks and attempts to jump using her untested tri-vane system, but it is unclear whether she succeeded. Ross, who has an ability to "hear" and "feel" stars, theorizes that while Shalleen has disappeared, she has not left the system. Data collected on Shalleen's movements suggest that when the ship entered hyperspace, her systems immediately overloaded and she fell back into realspace, but not entirely as physical matter.

== Reception ==
Fantasy and science fiction writer Jo Walton praised Alliance Unbound as a "great" sequel to Alliance Rising, adding that readers familiar with Cherry's Alliance–Union universe will find something in this book "that will make you choke on your tea". Walton also praised the Alliance–Union series, calling it "one of the best series ever, one ... that has shaped what stories of future history and space can be". She opined that it deserves a Hugo Award for Best Series. In a review of the novel at nerds of a feather, Joe Sherry wrote that readers who have appreciated Cherryh's books, and especially the "power politics" of Cyteen (1988), will like Alliance Unbound. Sherry enjoyed the book's "minutiae of interstellar politics", but found that the rich and powerful Neihart family on Finity's End a little "heavy handed".

Writing on the Prometheus Award website, Libertarian Futurist Society, Michael Grossberg stated that Alliance Unbound continues the early history of the Alliance–Union future-history saga. He said the novel has likeable characters and a "suspenseful" plot that "sheds light on how the ethics and benefits of voluntary cooperation and free thought advance merchanter culture, while revealing the authoritarian and dysfunctional tendencies within bureaucracies, military commands and other coercive systems." Also writing for the Libertarian Futurist Society, William H. Stoddard explained that it is "scarcity" that dictates the events in Alliance Unbound and its predecessor. The space stations are all dependent on trade between the stations and the three planets in this universe, namely Pell’s World, Cyteen and Earth. Stoddard stated that this is a theme that has often been explored in science fiction, for example Robert Heinlein's Citizen of the Galaxy and Vernor Vinge's A Deepness in the Sky.
