= The Merchanter novels =

Book series by C. J. Cherryh

The Merchanter novels are several loosely connected novels by science fiction and fantasy author C. J. Cherryh set in her Alliance-Union universe. These science fiction novels explore her merchanter subculture: the extended families that own and operate the ships that supply goods, transportation, news and trade to the various worlds and space stations in the human Earth, Alliance and Union space. The novels are related by a common setting and theme – a misfit (made so by circumstance) who finds their proper home – rather than plot and character; none of the books is a direct sequel of another in the conventional sense.

Cherryh's merchanter-oriented works include:

- Merchanter's Luck (DAW Books, 1982)
- Rimrunners (Warner Books, 1989)
- Tripoint (Warner, 1994)
- Finity's End (Warner, 1997)
- Alliance Rising (DAW, 2019) – credited to C. J. Cherryh and Jane S. Fancher

Rimrunners differs from the other three novels in that the story does not take place aboard a merchanter ship and does not feature merchanter families.

All four books were nominated for the Locus Award for Best Science Fiction Novel in their respective years of eligibility, but only Rimrunners and Finity's End were shortlisted. Cherryh's Hugo Award-winning novel Downbelow Station (DAW, 1981), is also closely related to these works, as it covers the conclusion of the Company Wars between the Earth Company Fleet and Union, and the formation of the Merchanter's Alliance itself.

The books are works of space opera, and some also have aspects of military science fiction, particularly Rimrunners.

== Publication information ==
- Cherryh, C. J.; Fancher, Jane S. Alliance Rising, DAW Books, 2019.
- Cherryh, C. J. Downbelow Station, DAW Books, 1981.
- Cherryh, C. J. Finity's End, Warner Aspect, 1997.
- Cherryh, C. J. Merchanter's Luck, DAW Books, 1982.
- Cherryh, C. J. Rimrunners, Warner Books, 1989.
- Cherryh, C. J. Tripoint, Warner Aspect, 1994.
