= Azi (clone) =

Fictional type of human clones

Azi are a fictional type of human clones invented by science fiction and fantasy author C. J. Cherryh. They appear in various books in her Alliance-Union universe. "Azi" is an acronym for "artificial zygote insemination". The subject is treated at length in Cherryh's 1989 novel Cyteen and its 2009 sequel, Regenesis.

The azi are first developed by Union just prior to the "Company War" in the early twenty-fourth century. Although derived from human gene sequences, they are both genetically engineered and psychologically conditioned for specific occupations, such as soldiers or farmers. They are created to supplement the low human reproductive rate and bring a given settlement to self-sufficiency and economic viability.

Because of these modifications, azi are seen as an abomination by many on Earth, and this revulsion is an exacerbating factor in the start of the war between the Earth Company and Union. During the Company War, Union produces large numbers of azi for its military and to augment its civilian population and thus stimulate economic growth. In large measure, the azi are therefore responsible for Union forces winning a war of attrition against the Earth Company Fleet led by Conrad Mazian.

To some degree, the azi are also controversial in Union itself. As mentioned in Cherryh's books Cyteen and Regenesis, there is an abolitionist party which seeks to emancipate what it considers to be slaves, but it has little political power.

Azi are introduced to "tape" or subliminal learning at birth, which has a profound effect on their psychological development. They are less adept at handling unusual or new situations compared to normal humans, but they are able to concentrate better. Each azi has a Supervisor, to whom he or she looks to for orders and guidance. Azi are categorized using letters from a to z, with the very brightest (on the "Rezner scale") being classed as Alphas. Azi under T class cannot read. Azi can eventually apply to become full Union citizens, and in frontier stations often become the first generation of an otherwise regular human population.

The Reseune research facility on Cyteen, the main Union planet, is central to all azi development. It has a monopoly on advanced tape design and is the legal protector of all azi in Union. The process of selecting specific azi "psych-sets" is referred to in Cyteen's sequel, Regenesis, as integrations, or designing a group of azi to complement a group of "born-man" mind sets to balance them, and thus produce a more stable society.

Now [Ari] was working directly with the ethics that drove [Novgorod], examining the ethics set into the azi who had been the foundational citizens. Did she intend to tweak that mix? She could. She could subtly, by sending in other azi into key positions, shift the whole Cyteen electorate. She could set others at work at Fargone, where Ollie ruled. She knew Ollie's ethical structure. She had a copy of Ollie's personal manual, down to the day he left. She could skim it at high speed, and recognize ordinary structures from special ones. She could design azi to fit around Ollie, no question, the foundations of something special, around one that she'd loved, when she was little. She could make all Fargone Station into Ollie's image.

Azi characters are featured in the following Cherryh books:

- Serpent's Reach (1980)
- Downbelow Station (1981)
- Port Eternity (1982)
- Merchanter's Luck (1982)
- Forty Thousand in Gehenna (1983)
- Cyteen (1988)
- Regenesis (2009)

== Reception ==
Gregory Pence in his 1998 book compared Cherryh's Cyteen trilogy to Ridley Scott's Blade Runner, calling them "two famous, fictional treatment" of cloning. He noted that one of the focal themes of Cyteen is the moral injustice of treating human clones as "things or slaves".

== Notes ==
The production of azi is similar to the normal policy of human reproduction used in Aldous Huxley's classic novel Brave New World, complete with tiered ranks based upon overall intelligence and education via "tape".

== Sources ==
- Bernardo, Susan (2004). "Of Emorys and Warricks: Self-Creation in Cyteen". In Carmien, Edward (ed.). The Cherryh Odyssey. Borgo Press. pp. 164–176. ISBN 0-8095-1071-5.
- Clark, Stephen R. L. (2007). "C. J. Cherryh: The Ties That Bind". The Yearbook of English Studies. 37 (2): 197–214. JSTOR 20479310.
- Heidkamp, Bernie (November 1996). "Responses to the Alien Mother in Post-Maternal Cultures: C.J. Cherryh and Orson Scott Card". Science Fiction Studies. 23 (3): 339–354. JSTOR 4240539.
- Romey, Elizabeth (2004). "Dr. Ariane Emory, Sr.: Psychopath—or Savior?". In Carmien, Edward (ed.). The Cherryh Odyssey. Borgo Press. pp. 177–194. ISBN 0-8095-1071-5.
- Stinson, J. G. (2004). "The Human as Other in the Science Fiction Novels of C. J. Cherryh". In Carmien, Edward (ed.). The Cherryh Odyssey. Borgo Press. pp. 133–149. ISBN 0-8095-1071-5.
- Turner, Lynn (September 2011). "Animal Transference: A 'Mole-like Progression' in C.J. Cherryh". Mosaic: An Interdisciplinary Critical Journal. 44 (3): 163–175. JSTOR 44029590.
