= Hammerfall (disambiguation) =

HammerFall is a Swedish power metal band.

Hammerfall or HammerFall or variant may also refer to:

- Hammarfall, also spelled Hammerfall, a small village in Sørfold Municipality in Nordland county, Norway
- Hammerfall (novel), a novel in C. J. Cherryh's fictional Gene Wars universe
- Hammerfall, a fictional city in the Warcraft series
- 'Hammer Fall', a fictional event in the 1977 Niven-Pournelle apocalyptic science-fiction novel Lucifer's Hammer

== See also ==
- Hammerfell, a fictional province in The Elder Scrolls video games
- Hammer (disambiguation)
