= Tripoint (novel) =

1995 novel by C. J. Cherryh

- US paperback edition, 1995
- Author: C. J. Cherryh
- Cover artist: Stephen Youll
- Language: English
- Genre: Science fiction
- Publisher: Warner Books
- Publication date: September 1994
- Publication place: United States
- Media type: Print (hardback & paperback)
- Pages: 377 (hardback)
- ISBN: 0-446-51780-1
- OCLC: 29223777
- Dewey Decimal: 813/.54 20
- LC Class: PS3553.H358 T75 1994

Tripoint is a science fiction novel by the United States science fiction and fantasy author C. J. Cherryh, first published by Warner Books in September 1994. It is one of Cherryh's Merchanter novels and is set in the author's Alliance-Union universe.

== Plot summary ==
Twenty years in the past, merchanter ships Sprite and Corinthian were docked at Mariner Station. What started out as a friendly sleepover between the inexperienced Marie Hawkins of Sprite and Austin Bowe of Corinthian turned into rape, with Marie becoming pregnant. She elected to raise the child, Thomas Bowe-Hawkins, on Sprite, but was consumed with rage. Her brother was the senior captain of Sprite. Tom grew up with an ambivalent mother and was never fully accepted by his family. When Austin later became senior captain of Corinthian, Marie started tracking Corinthian's movements in order to expose what she suspected was smuggling.

When the two ships cross paths again, this time at Viking, Marie initiates her long-planned revenge. She and Tom scour the docks for information about Corinthian's cargo, but Tom is caught snooping and is imprisoned aboard Corinthian, forcing the ship to depart prematurely for Pell Station via Tripoint. At Marie's insistence, Sprite pursues. Aboard Corinthian, Tom meets Austin, his domineering father, and Capella, second chief navigator and night-walker.

When Corinthian docks at Pell Station, Tom's younger half-brother, Christian Bowe-Perrault, tries to solve the problem by shipping him off to Sol Station, but Tom escapes and hides on the docks. Christian and Capella search frantically for him, unaware that Sabrina Perrault-Cadiz, Christian's cousin, has already found and befriended him. When Capella contacts old acquaintances for assistance, it attracts the unwanted attention of a dissident faction within the outlawed Mazianni Fleet. Capella is an ex-Fleet navigator with knowledge of Fleet routes and drop-points, which the dissidents want.

When Corinthian prepares to depart for Tripoint, Tom returns voluntarily to the ship and is no longer treated as a prisoner. He learns the ship's secret: they are illegally trading with the renegade Fleet. Austin justifies this by maintaining that supplying the Fleet means it will not have to raid merchanter ships.

Sprite arrives at Pell Station shortly after Corinthian's departure and takes off again in pursuit. During Corinthian's jump to Tripoint, Capella is aware of Sprite and a Mazianni spotter following, and performs a premature system-drop near an abandoned freighter, causing the other ships to overshoot. Corinthian immediately starts frantically offloading to the freighter, a Fleet drop-point. As the spotter and Sprite approach, Tom and Christian activate the freighter's weapons and destroy the spotter.

Tom tells his mother he is staying with Corinthian because he is more at home on his father's ship than his mother's. Marie, having taken the captaincy of Sprite from her weak brother, does not expose Corinthian's illegal trade because of Tom and because Corinthian outguns Sprite. Austin realizes too many people know about his connection with the Fleet and decides to leave Alliance-Union space for good. As amends for the past, Austin offers Marie the access codes to the hulk at Tripoint and the opportunity to take over Corinthian's profitable trade, but she declines and the ships part company.

During Corinthian's next jump, Capella tells Tom about a new drop-point she discovered that leads to a habitable planet with forests. The Mazianni are building a new secret colony there and Corinthian is now part of that future.

== Main characters ==
=== Merchanter ship Sprite ===
- Thomas Bowe-Hawkins – junior computer technician
- Marie Hawkins – cargo chief, Thomas' mother
- Mischa Hawkins – captain, Marie's brother

=== Merchanter ship Corinthian ===
- Christian Bowe-Perrault – officer, Thomas' half-brother
- Austin Bowe – captain, Thomas and Christian's father
- Beatrice Perrault – pilot, Christian's mother
- Sabrina Perrault-Cadiz – officer, Christian's cousin
- Capella – second chief navigator on loan to Corinthian from the Fleet
