= The Chanur novels =

Science fiction novel series by C. J. Cherryh

- The Chanur Saga omnibus
- The Pride of Chanur; Chanur's Venture; The Kif Strike Back; Chanur's Homecoming; Chanur's Legacy
- Author: C. J. Cherryh
- Cover artist: Michael Whelan
- Country: United States
- Genre: Science fiction
- Publisher: DAW Books
- Published: 1982–1992

The Chanur novels are a series of five science fiction novels, forming three separate stories, written by American author C. J. Cherryh and published by DAW Books between 1982 and 1992. The first novel in the series is The Pride of Chanur (1982), which was nominated for both the Hugo and Locus Awards in 1983. The Pride of Chanur, originally a stand-alone story, was followed by the Chanur's Venture trilogy (also referred to as "Chanur's Revenge"), Chanur's Venture (1984), which was shortlisted for a Locus Award in 1985; The Kif Strike Back (1985) and Chanur's Homecoming (1986). These were followed by a later sequel, Chanur's Legacy (1992). The five novels were also published in two omnibus editions: the first three in The Chanur Saga in 2000 and the next two in Chanur's Endgame in 2007.

An abridged version of The Pride of Chanur was published in the Science Fiction Digest in 1983.

== The Compact ==
The series is set in the same Alliance-Union universe of Downbelow Station, but in a region of space in the opposite direction from Earth as the Alliance and Union. It is occupied by a number of spacefaring civilizations bound by a set of trade treaties into a so-called Compact. The Compact is not a political organization, and has no government; it deals only with open trade, leaving the component civilizations to resolve conflicts between themselves.

Human space borders kif and knnn territory, the most aggressive and enigmatic species of the Compact respectively. First contact ensues when an ambitious kif hakkikt (prince) captures a human exploration ship. The last surviving crew member, Tully, escapes while the kif ship is docked at a station and winds up on The Pride of Chanur, a hani merchant vessel commanded by Pyanfar Chanur. This triggers the events of the first novel in the series and its three-part sequel.

== Species of the Compact ==
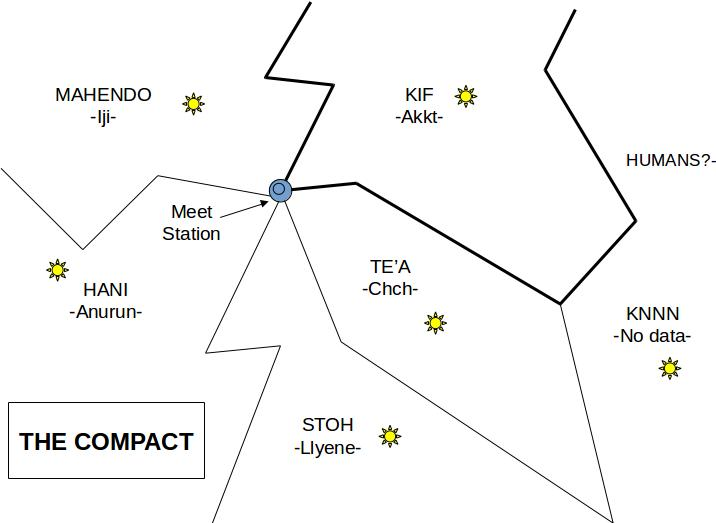
Map of The Compact

=== Oxygen-breathers ===
==== Hani ====
Homeworld: Anuurn

Hani are a feline-like species, maned, bearded, usually of red or tawny fur. Females are smaller than humans, males much larger (for much the same reason as Earth lions). They were discovered by the mahendo'sat and helped into space; most of their technology is therefore derived from mahen.

They live in autonomous clans, each consisting of related females, children, and a single male, the clan lord. A male takes over a clan by defeating the previous lord in personal combat. Most males are not that lucky. Male offspring are thrown out of their clan when they become strong enough to pose a threat to the lord. They live in exile among others like themselves, honing their fighting skills and waiting for the opportunity to challenge for a clan. For this reason and because males are stereotyped as being emotionally unstable, only females go into space (until Pyanfar Chanur changes the rules). Females do all the work on clan lands and in space ventures, although Cherryh does describe some able and intelligent males who become involved in the world around them.

Clans are united into amphictionies for control of scarce resources; the biggest one is their homeworld itself, governed by a mahen-inspired council of clans called the han. Hani politics are tradition-bound, based on such concepts as allegiance, honor, blood feud and parole.

One of the hani languages became the basis for the Compact's pidgin, because it was grammatically and phonetically easy for other species (but not as easy for humans).

==== Mahendo'sat ====
Homeworld: Iji

Mahendo'sat (singular mahe) are black or brown primate-like creatures, human-size or larger. They are very curious, innovative and politically oriented. The Mahendo'sat political system is based on the concept of Personage, a charismatic figure with a lot of social credit; a Personage's power is determined by the number of its followers, but a supporter can either weaken or strengthen its Personage, depending on whether its actions in its Personage's name prove to be beneficial or not. To an outsider, this can (and frequently does) look like a Personage's mahen agents are promoting mutually contradictory policies at the same time. Mahendo'sat are idiosyncratically bad at learning other species' languages—many of them can not even master the pidgin used by Compact spacers—although they are quite eloquent in their own numerous languages. Mahendo'sat are the "glue" of the Compact, always trying to maintain the balance of power so peace can be kept and no species dominates. They are in constant search of new powers, recently including humans.

==== Stsho ====
Homeworld: Llyene

Stsho are slight, slender, fragile, crested bird-like white herbivores (even their eyes are pearly white), xenophobic and non-aggressive. They permit no other oxygen-breathing species in their territory and keep the location of their home world a secret. Stsho rely on wealth, trade, and alliances to maintain their position within the Compact. They hire other species for protection and maintaining order on their space stations, usually the mahendo'sat. They prefer delicate pleasures and pastel colors, their speech is exceedingly ceremonial and politically correct; their identities are prone to change ("Phase") under great stress, which has many legal implications. They have three genders, gtst, gtste and gtsto, which can change with Phasing. Only the gtst (indeterminate sex) deal with other species. There is a fourth state, gtsta, in which the individual is addressed as a holiness. This is a sexless state usually achieved by an aged, honorable Stsho. A Stsho who is in the process of Phasing from one state to another is gtstisi.

==== Kif ====
Homeworld: Akkht.

Kif are bare-skinned, wrinkled, ash-grey, long-snouted rat-like bipedal carnivores. They are the tallest species in the Compact, slender, fast and deadly. They are strictly predators, unable to eat anything but live prey; they have two sets of teeth (outer for biting and inner for pulping—their throats are unfit for swallowing solid food) and retractable claws.

Their social and political [dis]organization revolves about a personal quality called sfik, which combines face, authority, and ferociousness. Sfik is gained through victory in combat, or possession of something of value, or just the respect of others: followers with their own strong sfik strengthen the sfik of their leader. A kif that loses sfik is likely to have its followers either defect or kill it. As a result, the kif are prone to change sides at the first sign of weakness. They seem to have no other moral values; they are pirates and cannibals, and are generally deemed troublesome and dangerous by the other species.

Occasionally, a strong leader gains enough sfik to achieve the status of hakkikt. These individuals are viewed by the mahendo'sat as serious destabilizing factors. During the time of the Chanur cycle, several hakkiktun seek to become the mekt-hakkikt, the leader of all the kif, a status no kif has ever attained, a possibility that greatly disturbs other species, especially the mahendo'sat.

Kif are very linguistically adept and adaptable. They are also color blind and the colors of their clothes and habitats are generally shades of black and grey. They use dot codes instead of color codes for their hardware. Unlike other Compact oxygen-breathers, they are capable of remaining awake and physically active during the "no-time" of "Jump" – a fact which (like most other things about themselves) they prefer to keep secret.

=== Methane-breathers ===
==== Tc'a and Chi ====
Tc'a are large methane-breathing five-eyed yellow snakelike beings, and the chi are yellow arthropod-like creatures. The two species are related in a way none of the oxygen breathers understand, but are (presumably) symbiotic. They are very technologically advanced and powerful, although understanding them is tricky at best, since their brains are multi-part and their speech decodes as complex matrices of intertwined meanings. They run the methane side of most space stations.

==== Knnn ====
Knnn, the third methane-breathing species, multi-legged tangles of wiry black hair, are the most technologically advanced in the Compact. Unlike other known species, they can maneuver in hyperspace and carry other ships with them. Only tc'a can communicate with them (or claim they can); the knnn are incomprehensible and therefore deemed dangerous by the other species, not to be provoked. They trade by taking whatever they want and leaving whatever they deem sufficient as payment behind; it is an improvement over their prior habit of just taking trader ships apart.

== Technology of the Compact ==
There are three main kinds of space ships in Compact's employ: surface-to-orbit shuttles, miners, and jump ships. The first and the second use only reaction engines for propulsion; shuttles can land on planets while miners and jump ships need space stations to dock. Only the jump ships can cross interstellar distances by using a jump drive. They are also the fastest in-system transports because they can move at sub-light speeds without entering a jump. Most of these are traders and freighters; some are heavily armed hunter-ships.

Compact jump ships do not enter hyperspace proper; they aim at a star and "glide" along the so-called interface between space and hyperspace until the mass at the other end of the jump goal makes them drop out. They exit at light speed and must dump velocity with help of the same jump engine; a ship failing to do so is doomed, and usually a high hazard. There is a limit on maximum jump distance, depending on the ship's drive power and mass; a ship overstretching a jump may "fade", never exiting it. A jump takes several weeks of objective time. Subjectively it can take hours or even several days; this tends to exhaust the body, and the crews need to take rest between jumps. Hani and mahendo'sat stay marginally conscious during jump, but unable to act; usually, they dream. Stsho must drug themselves unconscious to survive jump. Humans can survive it undrugged, but it is a terrible experience to them. No one knows what the other species feel during it, though it is hinted that kif maintain more of their faculties than hani during jump. Jumps can be strung together, but at a commensurate increase in crew discomfort.

Ships and space stations communicate by radio, which poses time-lag difficulties. To alleviate them somewhat, heavily trafficked systems usually keep buoys near the jump exit points that serve incoming ships with system-wide scan and traffic information, and also mail.

The space stations are universally built as huge doughnuts, the spin maintaining artificial gravity provided by centrifugal force; the Compact has no gravitational-control technology. The spin poses a difficulty when docking, as the ship must precisely coincide with the rotating station wheel. When docked, two sets of grapples, its own and the station's, hold it in place and in mutual clinch: a ship can undock forcibly, but that is bound to damage the station and is subject to substantial fines. Tankers and miners dock at the central hub for the transfer of materials. Dockside transport is mostly electric carts and trucks of all sizes, but many move around on the docks on foot. If a ship were to power up its jump engine while docked, the energy released would blow the whole compound to pieces.

Different species build ships in different fashions; the methane-breather ships seem haphazardly constructed to the oxygen breathers. Hani ships such as The Pride of Chanur are based on mahendo'sat technology. The dock grapples are at the prow of the ship. Behind it is the habitat area with a rotating carousel which provides "gravity" during inertial flight and in jump; the bridge, galley and living quarters – including crew and passenger quarters – are all located in that ring. Then come the pressurized and "cold" holds for cargo canisters, loading machinery and a separate cargo access hatch; then the jump drive assembly with three vanes constructed of modular panels and mounted on support columns, with wire struts; these form the "hyperspace bubble" needed to cross the interface. At the rear of the ship is the main engine, used for ballistic flight. Hunter ships have less cargo space and more weaponry and crew accommodation, and often have detachable holds; even a freighter can "blow its holds" when necessary to lighten the ship to allow for more speed. This is only done in extremis, as the entire purpose of a freighter is to trade in goods and make a profit.

Weapons include lasers, automatic cannons, and missile batteries for the ship; personal armaments include small beam weapons, pistols, and "AP guns", which fire explosive shells, not unlike a small grenade launcher. Knives are also mentioned. Hani and kif, as predators, also have sharp retractile claws and sharp teeth. The mahendo'sat have tough, non-retractable claws, which are often used for utilitarian purposes, but using these in a fight is seen as a sign of madness in their culture.

== Plots and characters ==
=== The Pride of Chanur ===
The balance of power and economic stability of the Compact are threatened when an Outsider, a human named Tully, escapes from his kif captors at Meetpoint Station and seeks refuge on a hani merchant ship, The Pride of Chanur, captained by Pyanfar Chanur. Pyanfar's refusal to surrender Tully to the kif makes an enemy of their ambitious leader, Akukkakk. The kif had captured Tully's ship and tried to force the four surviving humans to divulge all they knew about their previously unknown species, but the humans resisted. Tully was the only survivor. Aboard The Pride, Tully persuades an initially reluctant Pyanfar to accept him as a member of her otherwise all-female crew. The kif chase The Pride back to the hani homeworld, but the unpredictable and powerful knnn drive the kif away. The knnn also transport a human ship they found, the Ulysses, into hani space, and Tully is reunited with his species.

Main characters

- Pyanfar Chanur (hani): captain of The Pride of Chanur
- Tully (human): fugitive from the kif and crewmember of The Pride of Chanur
- Ana Ismehanan-min a.k.a. Goldtooth (mahendo'sat): captain of Mahijiru
- Akukkakk (kif): hakkikt and captain of Hinukku

=== Chanur's Venture / The Kif Strike Back / Chanur's Homecoming ===
Two years after the events of The Pride of Chanur, Pyanfar Chanur returns to Meetpoint Station with The Pride, where Goldtooth presents the surprised hani captain with Tully, returned from Earth. A fleet of human ships is on the way, though Tully does not make it clear whether they are coming to establish trade relations with the Compact or attack the kif. This threatens to break the uneasy balance of power within the Compact. At the same time, two kif, Akkhtimakt and Sikkukkut, are engaged in a power struggle, both trying to become the mekt-hakkikt and finally unite the kif, a prospect that inspires dread among most of the rest of the species in the Compact. Sikkukkut persuades a reluctant Pyanfar into becoming his ally, which raises the suspicions of an already hostile agent of the planet-oriented, conservative hani government. The kif conflict spills over into hani space, threatening the hani homeworld, but Goldtooth and the human fleet arrive and the two hakkikts are defeated. A small delegation of Compact ships return with the human ships to human space to investigate trade. Pyanfar offers Tully the opportunity to return with the human ships, but he elects to remain on The Pride as a crew member.

Main characters

- Pyanfar Chanur (hani): captain of The Pride of Chanur
- Khym Mahn (hani): Pyanfar's husband and crewmember of The Pride of Chanur
- Tully (human): crewmember of The Pride of Chanur
- Ana Ismehanan-min a.k.a. Goldtooth (mahendo'sat): captain of Mahijiru
- Keia Nomesteturjai a.k.a. Jik (mahendo'sat): captain of Aja Jin
- Akkhtimakt (kif): hakkikt and captain of Kahakt
- Sikkukkut an Nikktukktin (kif): hakkikt and captain of Harukk
- Stle-stles-stlen (stsho): stationmaster of Meetpoint Station

=== Chanur's Legacy ===
The Compact is at peace, thanks to a treaty brokered by Pyanfar Chanur, elevating her to a newly created position as President of Compact Space to go with her status as mekt-hakkikt of the kif. Eight years later, Hilfy Chanur, Pyanfar's niece, former crew member of The Pride of Chanur and captain of her own ship, Chanur's Legacy, arrives at Meetpoint Station. There No'shto-shti-stlen, the stsho stationmaster, offers her a million-credit contract to deliver a precious oji (cultural artifact) to Atli-lyen-tlas, the stsho ambassador at Urtur Station. Hilfy, wanting to not offend the powerful stationmaster and tempted by the enormous payment, reluctantly accepts the contract and takes aboard the oji and its stsho guardian. Legacy's ordeal begins when they reach Urtur, only to find Atli-lyen-tlas has fled. A mahen faction that many mahendo'sat believe to have "the Momentum" (a mystical force) wants the oji and is hunting for the stsho ambassador. Vikktakkht, a kif hakkikt, rescues Atli-lyen-tlas and "shelters" gtst in kif space, persuading Hilfy to come and fetch gtst. Hilfy rescues Atli-lyen-tlas, but discovers that gtst, due to the stress of gtst's ordeal and old age, has become gtsta, or neuter, and cannot accept the oji, which turns out to constitute a marriage proposal from No'shto-shti-stlen. With the help of Vikktakkht, Hilfy returns to Meetpoint, now under the control of the mahen faction, and frees No'shto-shti-stlen, presenting gtst with Atli-lyen-tlas and the oji, thus completing a complex politically oriented marriage contract. The mahendo'sat are ousted from Meetpoint and control is returned to the stsho.

Main characters

- Hilfy Chanur (hani): Pyanfar Chanur's niece and captain of Chanur's Legacy
- Hallan Meras (hani): abandoned young male taken on by Chanur's Legacy
- Tahaisimandi Ana-kehnandian a.k.a. Haisi (mahendo'sat): pilot of Ha'domaren
- No'shto-shti-stlen (stsho): stationmaster of Meetpoint Station
- Tlisi-tlas-tin (stsho): stsho aide and guardian of the oji aboard Chanur's Legacy
- Atli-lyen-tlas (stsho): stsho ambassador to Urtur and recipient of the oji
- Vikktakkht an Nikkatu (kif): hakkikt and captain of Tiraskhi

== Publication history ==
The first book, The Pride of Chanur, was printed as a book club edition hardcover in December 1981 for the Science Fiction Book Club, as the selection for January 1982. The original paperback edition was published in January 1982.

1. The Pride of Chanur (DAW Books, 1982; Methuen, 1983; Phantasia Press, 1987)
2. Chanur's Venture (DAW Books, 1984; Phantasia Press, 1984; Methuen, 1986)
3. The Kif Strike Back (DAW Books, 1985; Phantasia Press, 1985; Methuen, 1987)
4. Chanur's Homecoming (DAW Books, 1986; Phantasia Press, 1986; Methuen, 1988)
5. Chanur's Legacy (DAW Books, 1992)

=== Omnibus editions ===
- The Chanur Saga (DAW Books, 2000). Pride of Chanur, Chanur's Venture, and The Kif Strike Back
- Chanur's Endgame (DAW Books, 2007). Chanur's Homecoming and Chanur's Legacy
