= Forty Thousand in Gehenna =

1983 science fiction novel by C. J. Cherryh

- First edition
- Author: C. J. Cherryh
- Cover artist: Phil Parks
- Language: English
- Genre: Science fiction
- Published: October 1983 (Phantasia Press)
- Publication place: United States
- Pages: 316
- ISBN: 0-932096-26-3
- OCLC: 10025923

Forty Thousand in Gehenna, alternately 40,000 in Gehenna, is a 1983 science fiction novel by American writer C. J. Cherryh. It is set in her Alliance-Union universe between 2354 and 2658, and is one of the few works in that universe to portray the Union side; other exceptions include Cyteen (1988) and Regenesis (2009).

The book was first published in a limited hardcover edition in 1983 by Phantasia Press, followed by a mainstream paperback release in 1984 by DAW Books. It was nominated for the Locus Award for Best Science Fiction Novel in 1984. Forty Thousand in Gehenna was reprinted in 2008 along with Cherryh's novel Merchanter's Luck (1982) in an omnibus volume entitled Alliance Space.

== Plot summary ==
A group of 42,363 Union humans and azi are dispatched to set up a base on a very rare habitable planet named Gehenna II in the Zeta Reticuli system. Unknown to the settlers, their mission is designed to fail; they are deliberately abandoned in order to create an unmanageable population for the rival Alliance which is expected to eventually take possession of the system.

The native calibans are first presented as annoying lizard-like creatures constantly moving earth to make incomprehensible patterns. The humans at first attempt to keep them outside a perimeter or to drive them away. In time, larger and larger calibans are seen, with differences in color, size, and a social structure (gray calibans are subservient to the larger brown calibans). It becomes clear that the creatures are capable of communication, at least at the level of symbology, and of developing empathic or possibly telepathic links to humans. Eventually a symbiosis develops, with some of the calibans pairing off with humans.

Over a period of several generations and cut off from resupply, the colonists lapse into a primitive lifestyle. By necessity, the azi are allowed to raise families. The non-azi humans are in the minority from the beginning and over time, intermarry with the majority. An Alliance mission first seeks to intervene, then withdraws from direct contact, content to watch as two quasi-feudal, fundamentally opposed societies develop, while a third, smaller group called the "Weirds" becomes much more closely associated with the calibans, living with them rather than the other humans and becoming less comprehensible in the process.

The novel follows several generations of descendants of one azi who establish different lines and rise to become the leaders of two rival cultures. Historical moments depict the decline of the colony, the establishment of human-caliban relations, cultural development, and the planetary environment. Finally, the two cultures, one "masculine"-aggressive, the other more "feminine"-receptive, fight for dominance. A Union delegation arrives at the end, to be given short shrift by Elai, the female ruler who has emerged victorious.

== Characters ==
The years refer to Gehenna years since the founding of the original colony.

Union military personnel

- Colonel James A. Conn (d.3) – governor
- Captain Ada P. Beaumont (d.0) – lieutenant governor

Union civilian personnel

- Marco X. Gutierrez (d.32) – biologist

Non-citizen personnel

- Jin 458-9998 (d.58) – "A" class azi
- Pia 86-687 (d.46) – "A" class azi

Cloudside settlement

- Elai (b.178, d.241) – ruler of the Cloud River towers

Styxside settlement

- Jin 12 (b.170, d.205) – ruler of the Styx River towers

Alliance personnel

- Dr. Elizabeth McGee (MaGee) (active 188–205+) – scientist studying the Cloudside settlement
- Dr. R. Genley (active 188–205, d.205) – scientist studying the Styxside settlement

== Connection to Cyteen ==
The novel is set very firmly in the Alliance-Union universe, through the Union origin of the colony and the role of Alliance observers in the later stages. The failure of the colony is meant to cause headaches for the Alliance when Union cedes the region of space that includes Gehenna to its rival's sphere of influence. In Cherryh's novel Cyteen, the rediscovery of the Gehenna colony causes a major political scandal in Union; it is also revealed that specific traits were introduced into the genesets of the azi, without the knowledge of the Union military, in order to help them survive.

== Reception ==
Dave Langford reviewed Forty Thousand in Gehenna for White Dwarf #75, and stated that "You feel there's been too much background information and not enough about what's happening now. An interesting read, but little is lost by skimming the first half."

== Reviews ==
- Review by Faren Miller (1983) in Locus, #271 August 1983
- Review by Tom Easton (1983) in Analog Science Fiction/Science Fact, October 1983
- Review by Diane K. Bauerle (1984) in Fantasy Review, November 1984
- Review by Don D'Ammassa (1985) in Science Fiction Chronicle, #64 January 1985
- Review [French] by Richard D. Nolane (1986) in Fiction, #371
- Review by Martyn Taylor (1986) in Paperback Inferno, #59
- Review by Hannu Hiilos (1986) in Foundation, #37 Autumn 1986
