= Cyteen =

1988 science fiction novel by C. J. Cherryh

- First edition hardcover
- Author: C. J. Cherryh
- Cover artist: Don Maitz
- Language: English
- Genre: Science fiction
- Publisher: Warner Books
- Publication date: May 1988
- Publication place: United States
- Pages: 680 (Hardback)
- Awards: Hugo Award for Best Novel (1989); Locus Award for Best Science Fiction Novel (1989)
- ISBN: 0-446-51428-4
- OCLC: 16900887
- Dewey Decimal: 813.54 19
- LC Class: PS3553.H358 C98 1988
- Preceded by: –
- Followed by: Regenesis

Cyteen (1988) is a science fiction novel by American writer C. J. Cherryh, set in her Alliance-Union universe. In the story, the murder of a major Union politician and scientist has deep, long-lasting repercussions. It won the Hugo Award for Best Novel in 1989.

The sequel, Regenesis, was published by DAW Books in January 2009.

== Plot background ==
Founded in 2201 by a group of dissident scientists and engineers, the Cyteen star system includes the planet Cyteen and Cyteen Inner and Outer Stations. Cyteen declared its independence from Earth in 2300 CE and now serves as the capital of Union. It is located at Lalande 46650 (BD+01 4774).

The planet's atmosphere is moderately toxic to humans, necessitating enclaves, or semi-encapsulated city-states, which influences Union's political outlook. Cyteen is seen as the antithesis of Earth; the heart of Union is the research facility Reseune, the center of all research and development of human cloning. Cloned "azi" provide the additional population Union needs to exist and expand, a policy which Earth and the Alliance, Union's main rival, deplore and refuse to sanction.

Azi are incubated in vitro in "womb-tanks", but citizen (or "CIT") babies can be cloned the same way, for example to replace a dead child. The fundamental difference between azi and regular humans is that they are educated from birth via "tape", a computer-controlled combination of conditioning and biofeedback training. This technology is not limited to azi; it is used by normal humans as well, though to a lesser extent and after they have a chance to develop (i.e. usually after the age of six). This results in profound psychological differences; for example, CITs are much more capable of handling new and uncertain situations, while azi are able to concentrate better.

The overall educational programme of an azi is referred to as his or her "psychset". Designing tapes is an extremely complex discipline, since a badly designed psychset can cause azi to become emotionally unstable.

== Plot summary ==
Ariane Emory is one of fourteen "Specials", Union-certified geniuses. In addition to her research on azi, she runs Reseune (founded by her parents) with the assistance of Giraud and Denys Nye.

Emory is also a member of the Council of Nine, the elected, top-level executive body of Union. Two political factions vie for power in Union: the Centrists and the Expansionists. The latter, led by Emory, seek to enlarge Union through exploration, building new stations and continued cloning. Her political enemies, headed by Mikhail Corain, prefer to focus on the existing stations and planets. The Expansionists have held power since the foundation of Union, a situation fostered by "rejuv", which extends lifespans and staves off the effects of old age. Emory herself is 120 years old at the start of the novel – and only just beginning to show signs of aging – and has been the Councillor for Science for five decades.

Emory's former co-worker and now bitter longtime rival, Jordan Warrick, is also a Special. Jordan has created and raised a clone of himself named Justin. Justin has grown up with and is very close to Grant, an experimental azi created by Emory from the slightly modified geneset of another Special. When Justin goes to work for Emory, she threatens to use Grant, who is Reseune property, for research. Using drugs and tape to overcome Justin's remaining resistance, she rapes the inexperienced seventeen-year-old. This trauma causes him to experience periodic debilitating "tape-flashes", similar to the flashbacks that PTSD sufferers experience. Justin does his best to hide the sordid matter from his "father", but Jordan eventually learns of it. He is furious and confronts Emory.

She is found dead later that day. Though it could have been accidental, there is strong suspicion that she was murdered by Jordan. He protests his innocence, but agrees to a confession in order to protect both Justin and Grant. Because of his Special status, he has legal immunity and is only exiled to an isolated research facility far from Reseune. It is later revealed that Emory's rejuv was failing and she was already dying of cancer.

Emory's last project had been the cloning of a promising young chemist to see if it was possible to recreate his abilities. An earlier attempt with Estelle Bok, the inventor of the equation that led to faster-than-light travel, had failed miserably. However, Emory believed this was due to the Bok clone growing up in a different social environment than the original. Emory's ultimate goal was to clone herself, with her successor reliving her life as closely as possible, down to her hormone levels and including two longtime bodyguard azi and companions, Florian and Catlin. Emory also created a sophisticated and powerful computer program to help guide her replacement. With her death and the resulting disruption to both Reseune and Union, the second project is begun immediately.

Ari, the clone of Emory, is raised by Jane Strassen, a top Reseune scientist in her own right and the closest match to Emory's mother Olga. In addition, Florian and Catlin are replicated (a much easier task with azi). When Ari is seven, Strassen is abruptly transferred to another planet to simulate Olga's death. Denys Nye, now Reseune Administrator, takes over Ari's rearing. By this time, it is clear that the experiment has succeeded. Not only is Ari as brilliant as her predecessor, but due to technological advances, knowledge of the original's experiences, and better parenting by Jane Strassen, Ari is several years ahead of Emory's pace and better adjusted socially.

When Ari is nearly nine, the Centrists, in a bid for power, attempt to use a scandal involving Emory – the deliberate abandonment of a secret colony on the planet Gehenna. The Reseune authorities have Ari legally recognized as Emory's clone, entitled to take possession of her predecessor's property, in order to block the release of potentially damaging information. Denys is forced to reveal to his young ward who she is and how much her life has been manipulated.

Because of deep Administration suspicion of his loyalties, Justin is warned to stay away from Ari. However, he cannot avoid bumping into her from time to time as she grows up. She comes to like him and appreciate his skills, particularly since his interests lie in her own area of research. Soon after she gains adult status, she has Justin and Grant transferred to her new department. However, when the sixteen-year-old makes a pass at him, she is shocked by his strong reaction. Justin is forced to reveal the reason. Ari discovers that Emory's rape of Justin had not just been for sex, but also a major "intervention" to free him from his father's domination, so he could work for Emory; it was left unfinished when she died. The younger Ari repairs the damage as best she can.

Ari also comes to terms with the fact that she is much like her predecessor; it is sometimes hard to know where Emory's memories stop and Ari's start. She takes up the original's ultra-secret agenda, revealed to her by Base One, her guiding computer program, and unknown to anyone else. Emory had undertaken to restructure Union society to, in her view, save it from eventual collapse.

Giraud Nye had taken over Emory's seat in the Council of Nine after her death. A major political crisis is precipitated by his death from old age, as well as the Paxers – a terrorist group – manipulating Jordan. An attempt on Ari's life is barely foiled when Justin's just-in-time warning enables Florian and Catlin to deal with an unexpected would-be assassin. Such a major breach in security could only have come from a top-rank Reseune source. Ari suspects Denys Nye. When Denys tries to lure her in for another try by promising to resign, Florian and Catlin kill him, much to Ari's regret.

== Characters ==
- Ariane Emory I – Director of Reseune
- Ariane Emory II – clone of Emory I
- Florian and Catlin – azi bodyguards to Emory I; both are "put down" after Emory I's death and replicated for Emory II
- Denys Nye – Reseune Administrator after death of Emory I; takes custody of young Emory II after Jane Strassen's departure
- Giraud Nye – Denys Nye's brother and head of Reseune Security; Councillor of Science after death of Emory I
- Jordan Warrick – Reseune tape designer specializing in educational tapes
- Paul – azi companion and lover of Jordan Warrick; caretaker of Justin and Grant
- Justin Warrick – clone and son of Jordan Warrick
- Grant – azi created by Emory I from the genome of another Special; raised as Justin's "brother", later becomes his lover
- Jane Strassen – Reseune scientist; acts as substitute mother to Emory II until she is seven
- Yanni Schwartz – Reseune scientist; teacher and boss of Justin Warrick until his transfer; succeeds Denys Nye as Reseune Administrator
- Petros Ivanov – Reseune doctor
- Amy Carnath, Maddy Strassen, 'Stasi Ramirez, Tommy Carnath, Sam Whitely – friends of Emory II from childhood; secretly recruited into her clique
- Ollie – azi assistant and lover to Jane Strassen
- Seely – azi assistant to Denys Nye
- Abban – azi assistant to Giraud Nye
- Nelly – azi nursemaid to young Emory II
- Mikhail Corain – Citizens' Councillor, moderate leader of the Centrist Party
- Leonid Gorodin – Admiral, Councillor of Defense
- Vladislaw Khalid – Councillor of Defense, successor to Gorodin, and foe of Reseune; rival of Corain
- Catherine Lao – Councillor of Information and supporter of Reseune

== Awards and nominations ==
- 1989 – Hugo Award for Best Novel: winner
- 1989 – SF Chronicle Award, Best Novel: winner
- 1989 – British Science Fiction Association Award, Best SF Novel: nomination
- 1989 – Locus Award, Best SF Novel: winner
- 1998 – Locus Award, All-Time Best SF Novel before 1990: position 38

== Other editions ==
In 1989 the novel was published in a three-volume edition:

- Cyteen: The Betrayal
- Cyteen: The Rebirth
- Cyteen: The Vindication

Cherryh has expressed her disapproval of this edition, writing, "by my wishes, all future publications, will have Cyteen as one unified book."

== Sources ==
- C. J. Cherryh. Cyteen. Warner Books 1995. ISBN 0-446-67127-4.
