= Alliance–Union universe =

Fictional universe created by C. J. Cherryh

The Alliance–Union universe is a fictional universe created by American writer C. J. Cherryh. It is the setting for a future history series extending from the 21st century into the far future.

To date, the corpus of the Alliance–Union universe consists of 27 science fiction novels along with a series of seven short story anthologies edited by Cherryh and a few other miscellaneous works. It encompasses both books for which Cherryh won the Hugo Award for Best Novel, Downbelow Station and Cyteen, and also incorporates various other series books such as the Faded Sun trilogy, the Chanur novels, the four Morgaine books, and the Merovingen Nights shared universe series.

== Description ==
The Alliance–Union universe is a fictional future history created by Cherryh. It spans the third and fourth millennia, and is centered around humanity's exploration and colonization of space. Three economic powers have arisen: Earth Company, operating from Earth; the Alliance, a confederation of trade merchants operating interstellar freighters between Earth, space stations and colonized planets; and the Union, a breakaway government based on the planet of Cyteen. The Earth Company's attempts to control the expansions into space are defeated during the Company Wars, and the Union clashes with both the Alliance and Earth Company in their quest to expand their territories using cloned humans called azi.

In addition to Cherryh's Company War novels, her Alliance–Union universe also comprises several other novel series, including The Faded Sun Trilogy, the Compact Space series and the Merovingen Nights shared universe. Patricia Monk suggested in her paper "The shared universe: an experiment in speculative fiction" that linking these Alliance–Union series in a common future history creates a "megatext" or "collage novel".

== History ==
As humanity reaches out to the stars, space stations are financed by the private Sol Corporation, eventually renamed the Earth Company. Each new station is built by the previous one and is located ever farther away from Earth. In the days before faster-than-light travel (FTL), nine stations are laboriously constructed around nine stars, all lacking habitable planets.

The stationers and the merchanters who man the ships that supply them both develop distinct cultural identities, but remain psychologically and to some degree materially dependent on Earth. Still, directives from Earth arrive hopelessly out-of-date and are routinely ignored, making the Earth Company's attempts to maintain control increasingly futile.

When Pell's World is discovered in the Tau Ceti system, the fragile economic and political equilibrium is disrupted. Not only is this new planet's biosphere reasonably hospitable to humans – requiring only gas masks and air tanks for survival – but it also supports intelligent alien life, the gentle, technologically primitive Hisa, called "Downers" by humans. Importantly, human crops can be grown on Pell's World, dangerously weakening Earth's economic dominance. After the construction of Pell Station above the planet, colonists expand outward in space with renewed vigor and build additional stations even more distant from Earth.

The first successful FTL probe using newly developed jump technology is launched in 2248. Earth takes advantage of the breakthrough to try to re-assert its authority among the colonists. With a poor understanding of stationers and merchanters alike, its clumsy attempts backfire, provoking first unrest, then occasional armed clashes, and eventually rebellion. As the situation spirals out of control, the Earth Company commissions the building of 50 military carriers, the "Company Fleet", under the command of Conrad Mazian, to enforce its orders.

The situation culminates in 2300 with the declaration of an independent Union by the colonists centered at the Cyteen system, another habitable planet and space station at Lalande 46650, precipitating outright war. Union augments its population and armed forces with genetically engineered and psychologically conditioned human clones, called azi, which are seen as an abomination by Earth.

Fighting between the Fleet and Union forces is fierce during the ensuing "Company War". The stations closest to Earth, disturbed by the azi and other Union developments, remain loyal to Earth; several of these are destroyed by Union action. With sporadic, inadequate support from Earth, the Fleet has no choice but to forcibly requisition equipment and personnel from the increasingly alienated merchanters. These measures, however, only serve to maintain the existing warships. Without new ships to replace its combat losses, the Fleet gradually begins to lose a war of attrition.

Caught in the middle are the merchanter families and Pell Station, the primary transit point between Earth and Union space. The conflict comes to a head at Pell in late 2352 and early 2353, as described in the novel Downbelow Station. Faced with the increasingly dangerous situation, many of the merchanter families finally band together to form the Alliance, creating a third, neutral power, soon after a team arrives from Earth to negotiate an end to the conflict.

Mazian refuses to accept the peace, and the Fleet continues to fight on, this time in the service of his ambition. When Signy Mallory, one of his most senior captains, learns of his plans to seize control of Earth itself, she and her ship, Norway, defect to the new Alliance, becoming the core of its militia. The remainder of the Fleet remains loyal to Mazian, but he is forced to launch his coup attempt prematurely. Forewarned, Earth manages to defend itself.

With Earth turned against the "Mazianni", Union sees a chance to finally rid itself of its bitter enemy. Because Union does not dare weaken its forces at this crucial juncture to guard its rear against the newborn state, the Alliance is able to broker a favorable peace treaty, with Pell Station as its de facto home base. The treaty cedes to the Alliance a monopoly on interstellar commerce, even within Union, giving it the power to shut down stations simply by withholding trade.

The Mazianni are gradually driven off, as mentioned in Rimrunners and Merchanter's Luck. In Tripoint, however, it is revealed that they have discovered another habitable world and are establishing a colony there.

As the danger of the Mazianni recedes, a new rivalry develops, between the Alliance and Union. Union resents the treaty restrictions, while the Alliance fears being overwhelmed by Union's much larger population. Tensions rise further when Gehenna, a precious habitable planet in the Alliance sphere of influence, is found to harbor a population descended from a secret Union military mission deliberately abandoned there to deny the Alliance an easy acquisition.

Meanwhile, within the Union, two political factions vie to determine its future. Unbeknownst to either, scientist and political leader Ariane Emory has her own agenda.

The events depicted in the first books in the series, Heavy Time and Hellburner, take place shortly after the start of the war. Most of the books set in this universe, however, take place subsequent to the establishment of both the Alliance and the breakaway Union, hence the label "Alliance–Union" universe.

== Genre ==
Many of the works in this universe are set in space, and are usually described as space opera, while those set on planets can be seen as planetary romances. Works such as Cyteen and Downbelow Station are also regarded as hard science fiction. The "Company Wars" novels and the Faded Sun trilogy concerning the Mri Wars are examples of the military science fiction subgenre. The Merovingen Nights series takes place on a single planet and features swashbuckling heroes and low levels of technology, and as such might be classified as science fantasy, borrowing elements from the historic sword and planet subgenre; this is also true for The Morgaine Cycle books, set remotely in time and space from the main sequence. Unlike most works in this universe, the novel Voyager in Night also borrows elements from horror fiction.

== Books and reading order ==
For a complete list of works in the Alliance–Union universe, see the article C. J. Cherryh bibliography

Cherryh has stated that with two exceptions, the books set in the Alliance–Union universe can be read in any order, "just like real history". The first exception she notes is the two novels Heavy Time and Hellburner, which should be read in that order (as originally published and as compiled together in the omnibus edition Devil to the Belt). The two are prequels to Downbelow Station, although they can be read either before or after that novel. The second exception is Cyteen and its sequel Regenesis, which are tightly linked and should be read in that order too.

The novels in the Faded Sun trilogy are designed to be read in sequence, as are the books within the Chanur and Morgaine series. The Merovingen Nights series begins with the novel Angel with the Sword and then continues to the short story anthologies, numbered 1 through 7.

== Major characters ==
- Pyanfar Chanur, Hani captain of one of her clan's merchant starships, the Pride of Chanur; later leader of the Compact, a loose confederation of diverse species that deliberately excludes humans lest they disrupt the delicate balance of power (the Chanur novels)
- Sten Duncan, Alliance Security special forces soldier; human who "goes native" and joins the Mri; serves as mediator between the Mri and humans (the Faded Sun trilogy)
- Ariane Emory-1, superb scientist and Union administrator of the influential and politically powerful Reseune research complex, source of most azi innovations (Cyteen)
- Ariane Emory-2 PR (Personal Replicate), clone of Ariane Emory created after her progenitor's death (Cyteen, Regenesis)
- Damon Konstantin, Pell Station administrator and ex-officio leader of the Merchanter Alliance; husband of Elene Quen (Downbelow Station)
- Elene Quen, co-founder of the Merchanter's Alliance; last survivor of the respected Quen merchanter family, casualties of the Company War (Downbelow Station)
- Conrad Mazian, brilliant commander of the outnumbered Earth Company Fleet; after the end of the Company War, leader of the renegade Mazianni, the remnant of the Fleet, except ECS Norway, that survived the war (Downbelow Station)
- Signy Mallory, captain of the Earth Company military carrier ship Norway; defects to the Alliance after Mazian turns against Earth; her ship (along with the armed superfreighter Finity's End) forms the core of the newborn Alliance's militia (Downbelow Station, Merchanter's Luck)
- Elizabeth McGee, Union scientist (Forty Thousand in Gehenna)
- James Robert Neihart, senior captain of Finity's End and one of the Merchanter Alliance negotiators (Finity's End)
- Kurt Morgan, sole surviving crewman of the Alliance ship Endymion, participant in the Hanan Rebellion and the wars of the Nemet race (Brothers of Earth)
- Raen a Sul hant Meth-maren, sole survivor and head of the Sul sept of the Meth-Maren House of the Kontrin company; human mediator with the alien, hive-mind Majat (Serpent's Reach)
- Thorn, Hatani guild member; human raised by the Shonunin to be their ambassador to his species (Cuckoo's Egg)

== Sentient alien species ==
Cherryh has been praised for her complex, well-developed alien cultures. Her Alliance–Union universe features numerous sentient alien species, including the following:

Species name	Home system	Home planet	Appearing in	Notes
Amaut		Kesuat	Hunter of Worlds	Industrious, stocky humanoids; little regard for other races that are in the way of valuable resources
Ahnit			Wave Without a Shore	
Caliban		Gehenna	Forty Thousand in Gehenna	Large, semi-reptilians of uncertain and varying intelligence; some bond telepathically with the descendants of 40,000 colonists deliberately abandoned by Union on a planet in the Alliance sphere of influence (to cause trouble for the rival power)
Chi		Chchchoh	Chanur novels	Sticklike, yellow methane-breathers; frenetic; linked to T'ca
Elee	Na'i'in	Kutath	Faded Sun trilogy	Humanoid, artistic, perhaps akin to Mri
Hani	Ahr	Anuurn (Ahr II)	Chanur novels	Bipedal felines, with many parallels to lions; matriarchal society – only females travel off-planet, as merchants and traders; males are considered too unstable, at least until Pyanfar Chanur changes the rules
Hisa	Pell's Star (Tau Ceti)	Pell's World (also known as Downbelow)	Downbelow Station, Finity's End, Merchanter's Luck	Peaceful brown-furred bipedal mammalians; called "Downers" by Pell stationers, they use little technology
Iduve	Kej	Kej IV	Hunter of Worlds	Dangerous, psychic, predatory humanoids who travel in lone, huge, immensely powerful spaceships and terrorize other species with their sometimes incomprehensible behavior; more technologically advanced than any other known civilization; members of several species, including at least one human, have been forcibly taken as slaves
Kallia		Aus Qao	Hunter of Worlds	thin, hollow-boned humanoids; vehement pacifists
Kif	Akkt	Akkht	Chanur novels	Long-snouted bipedal carnivores; extremely competitive; quick to shift "loyalty" to whoever is in power (or likely to take over, in their frequent, often lethal power struggles)
Knnn	Unknown	Unknown	Chanur novels	Multi-legged methane-breathers; packrats; chaotic; they (along with the Tc'a) control the most advanced jump tech in the Compact, capable of maneuvers no others can match
Majat	Alpha Hydri	Cerdin (Alpha Hydri II or III, depending on source)	Serpent's Reach	Hive-mind insectoids – the entire species consists of only four distinct hive-minds, identified by the Meth-maren by color (blue, green, red and gold)
Mahendo'sat		Iji	Chanur novels	Highly political mammalians and therefore not especially trustworthy; introduced the Hani to space travel
Mri	Na'i'in	Kutath	Faded Sun trilogy	Humanoid; tripartite caste-based society; militaristic
Nemet			Brothers of Earth	Humanoid; strict honor-based society; reminiscent of Atevi, Mri, and Shonunin
Regul	Mab	Nurag	Faded Sun trilogy	Xenophobic; juvenile and adult forms are highly differentiated; eidetic memory; averse to direct violence, prefer to employ other species for such to remain out of harm's way
Stsho		Llyene	Chanur novels	Hermaphroditic; physically and emotionally fragile
Sharrh			Merovingen Nights series	Advanced; aggressive; territorial
Shonunin			Cuckoo’s Egg	Bipedal mammalians; their technology is less advanced than humanity's, being approximately equivalent to that of 20th-century Earth
Tc'a		Oh’a’o’o’o	Chanur novels	Serpentine methane-breathers; multipartite brains; linked somehow to the Chi, though the exact nature of the relationship is not made clear; highly advanced

The novels Port Eternity and Voyager in Night feature additional sentient alien races. The Morgaine books are built around the actions of a humanoid race called the Qual, Khal and similar names, while Morgaine herself is a half-blood member of the "ancestors of the qual", and the third book in the series features an arboreal species called the Harilim.

== Planets ==
=== Pell's World ===
Pell's World, also known as Downbelow, is a planet orbiting Tau Ceti; it was discovered by a probe in 2093. It was the first planet in the Alliance–Union universe to be discovered by humans that has an advanced ecosystem and, more significantly, intelligent extraterrestrial life, the Hisa. Pell Station, a space station prominent in this universe, orbits the planet. It was the discovery of sentient life that sent shock waves back to Earth, sparking off moral, religious, philosophical and policy debates. Then, to aggravate an already delicate situation, Pell Station became a source of agricultural goods and other luxuries, hitherto only available from Earth. This economic advantage disrupted the whole balance of power in the Alliance–Union universe, and became one of the main contributing factors to the outbreak of the Company Wars in 2300.

Pell's World and the Hisa feature in a number of Alliance–Union universe novels, in particular Downbelow Station (1981) and Finity's End (1997).

=== Gehenna ===
Gehenna is a rare habitable Alliance–Union universe planet in the Zeta Reticuli system, and home to the calibans, sentient lizard-like creatures. Although in Alliance space, it was secretly colonized by the Union, and then abandoned for the Alliance to discover a lost colony on what should have been a pristine planet.

Gehenna features in two Alliance–Union universe novels, Forty Thousand in Gehenna (1983) and Cyteen (1988).

=== Cyteen ===
Cyteen is a planet deep in Union territory that was discovered between 2125 and 2201; it was found to have nonsentient life. Two space stations were constructed in orbit around the planet, the Inner and Outer Stations. The planet's atmosphere is toxic to humans and necessitated terraforming and the establishment of enclaves, or semi-encapsulated city-states. Its native life is also toxic, although it was the source of Cyteen's rejuvenation drug.

Cyteen features in several of the Alliance–Union universe novels, most notably Cyteen (1988).

=== Merovin ===
Planet Merovin is isolated, forsaken by the rest of humanity because of poor interstellar relations with an aggressive alien species, the Sharrh. Due to this, the level of technology on the planet is quite backwards for the 33rd century. For example, most personal weaponry is of the knife or sword variety; relatively few firearms are available and in any case nothing more advanced than a revolver.

Merovin features in the novel Angel with the Sword (1985), and the Merovingen Nights series of shared universe anthologies.

== Technologies ==
In addition to the advanced technologies required to mine the asteroids, send slower-than-light vessels to nearby stars, and establish large space stations there, signature futuristic technologies of the Alliance–Union universe are:

- The jump drive, derived from the theoretical physics work of Estelle Bok at Cyteen Station in 2230, allowing faster-than-light travel. Ships enter a specific jump point (a large collection of matter that are not large enough to achieve fusion, such as brown dwarfs or rogue planets), shift into a space parallel to normal space and re-enter normal space at another jump point.
- Rejuv, a life-extension drug derived from lifeforms on the planet Cyteen sometime in the 2220s
- Human cloning technology, developed and used to a high degree in Union, where azi—genetically tailored laborers, technicians, soldiers and spies who lack civil rights (although they can acquire them)—are created. An azi genetic type's cognitive level is rated using a Greek-letter system similar to that in Aldous Huxley's Brave New World.
- Subliminal conditioning and information transfer, known as tape, which is used for a variety of purposes. A technology similar to tape, mindwipe, is used to create a blank-slate psychology and artificial amnesia in criminals, those with catastrophic psychological conditions, and deep-penetration secret agents.
- Terraforming technologies were used by Union to make some areas of the planet Cyteen suitable for Earth-based life.

== Society ==
A broad trend in the Alliance–Union universe is the divergence of fundamental attitudes in planet-dwellers, space station-dwellers, and starship crews. Planet dwellers (ordinary residents of Earth and Cyteen) seem to have many of the same attitudes and concerns as 21st century people in developed countries. The space-dwelling populations find it strange that planet-dwellers fight over things like energy sources and territory (which are plentiful in space) but act in a cavalier and wasteful manner toward their physical environment (which must be carefully tended in space).

Space station residents (stationers) tend toward extreme caution towards both their physical as well as social and economic environments, since an unplanned change in any of them could be fatal to the entire station population. For example, a great deal of the conflict in Downbelow Station is caused by Pell Station's need to absorb a large refugee population, for which they do not have adequate housing or jobs.

Starship crew (spacers) have an extremely insular world-view engendered by the time-dilation effects of jump; this attitude was even more extreme before the jump drive was developed, when travel between stars took years. Merchant starships are all crewed by extended families, which occasionally fission if the family prospers enough to purchase another ship. Merchanter women will often have unprotected sex while in port in order to become pregnant and preserve genetic diversity in their crew-families. Spacer self-identification is so great that many spacers would rather starve to death than accept "grounding" and a stationer's life. Spacers often feel they can only relate to other spacers, since stationers and planet-dwellers seem to rapidly age and die from their perspective.

Additionally, in Union, there is a cultural and psychological division between the unengineered citizen population ("CITs" or "born-men") and the azi. Azi are treated by CITs on a continuum between outright slavery and the companionship of equals; in many ways they are treated like children, since they are vulnerable to stimuli that lie outside the coping abilities of their artificially constructed psychologies. The majority view in Union is that azi are necessary to preserve the technological and industrial base of their many space settlements, while a minority wants to abolish the practice and cease azi production. The majority view is apt to be the more stable and persistent, since azi can, in time, become citizens whose children are born CITs, and these children receive their basic values from their parents. This process is the result of deliberate social engineering on the part of Reseune, the Cyteen-based center of all research and development concerning human cloning.

=== Mazianni ===
The Mazianni is a term which refers to the military starships and their crews who remain loyal to their commander, the charismatic, ambitious Conrad Mazian, when he renounces his allegiance to Earth.

The ships had begun their existence as the 50-ship strong Earth Company Fleet, sent out to enforce Earth's control of its star stations. In the long Company War between Earth and the breakaway Union, their number had been whittled down to 15 patchwork ships with waning loyalty to an increasingly indifferent Earth. Losing a war of attrition, Mazian devises a subtle, dangerous plan to establish a firebreak between Union and Earth. The Fleet retreats to Pell after the war.

Mazian makes the fateful decision to rebel and attempt to take over Earth itself. Downbelow Station ends with his (implied) failure, and the defection of one of his most senior captains, Signy Mallory, and her ship Norway to the newborn Merchanter's Alliance, based at Pell. The remaining ships, outlawed by all three major powers, return to guerrilla warfare: hit-and-run raids and preying on merchant ships for replacement personnel and equipment. At least three subsequent merchanter novels mention the Mazianni. It is suggested that the Mazianni may have secretly discovered and settled their own habitable world.

== Songs ==
C. J. Cherryh wrote a collection of songs about the station trade in the Alliance–Union universe. These were recorded by filk musician Leslie Fish and others, and released in 1985 on an album entitled Finity's End.

== Critical reception ==
Science fiction and fantasy critic John Clute called the Alliance–Union universe Cherryh's "central achievement". Writing in The Encyclopedia of Science Fiction, Clute added that while the universe's structure is "rough at the edges", reading a novel in the series creates the impression that it is part of a larger history yet to be revealed. In a biography of Cherryh in the Historical Dictionary of Science Fiction in Literature, M. Keith Booker described the Alliance–Union universe as "so far-reaching that its overall outlines remain unclear and continue to develop".

== Works cited ==
- Bernardo, Susan (2004). "Of Emorys and Warricks: Self-Creation in Cyteen". In Carmien, Edward (ed.). The Cherryh Odyssey. Borgo Press. pp. 164–176. ISBN 0-8095-1071-5.
- Romey, Elizabeth (2004). "Dr. Ariane Emory, Sr.: Psychopath—Or Savior?". In Carmien, Edward (ed.). The Cherryh Odyssey. Borgo Press. pp. 177–194. ISBN 0-8095-1071-5.
- Stinson, J. G. (2004). "The Human as Other in the Science Fiction Novels of C.J. Cherryh". In Carmien, Edward (ed.). The Cherryh Odyssey. Borgo Press. pp. 133–148. ISBN 0-8095-1071-5.
