= Rimrunners =

1989 science fiction novel by C. J. Cherryh

- Cover of the first edition.
- Author: C. J. Cherryh
- Cover artist: Don Maitz
- Language: English
- Genre: Science fiction
- Publisher: Warner Books
- Publication date: June 1989
- Publication place: United States
- Media type: Print (Paperback)
- Pages: 327 (hardback edition)
- ISBN: 0-446-51514-0
- OCLC: 18520900
- Dewey Decimal: 813/.54 19
- LC Class: PS3553.H358 R56 1989

Rimrunners is a science fiction novel by American writer C. J. Cherryh, set in her Alliance-Union universe, in which humanity has split into three major power blocs: Union, the Merchanter's Alliance and Earth. Chronologically, the book follows immediately after the author's Downbelow Station and is one of Cherryh's series of "Merchanter" novels.

The book was nominated for a Locus Award, and the cover art, by Don Maitz, won the 1990 Hugo Award for Best Original Artwork.

== Plot summary ==
The long, bitterly fought Company War between Earth and Union had ended – for everyone except Conrad Mazian, commander of the Earth Company Fleet. By refusing to accept the peace, he and his loyal Mazianni became outlaws, hunted by all sides.

Elizabeth 'Bet' Yeager had been one of Mazian's marines, a twenty-year veteran. Stranded on Pell Station when the Fleet was forced to pull out abruptly (as told in Downbelow Station), she managed to blend in with the many displaced war refugees. Since then, she survived by taking whatever starship berths she could find. Her luck begins to run out when her latest ship, the freighter Ernestine, is forced to return to Pell for major repairs, a destination too fraught with danger for her. She stays behind on the decrepit, dying Thule Station. Day after day, she goes to the employment office, but there is little work. Few starships call and the ones that do, do not need the skills she can admit to possessing.

Late one night, while trying to sleep in a dockside washroom, she is attacked by a man and, weak from hunger, barely manages to kill him. In desperation, she moves in with a lowlife bartender. When he tries to control her, with threats to go to the authorities about his suspicions about her, she dispatches him too. With time running out before his body is discovered, she signs up with the ship Loki, a barely legitimate 'spook' that survives by gathering intelligence and selling it.

Loki is not a typical merchanter ship; instead of a close-knit family, the crew consists of unrelated hire-ons. As a result, various competing cliques have formed aboard and Bet has to navigate her way among them. She becomes friends with Musa, a universally respected crewman who claims to have served on one of the ancient sublighters, the original nine vessels that predated faster-than-light ships. She is also strongly attracted to Ramey, an ex-merchanter and surly outcast with a nickname of NG (no good). She gradually makes a place for herself and even manages to get the reluctant NG tentatively readmitted back into shipboard society.

Things get complicated when she is forced to reveal her past, especially since Loki is currently hunting a Mazianni ship. Long overdue for a major overhaul, Loki limps into Thule, hooks up to the sole starship fuel pump and takes on all the available fuel. While there, the ship they were searching for (Keu's India) shows up. The Mazianni ship had been harried and hunted by Alliance and Union forces to the point that it was blocked from its regular supply bases and is desperately low on fuel. Keu needs to take the precious pump and fuel intact, so he can not just blow Loki up. Instead, he sends boarding parties of armored marines, but Bet and Fitch between them manage to hold them off. Then the Alliance warship Norway arrives to close the trap and administer the coup de grâce. Bet's actions during the battle prove to her crewmates that she can be trusted; she has found a (relatively) safe haven.

== Characters ==
Thule Station personnel

- Don Ely – Thule Registry, befriends Yeager
- Nan Jodree – Thule Registry

Loki crew

- Wolfe – captain
- Fitch – first officer (mainday)
- Orsini – first officer (alterday)
- Ramey (NG) – systems engineer
- Elizabeth Yeager (Bet) – ex-Africa tac-squad sergeant

== Sources ==
- Cherryh, C. J. Rimrunners, Warner Aspect, 1989.
