= Finity's End =

1997 novel by C. J. Cherryh

- Finity's End cover
- Author: C. J. Cherryh
- Language: English
- Genre: Science fiction
- Publisher: Warner Aspect
- Publication date: August 1997
- Publication place: United States
- Media type: Print (hardback & paperback)
- Pages: 471 (hardback edition)
- ISBN: 0-446-52072-1
- OCLC: 36029644
- Dewey Decimal: 813/.54 21
- LC Class: PS3553.H358 F56 1997

Finity's End is a science fiction novel by American writer C. J. Cherryh. It is part of the Merchanter novels series, set in her Alliance-Union universe, in which humanity has split into three major power blocs: Union, the Merchanter's Alliance and Earth. Finity's End was shortlisted for a Locus Award in 1998. It constitutes a loose sequel to Downbelow Station.

== Plot summary ==
It is eighteen years after the end of the Company War, at least as stationers experience time, less for merchants subject to the effects of time dilation in the course of their travels. Regardless, the threat of the piratical Mazianni is ebbing. The Neiharts and their superfreighter Finity's End had spent the post-war years assisting the Alliance militia hunt down the renegades. But now, the oldest of all working merchanter families wants to return to trading.

When the ship docks at Pell Station, the heart of the Alliance, the family retrieves one of its own. Fletcher Neihart's mother had been stranded there by the fortunes of war, giving birth to him on the station. Unable to adjust to stationer life, she had committed suicide when he was five years old, leaving him to suffer through a succession of foster homes. The lonely outsider had been befriended by a couple of hisa, the gentle, intelligent natives of Pell's World. Now a young man of seventeen with dreams of working on the planet, he is furious when he is handed over against his will to his relatives as part of a deal between Elene Quen, Stationmaster of Pell, and senior Finity Captain James Robert Neihart.

The Neiharts had suffered great casualties in the war and afterwards; half the crew died in one catastrophic decompression in combat. Due to this and also because it was impractical to raise children in wartime, the youngest generation consists of only three orphaned "junior-juniors": Jeremy (Fletcher's new roommate), Vince and Linda. Fletcher should have been about the same age, but due to time dilation, he is four or five years older.

Finity's End (first British hard cover edition, 1997)

Fletcher is a surly anomaly; he is as old as the more numerous senior-juniors, but has no shipboard knowledge and experience. A botched traditional initiation results in a fistfight between Fletcher and Chad, a senior-junior cousin. JR, the leader of the senior-juniors, tries putting him in charge of the three youngsters. The responsibility (and implied trust), as well as his friendship with Jeremy, gradually reconcile him to his new life. Even the initially hostile Vince and Linda come to look to him for leadership and approval.

It all comes crashing down when Fletcher's spirit stick, a valuable gift from the hisa leader Satin (from Downbelow Station), is stolen. Suspicion and distrust grow on both sides. When Chad provokes another fight with Fletcher, Jeremy finally confesses that he was responsible. To safeguard the artifact from resentful relatives, he had hidden it in his hotel room at their last stop, only to have it stolen. The merchanter Champlain is a suspect; Champlain is also believed to be one of those secretly supplying the Mazianni.

Meanwhile, Captain Neihart has vastly more important issues to deal with. At every port of call, he forges agreements with merchanters, Union officials and stationmasters to try to bring about a transition to peacetime, legitimate trade, and at the same time shut down the smugglers and the black market from which the Mazianni obtain supplies.

When they find Champlain docked at their next stop, Jeremy drags Fletcher to shady curio shops, hoping to find the spirit stick. He succeeds, but as the senior captains are locked in vital negotiations, Fletcher is instructed to keep his charges in their hotel room and wait. However, the impatient twelve-year-old Jeremy goes back and tries to shoplift it, only to be caught. Fletcher attempts to rescue Jeremy and is captured as well. As they are being led away at gunpoint to be quietly disposed of, Fletcher manages to engineer their escape. The resulting investigation pressures the corrupt, reluctant stationmaster into agreeing to Captain Neihart's proposals. Fletcher wins the approval of his family, and he accepts Finity's End as his home.

== Characters ==
=== Human ===
- James Robert Neihart senior – senior captain of Finity's End
- James Robert Neihart junior (known as 'JR', to distinguish him from James Robert senior) – leader of the senior-juniors of Finity's End, later promoted to junior captain
- Jeremy Neihart – junior-junior
- Fletcher Robert Neihart – planetary science student at Pell; reluctant crewmember of Finity's End

=== Hisa (on Pell) ===
- Melody – Fletcher's hisa surrogate mother
- Patch – Fletcher's hisa surrogate father
- Satin – an aged leader of the hisa (also appears in Downbelow Station)

== Classification ==
On her website, Cherryh writes that she has twice seen this novel misclassified by hasty reviewers as a young adult novel, presumably because the protagonists are young. She rejects this label, stating "It's a piece of the Alliance-Union universe, and teens, in the case of teens who've lived 40 time-dilated years, are a fairly different piece of work, psychologically speaking. I definitely call that science fiction—not y/a."

== Other media ==
C.J. Cherryh also wrote a song about the story of the Merchanter series, named "Finity's End", a decade before the novel was published. The song was recorded by the filk musician Leslie Fish and published together with other songs from Cherryh's universe on an album with the same name in 1985.

The song was reworked into a story of the history of the free software movement in 2007 and released as "Infinite Hands" under the GPL and other free licenses with permission of Leslie Fish and C. J. Cherryh.
