= Patricia Monk =

Canadian professor (1938–2021)

- Born: 1938; Stockport, England, United Kingdom
- Died: 29 December 2021 (aged 83); Halifax, Nova Scotia, Canada

Academic background
- Education: Reading University (BA); Carleton University (MA); Queen's University at Kingston (PhD)

Academic work
- Discipline: English literature
- Sub-discipline: Canadian literature; Science fiction
- Institutions: Dalhousie University

Patricia Monk (1938–2021) was a professor at Dalhousie University from 1970 to her retirement in 2003. She was the first woman to be promoted to full professor in Dalhousie's English department and is known for her work on Canadian literature and science fiction. She was born in Stockport, England and died at the age of 83 on 29 December 2021 in Halifax, Nova Scotia.

== Selected publications ==
- Alien Theory: The Alien as Archetype in the Science Fiction Short Story (2006)
- Mud and Magic Shows: Robertson Davies's Fifth Business (1992)
- The Gilded Beaver: An Introduction to the Life and Work of James De Mille (Toronto: ECW Press, 1991)
- The Smaller Infinity: Jungian Self in the Novels of Robertson Davies (1982)
