= Merchanter's Luck =

1982 novel by C. J. Cherryh

- First edition cover
- Author: C. J. Cherryh
- Cover artist: Barclay Shaw
- Language: English
- Series: Alliance-Union universe, the Merchanter novels
- Genre: Science fiction
- Publisher: DAW Books
- Publication date: July 1, 1982
- Publication place: United States
- Media type: Print (paperback)
- Pages: 208 (paperback)
- ISBN: 0-88677-139-0
- OCLC: 42454975
- Preceded by: Downbelow Station
- Followed by: Rimrunners

Merchanter's Luck is a science fiction novel by American writer C. J. Cherryh. It is set in the author's Alliance-Union universe, in which humanity has split into three major power blocs: Union, the Merchanter's Alliance and Earth. In the context of the Alliance-Union universe, the book is one of Cherryh's Merchanter novels.

Merchanter's Luck was reprinted in 2008 along with Cherryh's novel Forty Thousand in Gehenna in an omnibus volume entitled Alliance Space.

== Plot summary ==
Sandor ("Sandy") Kreja is the sole survivor of a moderately prosperous merchanter family that had operated in Union space. When he was a young boy, all but two of his relatives were killed or taken by the renegade Mazianni, once soldiers in the service of Earth, who had refused to accept the end of the Company War and turned pirate in order to keep on fighting.

The three remaining Krejas had continued to run their aged freighter, Le Cygne, as best they could. However, one died in an accident, and another died in a deal gone bad, leaving Sandy as the sole owner of the starship. Sandy kept the ship running, with hired crewmen when possible, and solo when not. He constantly changed the ship names, but as unpaid debts piled up, he ran out of safe Union ports.

At Viking station, as Edward Stevens of Lucy, Sandy has a chance sleepover with another merchanter, Allison Reilly, which proves to be pivotal to his future. Allison, one of the powerful Reillys of the superfreighter Dublin Again, lets slip that she is going "across the line" to Pell, the Alliance star system. Having heard rumours that trade between Pell and Earth might be re-established and wanting desperately to see her again, he decides to try his luck in Alliance space.

Sandy races Dublin Again to her next port, but the only way he can catch the much faster ship is by taking chances. He performs a dangerous double-jump and arrives at Pell groggy, causing a stir when he barely manages to dock. As a result, he is questioned by Alliance security, but is released when the Reillys come to his aid, not for his sake, but to protect their reputation.

At Allison's suggestion, they offer to refit Sandy's ship and provide a crew and cargo as a loan. The Reillys are also interested in the Earth trade, and the small ship would be an ideal conduit. Sandy swallows his pride and accepts the generous deal.

Science Fiction Book Club hardcover edition cover

As it turns out, Allison has an ulterior motive. She is a junior officer in charge of her own small group within the much larger group in command of Dublin Again, but many, many years stand between her and a "posted" position with real responsibility. By transferring with her crew to the smaller ship, she can satisfy her ambition immediately.

Things seem to be going well for once. Then Sandy is called in to meet the head of the Alliance military, the notorious Signy Mallory, who had once been one of the renegade Mazian's captains. She gives him a sealed priority military cargo to be delivered to stations being reopened Earthward.

The trip is tense; Sandy and his new crew do not trust each other. He refuses to release the computer safeguards that have protected him in the past, preferring to size up the Reillys first. Curran, Allison's second in command, tries to force him to give up the security codes, but Sandy refuses to back down and a fight breaks out. The result is an ugly, festering stalemate.

When they arrive at the Venture star system, they are intercepted and boarded by Mazianni from the warship Australia. Sandy orders his crew to hide, while he and Curran try to talk their way out. He is taken to Tom Edger, Mazian's senior captain. Sandy offers to work for him and is then told that his cargo is worthless scrap. Mallory had used him as bait to flush out her enemy. Edger decides he might have a use for Sandy, but Curran is taken away. Fighting to get his crewman back, both Sandy and Curran are shot and left for dead as the Mazianni begin to evacuate.

At that moment, Mallory's Norway, the armed Alliance superfreighter Finity's End, and Dublin Again rush in to engage the fleeing Edger (although he gets away) and free the station. Sandy and Curran survive the battle.

When the dust settles, Mallory clears Sandy's name and title to his ship in return for having put him in mortal danger. His crew now trust him wholeheartedly and Sandy has the nucleus he needs to revive the Kreja family, returning his ship to its original name, Le Cygne.

== Main characters ==
=== Merchanter freighter Le Cygne (also known as Lucy) ===
- Sandor Kreja (aka Edward Stevens) – captain

=== Merchanter superfreighter Dublin Again ===
- Michael Reilly – captain
- Allison Reilly – helm 21
- Curran Reilly – helm 22

=== Alliance warship Norway ===
- Signy Mallory – captain

=== Mazianni warship Australia ===
- Tom Edger – captain
