= Devil to the Belt =

2000 science fiction omnibus by C. J. Cherryh

- Devil to the Belt cover
- Author: C. J. Cherryh
- Language: English
- Genre: Science fiction
- Publisher: Aspect
- Publication date: December 1, 2000
- Publication place: United States
- Media type: Print (Paperback)
- Pages: 608 pp (paperback)
- ISBN: 0-446-67653-5
- OCLC: 44669408

Devil to the Belt is an omnibus release from 2000 containing two science fiction novels by American writer C. J. Cherryh, Heavy Time (1991), and Hellburner (1992). They are set in Cherryh's Alliance-Union universe and are prequels to her Hugo Award–winning 1981 novel Downbelow Station. Both of the included works were nominated for the Locus Award for Best Science Fiction Novel in their respective years of eligibility. The novels and the omnibus printing were published by Warner Books, with some editions bearing the "Questar Science Fiction" or "Warner Aspect" imprints. Cherryh self-published e-book editions of Heavy Time and Hellburner in 2009 at Closed Circle Publications.

== Summary ==
Heavy Time and Hellburner are set in the Sol System at the beginning of the "Company Wars" period in the 24th century. Heavy Time introduces ASTEX, a division of the Sol Station Corporation (the Earth Company of Downbelow Station) engaged in asteroid mining for minerals to support the Earth's economy and the war effort. Disputes over mining rights, corporate corruption and economic exploitation are key plot elements in the first novel.

Both novels, especially Hellburner, are works of military science fiction, taking place amidst the development of the Earth Company Fleet of warships that are to be deployed against Union forces in the upcoming war. Military topics explored in the books include the military-industrial complex, interservice rivalry, loyalty to one's crewmates, problems in the chain of command, the role of military training, and civilian support of the armed services, among others.

== Plot of Heavy Time ==
The title is a term for the periods of time spacers spend in refinery habitats under nearly 1g, which is when they're heavy compared to their periods of weightlessness when out in the shops.

Ben and Bird are two freerunners: private prospectors who look for asteroids worth mining for heavy metals. Bird was born on Earth, fifty years ago, and has been freerunning for thirty years, whereas Ben was born twenty-something years ago in the Asteroid Belt and only started freerunning when he invested 20k in Bird's ship a few years ago.

Their ship picks up a distress signal and gets approval from "Big Mama" (the central office of the Belt) to check out the source of the signal. When they reach it, the origin ship appears intact apart from a dented fuel tank, but its power has almost run out. Inside, they find blood and bits of organic waste, and a barely-alive young man called Dekker.

They take Dekker onto their ship, clean him up, and attach the other ship to theirs and head back to base. Bird thinks the ethical course of action is to look after Dekker and not worry about his ship, but Ben, having scrimped and saved to get enough money to buy in on Bird's ship, obsesses about whether they'll have salvage rights to Dekker's ship.

Dekker is fairly incoherent whenever he talks to them but keeps asking them the time, and where his partner Cory is. He knows she went out of the ship, and wants to rescue her, but can't tell Bird and Ben what happened or why the ship ended up outside of the zone it's registered for. He seems to have lost track of time since two months earlier. They establish that where the ship was prospecting, there is now a "driver": a larger Company ore extraction ship.

Ben reacts aggressively to every word or action of Dekker's, and talks about killing Dekker so Ben and Bird can get the ship. Bird keeps trying to calm him down and intervenes between him and Dekker.

They attach Dekker to a restraining cable but he tries to force the catch on it and Ben beats him up before Bird can stop him.

Bird manages to keep the peace between them until they eventually get back to Refinery Two Base, where the police question Bird and Ben, inspect both ships, and take Dekker to the hospital. They retain all of both men's personal effects for the moment.

Ben heads down to the lower decks of Refinery Two, where few freerunners venture, to see if he can get quicker info from the company executives about whether he and Bird have any salvage rights to Dekker's ship, while Bird stays on the upper levels and meets up with two female friends of his, Meg and Sal. Ben returns to say they have a chance of getting Dekker's ship, because it didn't belong to a company, but was owned by Dekker and his partner Cory.

Dekker is in custody, being questioned by the authorities, who sedate him whenever he becomes distressed. They ask him what happened, and eventually he reveals that they were prospecting inside their registered zone and found a 1km-long ore-dense asteroid, even though most of the asteroids that rich have long since been mined to dust by the company. Cory goes on a space walk to check it out, and Dekker monitors her life signs while keeping track of the time with his watch, and then a driver comes towards, a driver not showing up on the official company charts, and doesn't slow down even when Dekker tries to hail them. He's been fretting about the time and his watch because the timer on Cory's suit wasn't reliable, so he was in charge of monitoring the time for her.

William Payne, a company executive, is tasked with handling the case and avoiding bad publicity for the company, such as would be generated by reports of an unauthorised driver killing a freerunning miner. Then bureaucratic failures allow word of Cory's death to reach her mother, a powerful politician on Mars, and she accuses Dekker of kidnapping and killing her daughter so he could inherit the other half of their ship. The police question Dekker about what happened, suggest he made up the presence of a driver.

Ben Pollard discovers that one of the asteroids he and Bird tagged as ore-rich had lost its tag before Big Mama could pay him and Bird for the claim. Then he finds the police have been searching his room, and Meg and Sal's room next door, though the police have yet to discover the datacard containing maps of that region of space, which he illegally took a copy of on the ship instead of wiping them from memory.

Bird thinks about the fact that drivers are out there extracting ore from the asteroids and then throwing it towards the refinery so fast that it's dangerous for any craft to get in the way, so it makes no sense that the driver that was on Ben and Bird's charts they were given to check out the distress beacon was not on the charts Dekker had.

The company wants to silence Dekker, avoid any publicity, whereas Cory's mother wants him prosecuted for her daughter's death.

Sal reveals to Meg that Ben kept a datacard with charts from the ship, and that Sal had revealed its existence to other friends of hers on the Base, who now want a copy of it. Those friends are Shepherds, from an organisation that protests against the company, and they're also interested in Dekker's case.

The company keeps pressuring Dekker to sign a release form without letting him speak to a lawyer. They persuade him to sign a form that looks like an insurance claim and that lets them take away his license as a freerunner, on medical grounds. Ben bribes a corporate contact to expedite his and Bird's claim to Dekker's ship, on the basis that he and Bird have been waiting too long for the police to release their own ship. This gets their ship, the Trinidad, released at last, and then they get ownership of Dekker's ship, though Bird feels bad that Dekker's being kept in hospital and has lost his license, especially when Ben wants to claim against Dekker's account for his and Bird's expenses.

The authorities persuade Dekker to sign a form stating their findings that it was a catastrophic malfunction on the ship that caused the crash, not Dekker's fault but also not the company's fault, and the doctor tells him the driver was nowhere near. Then Dekker is released from hospital, and finally discovers his pilot's license has been revoked, and then that he has lost ownership of the ship.

Dekker goes to confront Bird, wanting his ship back, and then wanting the log from his ship, but Bird tells him the authorities already wiped it. Dekker protests about his situation but Bird quietens him down, and Meg, whose dress and hairstyle reminds Dekker of the radicals he'd hung out with before he got arrested and was put in contact with Cory via an official pen pals scheme.
