= Forge of Heaven =

2004 novel by C. J. Cherryh

- Author: C. J. Cherryh
- Cover artist: Bob Eggleton
- Language: English
- Genre: Science fiction
- Publisher: HarperCollins
- Publication date: June 1, 2004
- Publication place: United States
- Pages: 416 (hardback)
- ISBN: 0-380-97903-9
- Preceded by: Hammerfall

Forge of Heaven is a science fiction novel by American science fiction and fantasy author C. J. Cherryh. It was first published in June 2004 in the United States by HarperCollins under its Eos Books imprint.

Forge of Heaven is the second of two novels set in Cherryh's Gene Wars universe, and concerns gene manipulation using nanotechnology, and contact with an alien race, the ondat. The first novel, Hammerfall was published in June 2001.

== Backstory ==
Human territory consisted of the Inner Worlds, governed by Earth Federation, who maintained strict control on the use of biotech and frowned on genetic manipulation, and Outsider Space, near the edge of human space, who openly used biotech for their own benefit. In Outsider Space a group called the Movement broke away from local authority, and by joining nanotech and biotech, bioengineered humans, livestock and agriculture for the colonizing other planets. Fearing contamination, Earth severed all direct contact with Outsider Space, but assisted the moderate Outsider governments, who themselves feared runaway biochange, in tracking down and destroying Movement bases.

The outlawed Movement moved their biotech beyond Outsider Space and onto worlds, unbeknown to them, in space occupied by an unknown alien species, the ondat. The ondat came into contact with the Movement's aggressively adaptive nanisms and unwittingly spread it to their homeworld. Unable to distinguish between the Movement, Outsiders and Earth, the aliens went to war with humankind, sparking the Gene Wars. But when they saw Earth and the Outsiders destroying Movement bases, the ondat learnt that not all humans were the enemy. After the Movement was neutralized, the ondat withdrew to their original borders, and Earth and the Outsiders maintained a shaky truce with the ondat that lasted for 300 years. Second and Third Movements later sprang up, but they were driven underground and eventually eliminated.

The ondat were an enigma: no one ever saw them and communication was all but impossible. But years after the end of the Gene Wars, an ondat ship initiated contact by entering human space and leading a human ship to a planet in ondat territory that had a functioning First Movement base. They indicated that they wanted to destroy the world, and Earth concurred, but the Outsiders wanted to rescue those on the planet and get their hands on First Movement technology that may have advanced beyond what they had previously encountered. Earth yielded to the Outsider's request because they knew that if the ondat ever started a bioengineered attack, the Outsiders would be better equipped to counter them.

Two Outsider scientists, Luz and Ian, landed on the surface to look for Movement technology and rescue as many locals as they could before the ondat began scouring the planet. They were amazed to discover a member of the original First Movement, the Ila, alive after hundreds of years, ruling and spreading her nanoceles. The Outsiders requested a century to study these nanoceles to see if they could be adapted to reverse contamination here and elsewhere; the ondat gave them 40 years. The events of Hammerfall followed, where Marak brought many of the locals, including the Ila and her records, to Luz's Refuge before the ondat's hammer fell.

Concord Station was constructed to orbit Marak's World where representatives from Earth, the Outsiders and the ondat monitored the planet's recovery and enforced the Treaty between the three parties, that no First Movement technology must leave the planet. Luz and Ian remained on Marak's World and released their own nanisms to eliminate the Ila's contaminants. With Marak, they monitored the planet's rehabilitation from the ground and fed data up to the station. The station in turn sent down to the still unstable planet invaluable weather reports.

== Plot summary ==
Forge of Heaven takes place several centuries after Hammerfall. The transformation of Marak's World is monitored on the ground by Marak, assisted by Luz and Ian, and planetary watchers on Concord Station using taps, nanocele implants that enable watchers and those on the planet to communicate with one another. Kekellen, the ondat's representative on the station, whom no one has ever seen, is particularly interested in Marak and his activities, and uses it to help understand humans. Procyon is Marak's watcher on Concord.

Unannounced, a ship from Earth arrives at the station and Earth ambassador Andreas Gide demands to interrogate Procyon about whether illegal First Movement technology is leaving the planet. Fearing Outsider contamination, Gide enters the station in a sealed mobile containment unit. Procyon assures Gide that, to his knowledge, no illicit technology is leaving the planet, but as the interview ends, Gide is shot at with an armor-piercing shell, which breaches his containment field. Gide is taken to hospital on the station, but because he has now been exposed to Outsider "contaminates", he is unable to return to the Earth ship. Procyon, concussed from the blast, wanders off and is soon lost in the station's corridors.

Procyon's disappearance causes problems for the Planetary Observations Office, which oversees communications with the world below. Marak, who has become dependent on Procyon, demands to know what has happened to his watcher. Kekellen, concerned about the disruption of the Planetary Observation Project, intervenes. Using station maintenance robots, he rescues Procyon, but implants a tap in him, enabling Kekellen to keep in touch with him.

It is revealed that Movement technology was leaked from the planet via the Ila's watcher on Concord and exported to Orb, a nearby station where sophisticated illicits were being manufactured. The Ila inadvertently kills her watcher when she attempts to hack Concord's tap system. With the help of the ondat, Movement operatives on Concord are neutralized and their conduit to Orb is severed.

Project operations on Concord resume and Procyon returns to work as Marak's tap. On the planet, geological upheavals have resulted in a new sea forming with new weather patterns and the promise of new life evolving. The ondat, via Procyon, are now closer to Marak's World and is able to watch the planet's rebirth first hand.

== Reception ==
Writing in SFRevu, author and academic Edward Carmien (editor of The Cherryh Odyssey) described Forge of Heaven as "immersive, imaginative, and compelling". He said Cherryh's switch from her intense third-person narrative in Hammerfall, which he said "can become oppressive", to this novel's multi-threaded narrative, has made it a "livelier" and more interesting read. In a review in Booklist, Paula Luedtke wrote that despite the novel's uneven pace, it should not be "underestimated". She said "it gathers momentum toward the stunning and unexpected ending that is realized with masterly aplomb".

A Publishers Weekly review described Forge of Heaven as a "suspenseful sequel to Hammerfall", and called Procyon "[a]mong the many nicely drawn characters" in the book. A reviewer in Kirkus Reviews called the "[i]ntrigue and strife" in Forge of Heaven a "desperately complicated setup" with a plot that is "going nowhere", but added that given the author's strength as a storyteller, "you almost don’t notice".

In The Cherryh Odyssey science fiction writer and literary critic John Clute described Hammerfall as "an epic, with prose rhythms that evoke the Bible", but added that he had not worked it out, and awaited "the New Testament", the sequel, which he hoped would be "something else". Clute said that while Forge of Heaven is not quite "the New Testament", it is "queerly and fascinatingly Asimovian" in so far as it is about "the conflict between change and stability", the backbone of Asimov's Foundation and Robot series.

== Sources ==
- Cherryh, C. J. (2004). Forge of Heaven (e-book ed.). New York City: HarperCollins. ISBN 978-0-0617-4390-0.
- Clute, John (2004). "A Great Deal in Sand: Hammerfall by C. J. Cherryh". In Carmien, Edward (ed.). The Cherryh Odyssey. Wildside Press LLC. pp. 90–95. ISBN 978-0-8095-1071-9.
