= Gliese 908 =

Star in the constellation Pisces

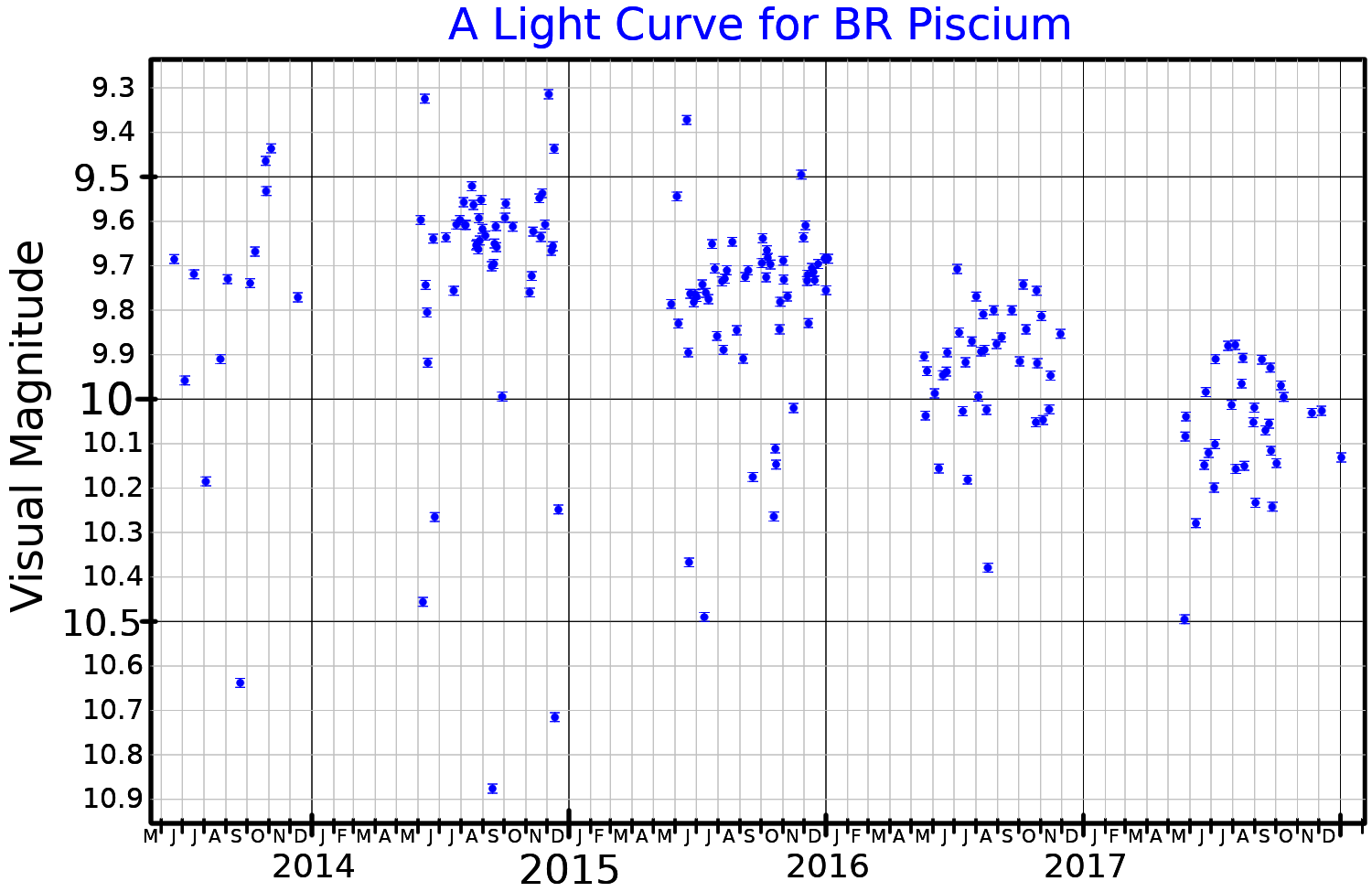
- A visual band light curve for BR Piscium, plotted from ASAS-SN data

Observation data Epoch J2000 Equinox ICRS
- Constellation: Pisces
- Right ascension: 23^{h} 49^{m} 12.52508^{s}
- Declination: 02° 24′ 04.4055″
- Apparent magnitude (V): 8.93 - 9.03

Characteristics
- Spectral type: M1V Fe-1
- Variable type: BY Dra

Astrometry
Radial velocity (R_{v})	−71.37±0.12 km/s
Proper motion (μ)	RA: +992.720 mas/yr Dec.: −968.806 mas/yr
Parallax (π)	169.2163±0.0281 mas
Distance	19.275 ± 0.003 ly (5.9096 ± 0.0010 pc)
Absolute magnitude (M_{V})	+10.1

Details
Mass	0.37 M_{☉}
Radius	0.409±0.023 R_{☉}
Luminosity (bolometric)	0.0253±0.0006 L_{☉}
Surface gravity (log g)	4.86 cgs
Temperature	3,600±100 K
Metallicity [Fe/H]	−0.51±0.05 dex
Rotation	50.83±0.35 days
Rotational velocity (v sin i)	2.25 km/s

Other designations
- BR Piscium, BD+01°4774, GJ 908, HIP 117473, SAO 128397, PPM 174453, G 29-68, G 31-6, LHS 550, LTT 17014, PLX 5763, TYC 586-610-1, GSC 00586-00610, IRAS 23466+0207, 2MASS J23491255+0224037, Lalande 46650

Database references
SIMBAD	data
- Location of Gliese 908 in the constellation Pisces

Gliese 908 is a red dwarf star, located in constellation Pisces at 19.3 light-years from Earth. It is a BY Draconis variable star with a variable star designation of BR Piscium. Its apparent magnitude varies between magnitude 8.93 and magnitude 9.03 as a result of starspots and varying chromospheric activity.

The variability of Gliese 908 was confirmed in 1994, although no period could be detected in its brightness changes. It was entered into the General Catalogue of Variable Stars in 1997.

Gliese 908 is a cool main sequence star, a red dwarf, with a spectral class of M1V Fe-1. The suffix indicates a noticeable deficiency in heavy elements.
