= Regenesis (novel) =

2009 science fiction novel by C. J. Cherryh

- DAW Books first edition cover, 2009
- Author: C. J. Cherryh
- Language: English
- Genre: Science fiction
- Publisher: DAW Books
- Publication date: January 2009
- Publication place: United States
- Media type: Print (Hardback)
- Pages: 592
- ISBN: 0-7564-0530-0
- OCLC: 233548909
- Preceded by: Cyteen

Regenesis (2009) is a science fiction novel by American writer C. J. Cherryh, set in her Alliance-Union universe. It is a sequel to Cherryh's Cyteen, and was published in hardcover by DAW Books in January 2009. The teenage clone of a top scientist and political leader unravels the decades-old murder of her "genemother", while also dealing with threats to her own welfare.

== Plot summary ==
Ariane Emory is the eighteen-year-old clone of an extraordinary woman who was both a preeminent research scientist and the leader of the Expansionist Party, which has controlled Union since its inception. Her predecessor had some very powerful friends and enemies. However, as her genemother had died under suspicious circumstances before she was even born, Emory is unsure who they are.

She is not without resources though. A breakthrough experiment in "psychogenesis" has recreated in her the genius of her parent. Everyone knows that she will one day follow in her mother's footsteps and take charge of Reseune, a sovereign Administrative Territory and the premier azi research facility in Union, one of the three spacefaring factions of humanity.

In the meantime, she takes measures to protect herself, assembling a trusted staff with the assistance of her azi bodyguards and companions, Florian and Catlin. When she discovers that her new azi security chief has been tampered with, her list of possible enemies grows to include key men inside Reseune itself: Yanni Schwartz, the Director, and Adam Hicks, the head of security. Adding to the discord is the return of a bitter Jordan Warrick from a twenty-year exile at an isolated research facility. He had been pressured into confessing to killing the original Emory.

The murder of Dr. Sandur Patil, a top scientist recruited by Schwartz to head up the terraforming of Eversnow, (Note: Eversnow is a frozen Union planet accessible from the Fargone space station.) turns out to be but one step in a plot by Emory's unknown enemy that shakes Union to its core. As she struggles to deal with the escalating situation, she also unravels the decades-old mystery of her genemother's death.

== Characters ==
- Ariane Emory – heir apparent to the directorship of Reseune; clone of Ariane Emory I
- Florian and Catlin – azi bodyguards to Emory
- Yanni Schwartz – Director of Reseune; Proxy Councillor of Science
- Jordan Warrick – a top Reseune tape designer; self-centered genius
- Justin Warrick – clone and son of Jordan Warrick; Ariane Emory's teacher and trusted member of her staff
- Grant – azi created by Emory I; grew up with Justin and is his lover; works with Justin for Emory
- Dr. Sandur Patil – the top scientist in the field of nanistics (biological nanomachines whose main application is terraforming)
- Adam Hicks – Security Director of Reseune
- Kyle AK36 – azi assistant to Hicks
- Amy Carnath, Maddy Strassen, Sam Whitely – close friends of Emory from childhood
- Mikhail Corain – Citizens' Councillor, moderate leader of the opposition Centrist Party
- Vladislaw Khalid – ambitious former Councillor of Defense
- Catherine Lao – Councillor of Information and supporter of Reseune

== Reception ==
In his Sci Fi Wire review, Paul Di Filippo complained that the "forward movement of the story is slow and halting". Nader Elhefnawy wrote in Strange Horizons that while Regenesis creates "a better sense of the fictional world" than Cyteen, he felt that it adds little to the concepts introduced in its predecessor. Elhefnawy added that he "had little feeling that something fundamental had been decided, a turning point passed in the evolution of either the book's main character, or the larger drama of her world and her civilization".
