= Hammerfall (novel) =

2001 novel by C. J. Cherryh

- Author: C. J. Cherryh
- Cover artist: Bob Eggleton
- Language: English
- Genre: Science fiction
- Publisher: HarperCollins
- Publication date: June 19, 2001
- Publication place: United States
- Pages: 390 (hardback)
- ISBN: 0-06-105260-4
- OCLC: 45023270
- Dewey Decimal: 813/.54 21
- LC Class: PS3553.H358 H35 2001
- Followed by: Forge of Heaven

Hammerfall is a science fiction novel by American science fiction and fantasy author C. J. Cherryh. It was first published in June 2001 in the United States by HarperCollins under its Eos Books imprint. It was also serialized in two parts as Ribelle Genetico and Il Pianeta del Deserto in the Italian science fiction magazine, Urania, published in issue 1425 in October 2001, and issue 1430 in January 2002, respectively.

Hammerfall is the first of two novels set in Cherryh's Gene Wars universe, and concerns gene manipulation using nanotechnology, and contact with an alien race, the ondat. The second novel, Forge of Heaven was published in June 2004.

Hammerfall was nominated for the John W. Campbell Memorial Award for Best Science Fiction Novel in 2002, and was a third-place runner-up.

== Plot summary ==
Hammerfall takes place on an unspecified planet, (Note: In the sequel, Forge of Heaven, Cherryh calls the planet "Marak's World", and provides a detailed backstory of the events leading to the human landings on the planet, their encounters with the ondat, and the Gene Wars.) where the Ila, believed to be a god and immortal, rules the Lakht, a huge desert, and all its villages from the holy city of Oburan. Some of the villagers, including Marak, an abjorian fighter of the Kais Tain tribe, are afflicted with a "madness" that manifests itself in the form of voices and visions, and are outcast from their communities. The Ila, however, is interested in the "mad" and orders that they be rounded up and brought across the desert to Oburan.

The Ila singles out Marak, because he and his father had launched an unsuccessful rebellion against her. She queries Marak on the nature of these visions and voices, and, intimidated by her holiness, he tells her they appear to come from the east where there is a silver tower he is drawn to. She instructs Marak to lead the other mad east across the desert to find the source of the madness, and promises that if he returns with the answer, she will make him ruler of Kais Tain. After several weeks in the harsh desert, the visions and voices draw Marak and the others to the silver tower where they meet Luz, who appears to be a deity like the Ila.

Luz explains to Marak that the "mad" have tiny "creatures" in their blood that makes them see and hear things. These are "makers", or nanoceles that they have infected them with, and it is Luz who has been calling them east. She tells Marak that when the Ila first arrived on the planet over 500 years ago, she used her own makers to modify man and beast to survive in the desert, but this angered the ondat, an alien species, because she had released makers on their world and damaged its ecology. The ondat feared her actions would rekindle the age-old Gene Wars, and want to rid the planet of all Ila's life. Luz's people negotiated with the ondat to give them time to undo the Ila's makers with their own more advanced nanoceles, and prevent the ondat from destroying the planet. Thirty years ago, Luz and her team landed and began releasing their own makers into villagers to draw them to her. The ondat agreed to hold off their destruction for thirty years, and to spare the area surrounding Luz's tower once it begins. Luz instructs Marak to return across the desert to Oburan and persuade the Ila and other survivors to come to Luz's Refuge where they will be safe. The thirty years is already up and Marak has to hurry because the ondat have already begun their bombardment of the Lakht with asteroids from space.

To stress the urgency of Marak's new mission, Luz feeds the "mad" with a new vision, that of the final ondat assault on the world, the hammerfall. Guided by Luz's voice, Marak manages to avoid the bombardment from space and reaches Oburan, only to finds it in ruins, and the Ila and other survivors camped nearby. Keeping to his promise, Marak tells her what he found, and about Luz and her makers. The Ila reveals that she knew about Luz, and while at odds with her, she agrees to return with Marak to her Refuge because she knows that the hammerfall is coming.

The return caravan with the Ila and other survivors barely makes it across the desert to the Refuge before the final hammer falls, destroying the Lakht. An uneasy truce is established between the Ila and Luz, the world's two "gods", and while the Ila insists that her makers will overcome Luz's, it is her makers that are overwhelmed by Luz's. The weather has changed—it is cold and often snows, but after several generations, Marak, whose makers have made him immortal, begins routine inspections of the transformed Lakht, and Luz prepares to release new creatures she has engineered.

== Reception ==
A review in Publishers Weekly praised Hammerfall, calling it a "satisfying novel" that is a "blend of gorgeous, slightly knotty prose, deeply conflicted heroes, desperate action and nicely observed cultural details". Writing in the SF Reader, Elizabeth Kelley Buzbee described the book as a "world-class space opera" that explores "the low tech/high tech clash of cultures". But she was critical of Cherryh's portrayal of the two major characters, Marak and the Ila, who she felt come across as being the perfect hero and villain. Buzbee said that neither of them appear to experience any internal conflict: one never doubts Makak's sanity, and the Ila is simply too opaque to understand.

A reviewer in Kirkus Reviews called Hammerfall "[v]ery disappointing", complaining that it has "no recognizable plot" and is a "threadbare scenario that's little more than elaborate stage-setting for the series to come". In the Science Fiction Weekly, science fiction writer and literary critic John Clute said the novel is "a most extraordinary text [that] is told with all the intensity of an epic", but found it "exhausti[ng]". He described the storyline, the endless treks back and forth across the desert, as "Idiot-Plot circumbendibus", adding that it "walks in its own bitter water".

A New England Science Fiction Association reviewer, Elisabeth Carey said that Hammerfall reads like a fantasy because it is written from Marak's perspective, a non-technological nomad, who probably interprets the technology he witnesses as magic. She found the book "interesting and mostly enjoyable", but added that it might be enjoyed more by fans of Cherryh's fantasy than her science fiction. Carey was, however, critical of Luz's characterization, complaining that she is "difficult and obscure", and that some of Marak's wrong decisions are because she is so obscure. Carey wrote: "This is dangerously close to being an idiot plot, a plot in which critical events would not happen, if otherwise intelligent characters did not behave like idiots".

== Sources ==
- Cherryh, C. J. (2001). Hammerfall (e-book ed.). New York City: HarperCollins. ISBN 978-0-0617-4483-9.
- Cherryh, C. J. (2004). Forge of Heaven (e-book ed.). New York City: HarperCollins. ISBN 978-0-0617-4390-0.
