= Downbelow Station =

1981 novel by C. J. Cherryh

- Cover of 1981 Book Club edition (hardcover)
- Author: C. J. Cherryh
- Language: English
- Series: Alliance–Union universe
- Genre: Military science fiction
- Published: 1981 (DAW Books)
- Publication place: United States
- Media type: Print (Hardback & Paperback)
- Pages: 438 pp
- Award: Hugo Award for Best Novel
- ISBN: 84-7002-376-4
- OCLC: 434070670
- Preceded by: Heavy Time, Hellburner
- Followed by: Merchanter's Luck

Downbelow Station is a science fiction novel by American writer C. J. Cherryh, published in 1981 by DAW Books. It won the Hugo Award in 1982, was shortlisted for a Locus Award that same year, and was named by Locus magazine as one of the top 50 science fiction novels of all time in 1987.

The book is set in Cherryh's Alliance–Union universe during the Company Wars period, specifically late 2352 and early 2353. The book details events centering on a space station in orbit around Pell's World (also known as "Downbelow") in the Tau Ceti star system. The station serves as the transit point for ships moving between the Earth and Union sectors of the galaxy.

The working title of the book was The Company War, but Cherryh's editor at DAW, Donald A. Wollheim, believed that the moniker lacked commercial appeal, so Downbelow Station was selected as the title for publication. It was the first novel edited by current DAW president Elizabeth Wollheim, who worked alongside her father.

== Plot ==
Space is explored not by short-sighted governments but by the Earth Company, a private corporation which becomes enormously wealthy and powerful as a result. Nine star systems are found to lack planets suitable for colonization, so space stations are built in orbit instead, stepping stones for further exploration. Then, Pell's World is found to be not only habitable, but already populated by the gentle, sentient (if technologically backward) Hisa. Pell Station is built. The planet is nicknamed "Downbelow" by the stationers, who also start to call their home "Downbelow Station".

When Earth's out-of-touch policies cause it to begin losing control of its more distant stations and worlds, it builds a fleet of fifty military carriers, the Earth Company Fleet, to enforce its will. This leads to the prolonged Company War with the breakaway Union, based at Cyteen, another habitable world. Caught in between are the stationers and the merchanters who crew the freighters that maintain interstellar trade.

Set in the final days of the war, Downbelow Station opens with Earth Company Captain Signy Mallory and her warship, Norway, escorting a ragtag fleet fleeing from Russell's and Mariner Stations to Pell. Similar convoys arrive from other stations destroyed or lost to Union, leading to an enormous crisis. The flood of unexpected refugees strains station resources. Angelo Konstantin, Stationmaster of Pell, and his two sons, Damon and Emilio, struggle to cope with the situation. Fearing Union infiltrators and saboteurs, Pell dumps all the refugees in a Quarantine Zone, causing massive dislocations of Pell's own citizens.

While conferring with Pell's administrators, Mallory encounters a delegation from the Earth Company, led by Segust Ayres, Second Secretary of Earth's Security Council. Offended by her brusque, arrogant manner, Ayres declines her offer of transportation to the front and charters a freighter instead. Unbeknownst to Mallory, Ayres' mission is to open peace negotiations with Union.

Mallory also drops off a Union prisoner of war, Josh Talley, whom she had rescued from a brutal interrogation by panicked security forces at Russell's. However, on the voyage to Pell, her sexual exploitation of him had been only marginally less abusive. Faced with indefinite confinement on Pell, Talley requests Adjustment, the wiping of much of his memory, in return for his freedom. When questioned by Damon Konstantin, he requests Adjustment to escape the indefinite imprisonment, so Konstantin reluctantly gives his permission. Upon later review of his file, Damon learns that Talley had already undergone the treatment once before at Russell's. Still feeling guilty for agreeing, he and his wife Elene Quen befriend the post-Adjustment Talley, an act of kindness that will have monumental, unforeseen consequences.

Jon Lukas, Angelo Konstantin's brother-in-law and only rival for power, is worried about the course of the war. The Fleet has received little or no support from an indifferent Earth and is gradually losing a war of attrition. He secretly contacts Union, offering to hand Pell over. Union responds by smuggling in a secret agent named Jessad.

The ten remaining Company Fleet vessels under Conrad Mazian are assembling for a major engagement. This operation follows a series of calculated strategic maneuvers. A successful strike on Viking Station could neutralize the enemy's numerical advantage, establishing a buffer zone between Earth and Union space that would increase the logistical difficulty of continued conflict.

Seb Azov, the Union military commander, has no choice but to gather his forces at Viking to await Mazian's anticipated attack. However, he has an ace up his sleeve. He has pressured Ayres into recording a message ordering Mazian to break off while peace is being negotiated. When Mazian strikes, Ayres' broadcast order does indeed force him to abort and the Fleet retreats to Pell in confusion.

Mazian meets with his captains and gives them the choice of accepting a peace treaty that essentially concedes victory to Union as per Ayres' broadcast or rebelling against Earth and continuing to fight that is his preference. They all remain loyal to their leader. One of Mazian's first acts is to place Pell under martial law.

The Fleet is now forced to defend Downbelow Station, its only reliable base and supply source. Union forces attack and destroy two ships out on patrol. While Union suffers casualties as well, it can replace its losses, unlike Mazian. Counting one carrier lost earlier in the debacle at Viking, he has just seven ships left.

Under cover of the panic on the station caused by the battle in space, Lukas makes his move, killing and supplanting his hated rival, Angelo Konstantin. To escape rioting refugees, Elene Quen is forced to board Finity's End, one of the most respected merchanter ships. The freighters flee the battle zone, but Quen convinces most of them to band together, for safety and to maximize their leverage whatever happens. Damon survives his uncle's assassination attempt and links up with Talley. Together, they manage to hide from Lukas; in fact, Talley discovers he is surprisingly good at it.

Eventually, they are contacted by Jessad, and Talley finds out why. He and Jessad are the same kind: azi, artificially bred and, in Jessad and Talley's case, trained especially for espionage and sabotage. They are discovered by Fleet marines; Jessad is killed, while Konstantin and Talley are captured and taken to Mallory.

She receives orders from Mazian to quietly dispose of Konstantin. Lukas does the Fleet's bidding with far fewer scruples, so Konstantin is superfluous, even dangerous. Mazian is preparing to disable and abandon Downbelow Station. He has another goal in mind: to take over Earth itself in a surprise coup d'etat. The wrecking of Pell would create a firebreak with Union, playing the role he had originally intended for Viking.

Mallory has different ideas. Mazian has gone too far for her to stomach. She abruptly undocks from Pell and deserts. Mallory finds the Union forces and persuades Azov to unleash them against her former comrades. Talley is instrumental in convincing Azov of Mallory's truthfulness.

Mazian cannot afford a costly fight, so the Fleet sets off for Earth prematurely. Azov needs to pursue him, but is unwilling to leave Norway intact behind him. The tense standoff is broken by a timely arrival; Quen returns with the united merchanter fleet and claims Pell for the newborn Merchanter's Alliance, with Norway as its militia. Without the authority to deal with this new development and unwilling to fight the merchanters, Azov leaves to deal with Mazian.

The end of the Company War is at last in sight, much to the relief of the Konstantins, the merchanters, and the residents of Downbelow Station.

== Characters ==
- Earth Company personnel
  - Signy Mallory, female, captain of the Earth Company Ship ECS5 Norway and the third most senior captain in the Earth Company Fleet
  - Conrad Mazian, male, flamboyant, brilliant commander of the Earth Company Fleet
  - Segust Ayres, male, Second Secretary of the Earth Company Security Council
- Pell stationers
  - Angelo Konstantin, male, Stationmaster of Pell Station, husband of Alicia Lukas Konstantin
  - Alicia Lukas Konstantin, married to Angelo Konstantin, sister of Jon Lukas, bedridden and dependent on technology for survival
  - Damon Konstantin, son of Angelo and Alicia; head of Legal Affairs
  - Elene Quen, female, a former merchanter, married to Damon Konstantin
  - Emilio Konstantin, son of Angelo and Alicia
  - Jon Lukas, male, head of the Lukas family, rivals of the Konstantins
- Union personnel
  - Joshua Talley, male, a prisoner of war who ends up at Pell
  - Jessad, male, a secret agent
  - Seb Azov, male, Union military commander
- Hisa (natives of Pell, also known as 'Downers')
  - Satin, female, mate of Bluetooth, asks for work assignment on Pell Station
  - Bluetooth, male, follows Satin to Pell Station
  - Lily, female, attendant to Alicia Konstantin
- Others
  - Vassily Kressich, male, refugee from Mariner Station

== The Company War board game ==
The Company War is a board game based on Downbelow Station. It was published by Mayfair Games in 1983.

== Reception ==
Dave Langford reviewed Downbelow Station for White Dwarf #45, and stated that "Cherryh can do better than this-though others have done it far worse."

=== Awards ===
- 1982: Hugo Award for Best Novel: winner
- 1982: Locus Award for Best Science Fiction Novel: shortlist nominee
- 1987: Locus Award, All-Time Best SF Novel: position 41
- 1998: Locus Award, All-Time Best SF Novel before 1990: position 25

== Song ==
The filk song "Signy Mallory" by Mercedes Lackey and Leslie Fish won the 2005 Pegasus Award for Best Space Opera Song.

== Publication information ==
- (United States) : C.J. Cherryh (1981). Downbelow Station. Daw Books. ISBN 0-87997-594-6.
- (United Kingdom) : C.J. Cherryh (1981). Downbelow Station. Severn House. ISBN 0-7278-1073-1. UK hardcover edition
- (Italy) Italian: C.J. Cherryh (1982). La Lega dei Mondi Ribelli. Ed. Libra. ISBN 88-200-0211-6. 1st Italian edition
- (United Kingdom) : C.J. Cherryh (1983). Downbelow Station. Methuen. ISBN 0-413-51310-6. UK paperback edition
- (France) French: C.J. Cherryh (1985). Forteresse des Etoiles. Opta. ISBN 978-2-7201-0244-8.
- (Japan) Japanese: C.J. Cherryh (1985). ダウンビロウ・ステーション. Hayakawa Publishing. ISBN 978-4150105990.
- (Spain) Spanish: C.J. Cherryh (1985). La Estación Downbelow. Editorial Acervo. ISBN 84-7002-376-4. 1st Spanish edition
- (Hungary) Hungarian: C.J. Cherryh (1988). Mélyállomás. Maecenas Könyvkiadó. ISBN 963-02-5792-0.
- (Italy) Italian: C.J. Cherryh (1988). La Lega dei Mondi Ribelli. Editrice Nord. ISBN 88-429-0389-2. 2nd Italian edition
- (Germany) German: C.J. Cherryh (1989). Pells Stern. Heyne Verlag. ISBN 3-453-30980-4. German edition
- (Czech Republic) Czech: C.J. Cherryh (1992). Stanice Pell. Winston Smith. ISBN 80-85643-02-2. Czech edition
- (Poland) Polish: C.J. Cherryh (1993). Stacja Podspodzie. Wydawnictwa Alfa. ISBN 83-88431-21-8. Polish edition
- (Russia) Russian: C.J. Cherryh (1995). Последняя база. Alex Korzhenevski. Russian edition
- (Romania) Romanian: C.J. Cherryh (1997). Staţia orbitală a lumii de jos. Editura Pygmalion. Rumanian edition
- (United States) : C.J. Cherryh (2001). Downbelow Station (20th anniversary ed.). Daw Books. ISBN 0-7564-0059-7.
- (South Korea) Korean: C.J. Cherryh (2018). 다운빌로 스테이션. Open Books. Korean edition (Published in two volumes)

== See also ==
- Mazianni
