= The Dreamstone (novel) =

1983 novel by C. J. Cherryh

- First edition cover
- Author: C. J. Cherryh
- Cover artist: David A. Cherry
- Language: English
- Series: Ealdwood Stories
- Genre: Fantasy
- Publisher: DAW Books
- Publication date: March 1983
- Publication place: United States
- Media type: Print (paperback)
- Pages: 192
- ISBN: 0-87997-808-2
- Followed by: The Tree of Swords and Jewels

The Dreamstone is a 1983 fantasy novel by American writer C. J. Cherryh. It includes revisions of the author's 1979 short story "The Dreamstone" (Amazons!, ed. Jessica Amanda Salmonson) and her 1981 novella Ealdwood, plus additional material. The book is the first of two novels in Cherryh's Ealdwood Stories series, the second being The Tree of Swords and Jewels. The series draws on Celtic mythology and is about Ealdwood, a forest at the edge of Faery, and Arafel, a Daoine Sidhe.

The Dreamstone was first published in 1983 as a paperback edition by DAW Books, and featured cover art by Cherryh's brother, David A. Cherry. The Dreamstone and The Tree of Swords and Jewels were later republished in three omnibuses:

- Arafel's Saga (1983, DAW Books)
- Ealdwood (1991, Victor Gollancz) – includes revisions and a new ending
- The Dreaming Tree (1997, DAW Books) – includes the revisions and new ending of Ealdwood (1991)

== Plot summary ==
The Dreamstone begins in a forest called Ealdwood, the last remaining bastion of Faery on Earth. Once, the Sidhe had roamed the world freely, but when Man came and fought wars and spread evil, the dark Sidhe burrowed deep or hid in rivers and lakes, while the bright ones, the Daoine Sidhe left mortal Earth and returned to Faery. But one bright one, Arafel chose to remain behind and guard Ealdwood, the last untouched forest. Men avoided Ealdwood because those who ventured in never came out again.

Arafel watched the coming and going of Men in the lands surrounding Ealdwood, but showed little interest in them, until one man sought shelter in the fringes of the forest. She confronted him and learned that his king at Dun na h-Eoin had been killed, and that he, Niall, was on the run from those who had seized power. Arafel tells him that he cannot stay in Ealdwood, but fearing for his safety, sends him to Beorc's Steading, a sanctuary hidden in a valley for "lostlings".

Back in Ealdwood, another man stumbles into the forest. Arafel learns he is Fionn, the dead king's harper, fleeing Lord Evald of Caer Wiell. Evald had overthrown the king, taken his wife, Meara, and now claims Fionn's harp as his own. When Evald invades the forest in pursuit of Fionn, Arafel denies him access to the harper. Evald demands compensation for what he claims is his, and she gives him her dreamstone, a magical stone that preserves memories of the wearer. Evald returns to Caer Wiell and Arafel allows Fionn to stay in Ealdwood so she can listen to him sing. But the dreamstone Evald now wears causes both him and Arafel anguish: she can feel his ugly memories and evil, while he can feel her kindness and peace, which confuses him. When Fionn discovers what Arafel did, and the distress it is causing her, he leaves her to find Evald to trade his harp for her stone. Evald, driven mad by lust and kindness, invades Ealdwood again and meets Fionn. He gives Fionn the stone for the harp, but kills the harper out of spite. Arafel arrives too late to save Fionn and kills Evald with her silver sword. Devastated, Arafel recovers her dreamstone and retreats to Eald (Faery).

When Niall learns of Lord Evald's death, he returns to Caer Wiell and seizes control. He offers Meara and her son by Evald, Evald junior, safety, and peace returns to Caer Wiell. Evald grows up and marries Meredydd, and when an aging Niall dies, Evald becomes Lord of Caer Wiell. A new king, Laochailan ascends to the throne, and is at war with An Beag. Lord Evald of Caer Wiell and brothers Donnchadh and Ciaran of Caer Donn agree to help the king reclaim control of Dun na h-Eoin. They win the battle, but Evald is worried that the retreating enemy will overrun Caer Wiell, and asks the king to let him return to defend it. The king refuses, but allows Ciaran to go. On his way to Caer Wiell, Ciaran is attacked at the edge of Ealdwood and flees into the forest. There he finds a tree with swords and jewels hanging from its branches. He takes one of the silver swords to defend himself, but Arafel intervenes and withdraws Ciaran into Eald. She realises that he is a halfling, a Man with elf blood in him, because no Man would find Cinniuint, the Tree of Swords and Jewels. Arafel explains to Ciaran that when the Daoine Sidhe withdrew to Faery they hung their swords and memory stones on the tree, and the sword he took belonged to an elf prince named Liosliath. She gives Ciaran Liosliath's jewel stone, similar to Arafel's dreamstone.

Ciaran tells Arafel he must honor his commitment to help Caer Wiell, and she takes him, via Faery, to the keep. Caer Wiell is besieged by An Beag, and Ciaran helps in its defence, assuring its people that their Lord Evald and the king will return to free them. As Caer Wiell's siege worsens, Ciaran calls Arafel for help via the stone, unaware of the dangers in summoning the Sidhe. Arafel reluctantly responds, knowing that she will wake the Sidhe's ancient enemies. She arms Ciaran and gives him an elf horse, and together they battle An Beag and ancient creatures who have aligned with the enemy. By the time the king and Lord Evald return, the battle is over, the dark forces are defeated and Arafel, free again after completing her task, has returned to Eald.

Everyone now sees Ciaran as an elf prince and fear him. The king returns to Dun na h-Eoin and Donnchadh to Caer Donn, both refusing to associate with Ciaran. Only Branwyn, Evald's daughter, accepts him, and Ciaran takes her to Ealdwood. He returns Liosliath's dreamstone to Arafel and the Sidhe blesses them both and Caer Wiell.

== Reception ==
In a review of The Dreaming Tree omnibus on the SF Site, Stephen Davis said that he found Cherryh's writing "first-rate", and that "the dialogue never feels stilted or corny; the characters are believable and have understandable motives; and Ms. Cherryh never overworks her scenes." The Rambles cultural arts magazine described the Arafel's Saga omnibus as "an epic tale of magic and adventure" and recommended it to anyone interested in legendary Fair Folk.

== Award nominations ==
- 1984 Locus Awards for Best Fantasy Novel.

== Cited works ==
- Cherryh, C. J. (1983). The Dreamstone. DAW Books. ISBN 0-87997-808-2.
- Cherryh, C. J. (1997). The Dreaming Tree. DAW Books. ISBN 0-88677-782-8.
