= Ealdwood =

1981 novella by C. J. Cherryh

- Dust-jacket from the first edition
- Author: C. J. Cherryh
- Illustrator: David A. Cherry
- Cover artist: David A. Cherry
- Language: English
- Series: Ealdwood Stories
- Genre: Fantasy
- Published: 1981 (Donald M. Grant)
- Publication place: United States
- Media type: Print (hardback)
- Pages: 142
- OCLC: 8667096

"Ealdwood" is a fantasy novella by American writer C. J. Cherryh. One of Cherryh's Ealdwood Stories, it was first published in 1981 by Donald M. Grant in a limited edition of 1,050 copies. The edition was illustrated by the author's brother, David A. Cherry. The novella draws on Celtic mythology and is about Ealdwood, a forest at the edge of Faery, and Arafel, a Daoine Sidhe.

"Ealdwood" and the author's 1979 short story "The Dreamstone" (published in Amazons!, edited by Jessica Amanda Salmonson) were combined and revised by Cherryh and published as a novel, The Dreamstone in 1983. Cherryh published a sequel to The Dreamstone later in 1983, The Tree of Swords and Jewels.

== Award nominations ==
- 1982 World Fantasy Award, Novella
- 1982 Locus Award, Novella

== Sources ==
- "1982 Locus Awards". The Locus Index to SF Awards. Archived from the original on May 17, 2008.
- "1982 World Fantasy Award Winners and Nominees". World Fantasy Convention. Archived from the original on May 9, 2008.
- Chalker, Jack L.; Owings, Mark (1998). The Science-Fantasy Publishers: A Bibliographic History, 1923-1998. Westminster, MD and Baltimore: Mirage Press, Ltd. p. 327.
- Clute, John; Grant, John (1997). The Encyclopedia of Fantasy. New York: St. Martin's Press. p. 180. ISBN 0-88184-708-9.
- Frane, J. (July 1981). "Review of Ealdwood". Locus. 14 (6): 11.
