= Dossouye =

2008 novel by Charles R. Saunders

- Cover of Dossouye 2008 Sword and Soul Media
- Author: Charles R. Saunders
- Cover artist: Mshindo Kumba
- Language: English
- Series: Dossouye
- Genre: Fantasy
- Published: 2008 Sword and Soul Media
- Publication place: United States
- Media type: Print (Paperback)
- Pages: 193 pp
- Preceded by: none
- Followed by: Dossouye: The Dancers of Mulukau

Dossouye is a sword and sorcery novel by American writer Charles R. Saunders, and published independently in 2008 by Sword & Soul Media via the online press Lulu. In 2012, Saunders published a sequel Dossouye: The Dancers of Mulukau.

== Background ==
Dossouye is a fix-up novel created of the short stories "Agbewe's Sword", "Gimmile's Songs", "Shiminege’s Mask", "Marwe’s Forest", and "Obenga’s Drum", the last previously unpublished. Dossouye herself is a woman warrior inspired by the real-life female warriors of the West African Kingdom of Dahomey. Her first stories appeared in Jessica Amanda Salmonson's Amazons! and Marion Zimmer Bradley's Sword and Sorceress, two anthologies designed to increase the number and recognition of female heroes in sword and sorcery fiction. Agbewe's Sword was adapted by Saunders himself in the screenplay of the film Amazons (1986).

== Synopsis ==
Orphaned at a young age, Dossouye becomes a soldier in the women’s army of the kingdom of Abomey. In a war against the rival kingdom of Abanti, Dossouye saves her people from certain destruction; but a cruel twist of fate compels her to go into exile.

Mounted on her war-bull, Gbo, Dossouye enters the vast rainforest beyond the borders of her homeland in search of a place to call her own.

The forest awaits Dossouye, a place where she may uncover a new purpose—or where the countless dangers that lurk could cut her journey tragically short.

== Setting ==
An alternate Africa like continent which goes unnamed throughout the novel

== List of characters ==
The characters in this section are listed in their order of appearance.

- Dossouye – a former member of the women's army of Abomey who goes into self-imposed exile to protect the beliefs of her people
- Gimmile – a song teller cursed by Legba who Dossouye encounters
- Marwe – a shapechanger, a spirit of the forest that Dossouye encounters
