= List of pessimistic literature =

List of works of literature that have expressed themes closely related to philosophical pessimism.

== List ==
Image	Name	Author	Date of publication
	Notes from Underground	Fyodor Dostoevsky	1864
—	"The Ones Who Walk Away from Omelas"	Ursula K. Le Guin	1973
	Small Moral Works	Giacomo Leopardi	1898
—	The Conspiracy Against the Human Race	Thomas Ligotti	2010
—	Blood Meridian	Cormac McCarthy	1985
	The Road	Cormac McCarthy	2006
	The Book of Disquiet	Fernando Pessoa	1982
—	Infinite Resignation	Eugene Thacker	2018
—	The City of Dreadful Night	James "B.V." Thomson	1874
—	The Schopenhauer Cure	Irvin D. Yalom	2005
	Candide	Voltaire	1759
—	Endgame	Samuel Beckett	1957
—	"Lazarus"	Leonid Andreyev	1906
—	No Longer Human	Osamu Dazai	1948
	The Sorrows of Young Werther	Johann Wolfgang von Goethe	1774
	The History of Rasselas, Prince of Abissinia	Samuel Johnson	1759
—	Confession	Leo Tolstoy	1882
	Journey to the End of the Night	Louis-Ferdinand Céline	1932
—	The Unbearable Heaviness of Being	Carroll Wainwright	2023
—	The Fall	Albert Camus	1956
	Kaddish for an Unborn Child	Imre Kertész	1990
—	Kappa	Ryunosuke Akutagawa	1927
	El Criticón	Baltasar Gracián	1651
