= Leonardo Rodríguez Solís =

Argentine film cinematographer

Leonardo Rodríguez Solís is an Argentine film cinematographer. He has also been credited as: Leonardo Solis, Leonard Solis, and Leandro Rodríguez Solís.

Some of his films have been critically well received: Funny Dirty Little War (1983) and Night of the Pencils (1986).

== Filmography (partial) ==
- Brigada en acción (1977)
- My Family's Beautiful! (1980)
- Deathstalker (1983)
- No habrá más penas ni olvido (1983) a.k.a. Funny Dirty Little War
- The Warrior and the Sorceress (1984)
- Vengeance of a Soldier (1984) a.k.a. Soldier's Revenge
- Wizards of the Lost Kingdom (1985)
- Las Barras bravas (1985)
- Mingo y Aníbal contra los fantasmas (1985)
- La Noche de los lápices (1986) a.k.a. Night of the Pencils
- Las Aventuras de Tremendo (1986)
- Amazons (1986)
- El Año del conejo (1987)
- Deathstalker II (1987) a.k.a. Deathstalker II: Duel of the Titans
- Stormquest (1987)
- Jailbird Rock (1988) a.k.a. Prison Dancer
- Two to Tango (1988) a.k.a. Matar es morir un poco

== Television (partial) ==
- Dagli Appennini alle Ande (1990) (Mini TV Series) a.k.a. De los Apeninos a los Andes
