= Heroic Visions II =

- Cover of the first edition.
- Editor: Jessica Amanda Salmonson
- Cover artist: Stephen Hickman
- Language: English
- Genre: Fantasy
- Publisher: Ace Books
- Publication date: 1986
- Publication place: United States
- Media type: Print (Paperback)
- Pages: 206
- ISBN: 0-441-32821-0
- Preceded by: Heroic Visions

Heroic Visions is an anthology of fantasy stories, edited by Jessica Amanda Salmonson. It was first published in paperback by Ace Books in July 1986.

The book collects thirteen new short stories and novelettes by various fantasy authors, with an introduction by Salmonson.

== Contents ==
- "Masterpieces of Heroic Fantasy: An Introduction" (Jessica Amanda Salmonson)
- "The Inn at the World's End" (Keith Roberts)
- "Voices" (Michael Bishop)
- "Lazarus" (Ellen Kushner)
- "La Strega" (Richard A. Russo)
- "Honor" (Jody Scott)
- "The Lingering Minstrel" (Jessica Amanda Salmonson)
- "The Head of Shemesh the Eshurian" (Avram Davidson)
- "The Lion of Elirhom's Anger" (Michael Nicholas Richard)
- "Eammon's Banshee" (Gillian Fitzgerald)
- "The Slaughter of the Gods" (Manly Wade Wellman)
- "Cohen the Clam-Killer" (Steven Bryan Bieler)
- "The Word-Woman of Dza" (Grania Davis)
- "Masquerade of a Dead Sword" (Thomas Ligotti)
