= Janrae Frank =

American novelist

- Born: October 1954
- Died: January 12, 2014
- Occupations: Journalist; author; editor
- Writing career
- Genres: Science fiction, fantasy

Janrae Frank was an American journalist, writer and editor known primarily for her work in science fiction and fantasy. She wrote extensively on the subject of women and feminism in speculative fiction.

== Life and career ==
Her first published short story, Wolves of Nakesht, appeared in the 1980 World Fantasy Award-winning anthology Amazons! (edited by Jessica Amanda Salmonson). This story introduced her most famous character, Chimquar the Lionhawk, and featured what are arguably her central themes: gender ambiguity and women of martial puissance. Other contributions in this field include Women Warriors and Earth Mothers and New Eves: Science Fiction About the Extraordinary Women of Today and Tomorrow, an anthology of stories which traced the contributions and history of women in science fiction from the 1920s on, decade by decade. This anthology has been used in many women's study courses on science fiction.

Her film journalism has been published in the cult magazine Cinefantastique as well as Movieline.

Lately, she was better known for dark fantasy series such as the Dark Brothers of the Light and the Journey of the Sacred King quartet.

== Published works ==
=== Writer ===
==== Chimquar the Lionhawk ====
- Wolves of Nakesht, published in Amazons! (DAW, 1979)
- In the Darkness, Hunting (paperback) (Wildside Press, 2004)
- In the Darkness, Hunting: Tales of Chimquar the Lionhawk (Renaissance Ebooks, 2005)

==== Dark Brothers of the Light series ====
- Blood Rites (Renaissance Ebooks, 2005)
- Blood Heresy (Renaissance Ebooks, 2005)
- Blood Dawn (Renaissance Ebooks, 2005)
- Blood Wraiths (Renaissance Ebooks, 2005)
- Blood Paladin (Renaissance Ebooks, 2005)
- Blood Arcane (Renaissance Ebooks, 2006)
- Blood Harvest (Renaissance Ebooks, 2006)
- Blood Hope (Renaissance Ebooks, 2008)
- Blood Lies (Smashwords, 2011)
- Blood Journey (forthcoming)

==== Journey of the Sacred King series ====
- My Sister's Keeper (Renaissance Ebooks, 2005)
- Sins of the Mother (Renaissance Ebooks, 2005)
- My Father's House (Renaissance Ebooks, 2006)
- Children of Wrath (Renaissance Ebooks, 2006)

==== Lycan Blood series ====
- Serpent's Quest (Renaissance eBooks, 2006)
- Fireborn Law (Renaissance eBooks, 2007)
- If Truth Dies (Renaissance eBooks, 2007)
- Kynyr's War (Renaissance eBooks, 2007)
- The Exile's Return (Renaissance eBooks, 2007)
- Kady's Vengeance (Renaissance eBooks, 2008)
- The Shadowed Princes (Renaissance eBooks, 2009)

==== Short fiction ====
- Visiting the Neighbors (I, Vampire: Interviews with the Undead, 1994)
- The Tale That Launched a Thousand Ships (Greatest Uncommon Denominator Magazine, 2007)

==== Essays ====
- Sex, Swords, and Superstition: A Close Look at Phyllis Ann Karr's Thorn and Frostflower (Thrust, 1985)
- A Funny Thing Happened on the Way to This Review (Thrust, 1986)
- Dead in Suburbia, or Whatever Happened to Feminism in SF? (Thrust, 1987)

=== Editor ===
- (with Jean Marie Stine and Forrest J Ackerman) New Eves: Science Fiction About the Extraordinary Women of Today and Tomorrow (Longmeadow Press, 1994)
