= Arafel =

Arafel may refer to:

- Arafel, a Hebrew word (ערפל), meaning "fog;" generally used in reference to the Apocalypse
- Arafel, a fictional nation in Robert Jordan's Wheel of Time fantasy books
- Arafel (Cherryh), a Siddhe fairy in C. J. Cherryh's Ealdwood fantasy stories
- Arafel, A Folk Black Metal band from Tel Aviv, Israel
- Arafel (Dune), the prophesied destruction of mankind in Frank Herbert's Dune universe
