= Ealdwood Stories =

Fantasy novel series by C. J. Cherryh

- Dreaming Tree omnibus
- "The Dreamstone" (1979); Ealdwood (1981); The Dreamstone (1983); The Tree of Swords and Jewels (1983)
- Author: C. J. Cherryh
- Country: United States
- Language: English
- Genre: Fantasy
- Publisher: Victor Gollancz, DAW Books
- Published: 1981–1983

The Ealdwood Stories, also known as the Arafel Stories, are a collection of fantasy works by American writer C. J. Cherryh. The books are works of high fantasy based in part on Celtic mythology. Arafel, a main character, is a Daoine Sidhe, the highest of the Sidhe faery-folk. She dwells in the magical small forest of Ealdwood, from which the tales take their name.

== Works ==
- "The Dreamstone" (1979) – short story first published in Amazons! (DAW), edited by Jessica Amanda Salmonson
- Ealdwood (1981, Victor Gollancz) – novella
- The Dreamstone (1983, DAW) – novel, included revisions of "The Dreamstone" (1979) and Ealdwood (1981), plus additional material
- The Tree of Swords and Jewels (1983, DAW) – novel, sequel to The Dreamstone (1983)

== Omnibuses ==
The Dreamstone (1983) and The Tree of Swords and Jewels (1983) have been republished in several omnibuses, some with substantial revisions. Cherryh also wrote a new ending which she felt was more appropriate and satisfying than her previous efforts.

- Arafel's Saga (1983, DAW)
- Ealdwood (1991, Victor Gollancz) – includes revisions and a new ending
- The Dreaming Tree (1997, DAW) – includes the revisions and new ending in the Ealdwood (1991) omnibus

"The Dreamstone" short story was later reprinted in The Collected Short Fiction of C. J. Cherryh (2004).

== Award nominations ==
Awards for the Ealdwood Stories
Year	Title	Award	Result	Ref.
1982	Ealdwood	World Fantasy Award—Novella	Finalist	
1982	Ealdwood	Locus Award for Best Novella	Finalist	
1984	Arafel's Saga	Science Fiction Book Club	selection	
1984	The Dreamstone	Locus Award for Best Fantasy Novel	Finalist	
1984	The Tree of Swords and Jewels	Locus Award for Best Fantasy Novel	Finalist	

== Works ==
- Cherryh, C. J. "The Dreamstone", in Amazons!, Jessica Amanda Salmonson ed., 1979.
- Cherryh, C. J. Ealdwood, Donald M. Grant, 1981.
- Cherryh, C. J. The Dreamstone, DAW Books, 1983.
- Cherryh, C. J. The Tree of Swords and Jewels, DAW Books, 1983.
- Cherryh, C. J. Arafel's Saga, omnibus, Nelson Doubleday / Science Fiction Book Club, 1983.
- Cherryh, C. J. Ealdwood, omnibus, Victor Gollancz, 1991, ISBN 0-575-04575-2.
- Cherryh, C. J. The Dreaming Tree, omnibus, DAW Books, 1997.
