= Charles R. Saunders =

American writer (1946–2020)

- Born: Charles Robert Saunders; July 12, 1946; Elizabeth, Pennsylvania, U.S.
- Died: May 2020; Dartmouth, Nova Scotia, Canada
- Education: Lincoln University
- Occupations: Short-story writer; novelist; essayist; editor
- Writing career
- Period: 1974–2020
- Genres: Fantasy, sword and sorcery
- Notable work: Imaro
- Website: differentdrumming.com

Charles Robert Saunders (July 12, 1946 – May 2020) was an American-born, Black Canadian author and journalist, a pioneer of the "sword and soul" literary genre with his Imaro novels. Saunders, who was born in Pennsylvania, moved to Canada to avoid the draft. He lived initially in Ontario before moving to Nova Scotia where he worked as a civil servant and teacher. In 1989, he started writing a column on Black issues for the Halifax Daily News.

During his long career, he wrote novels, non-fiction, screenplays and radio plays. Notably, he created a fictional continent Nyumbani, where the stories of Imaro, his sword and sorcery series, take place. In 2008, Night Shade Books re-published the second novel in an updated Imaro trilogy The Quest for Cush. In 2017, Saunders released "Nyumbani Tales". In 2018, he published a story of Imaro in the anthology The Mighty Warriors, edited by Robert M. Price.

== Biography ==
Charles Robert Saunders was born on July 3, 1946, in Elizabeth, Pennsylvania, a small town outside Pittsburgh. He later lived in Norristown before going to Lincoln University, from which he graduated in 1968 with a degree in psychology. Drafted to fight in Vietnam in 1969, he instead moved to Canada, living in Toronto and Hamilton, Ontario before a sojourn in Ottawa of fourteen or fifteen years. In 1985, Saunders moved to Nova Scotia, where he lived for the remainder of his life.

Saunders worked as a civil servant and teacher until 1989, when he began a career in journalism. Poet George Elliott Clarke, who had written a column on Black issues for the Halifax Daily News before moving to Ontario, recommended him to editor Doug MacKay, who after meeting Saunders took a chance and hired him. Nova Scotia's Black community is largely descended from African Americans who went over to the British side during the American Revolutionary War and the War of 1812; they were given freedom and land in Nova Scotia after those wars ended, and created communities such as Africville.

Saunders worked the night shift as a copy editor as well as writing his own weekly column on African-Nova Scotian life, for which he wrote his thoughts out in longhand during the day. He often wrote the paper's unsigned editorials. He also wrote four non-fiction books about the Nova Scotia Black community, including a collection of his columns, and contributed to The Spirit of Africville (1992), "a landmark book on the destroyed community."

When the Daily News shut down in 2008, Saunders retired. Afterwards, he became increasingly isolated. In his last years, he lived with little money in a modest apartment on Primrose Street in Dartmouth without a landline, mobile phone, or internet connection. He communicated weekly with friends and colleagues using the computers in his local library. Despite being in failing health in the final years of his life, Saunders confided to few about his condition. He died in May 2020, but his death was made public only in September.

Daily News colleagues praising Saunders's journalism include Doug MacKay, Bill Turpin, and Michael de Adder. Authors remembering him as an inspiration or mentor include Troy Wiggins, publisher of FIYAH, Milton Davis, operator of MVmedia and co-editor with Saunders of Griots: A Sword and Soul Anthology, Taaq Kirksey, developer of a television project based on Imaro.

== Literary career ==
According to Saunders, he read his first work of science fiction in 1958, a misremembered novel by Andre Norton, and stated that got him into the genre. (The mutated Siamese that he recalled in an interview with Amy Harlib was most likely Lura, the giant Siamese cat and companion to the hero Fors in Norton's 1952 novel Star Man's Son [later reprinted as Daybreak 2250 A.D. and Star Man's Son – 2250 A.D.].)

Inspired by Africa, he created the fictional continent Nyumbani (which means "home" in Swahili), where the stories of Imaro, his sword and sorcery series, take place. In 1974, Saunders wrote a series of short stories for Gene Day's science fiction fanzine Dark Fantasy. The issue of Dark Fantasy with the first Imaro story found its way to Lin Carter, who included it in his first Year's Best Fantasy Stories collection, published by DAW Books in 1975. The publication brought Saunders' work to the attention of Daw publisher Donald A. Wollheim, who eventually suggested that Saunders turn his Imaro stories into a novel. Six of the novellas that were originally published by Gene Day in Dark Fantasy ("Mawanzo", "Turkhana Knives", "The Place of Stones", "Slaves of the Giant Kings", "Horror in the Black Hills", and "The City of Madness") would later be used in his first novel, Imaro, which was published by Daw in 1981.

However, a lawsuit by the Edgar Rice Burroughs estate over a poorly-chosen cover quote, The Epic Novel of a Black Tarzan, caused a one-month delay in shipping, as the books had to be reprinted, which led to poor sales. Saunders wrote and sold two more books in the series: The Quest for Cush (1984) and The Trail of Bohu (1985).

In 2000, author and editor Sheree Renée Thomas (Sheree R. Thomas) published Saunders' original short story, "Gimmile's Songs" in Dark Matter: A Century of Speculative Fiction from the African Diaspora published by Warner Aspect, as well as his original essay, "Why Blacks Should Read (and Write) Science Fiction". This publication reintroduced Saunders' work to a new generation of readers. In 2004, Thomas published his original short story, "Yahimba's Choice" in Dark Matter: Reading the Bones published by Warner Aspect.

In 2006, small press Night Shade Books made a deal with Saunders to publish an updated edition of Imaro. This new edition excludes the novella "Slaves of the Giant-Kings", which Saunders felt held too many parallels to the present day Rwandan genocide. In 2008 the second novel in the updated Imaro trilogy The Quest for Cush was published by Night Shade Books, and the company has decided not to publish any other Imaro novels at this time.

In 2008, Saunders released the related work Dossouye through Sword & Soul Media and the online publisher Lulu, Dossouye is a fix-up novel created from the short stories "Agbewe's Sword", "Gimmile's Songs", "Shiminege’s Mask", "Marwe’s Forest", and "Obenga’s Drum", the last previously unpublished. Dossouye herself is a woman warrior inspired by the real-life female warriors of the West African Kingdom of Dahomey. Her first stories appeared in Jessica Amanda Salmonson's Amazons! and Marion Zimmer Bradley's Sword and Sorceress, two anthologies designed to increase the number and recognition of female heroes in sword and sorcery fiction. "Agbewe's Sword" was adapted by Saunders himself in the screenplay of the film Amazons (1986). In 2009 he released The Trail of Bohu, the third title in the now ongoing Imaro series, through the Sword & Soul Media storefront. In 2009 he released The Naama War the fourth and latest Imaro novel through Lulu. In 2012, he released Dossouye: The Dancers of Mulukau, the second novel of Dossouye.

In 2017, Saunders released "Nyumbani Tales", a collection of Nyumbani stories that had not yet been republished, among them "Katisa," about Imaro's mother. In 2018, he published a story of Imaro in the anthology The Mighty Warriors, edited by Robert M. Price.

He was posthumously inducted into the CSSFA Hall of Fame in 2025.

== Bibliography ==
=== Imaro ===
1. Imaro (1981) Second Edition (2006) Third Edition (2014)
2. The Quest for Cush (1984) Second Edition (2008)
3. The Trail of Bohu (1985) Second Edition (2009)
4. The Naama War (2009)
5. Nyumbani Tales (2017)

=== Dossouye ===
1. Dossouye (2008)
2. Dossouye: The Dancers of Mulukau (2012)

=== Other novels ===
- Damballa (2011)
- Abengoni: First Calling (2014), fantasy novel

=== Non-fiction ===
- Sweat and Soul: The Saga of Black Boxers from the Halifax Forum to Caesars Palace (1990)
- Spirit of Africville (1992)
- Share & Care: The Story of the Nova Scotia Home for Colored Children (1994)
- Black & Bluenose: The Contemporary History of a Community (2002)

=== Essays ===
- Die Black Dog! A Look at Racism in Fantasy – Toadstool Wine (1975)
- Of Chocolate-Covered Conans and Pompous Pygmies – New Fantasy Journal #1 (1976)
- Out to Launch: 1950s Nostalgia – Dark Fantasy #10 (1976)
- Imaginary Beasts of Africa – Simba #1 (1976)
- More Imaginary Beasts of Africa – Simba #2 (1976)
- Why Blacks Don't Read Science Fiction – Windhaven #5 (1977)
- The Gods of Africa – Wax Dragon #1 (1977)
- Three African Superheroes – New Fantasy Journal #2 (1977)
- Farmer of the Apes – Borealis 2 (1979)
- Where Did Those Names Come From – Drums of Nyumbani #1 (1980)
- To Kush and Beyond: The Black Kingdoms of the Hyborian Age – Savage Sword of Conan #56 (1980)
- Fantasy: An International Genre – World Fantasy Convention (1984)
- Out of Africa – Dragon #122 (1987)
- Why Blacks Should Read (and Write) Science Fiction – Dark Matter #1 (2000)

=== Uncollected short stories ===
- Bwala li Mwesu (The Moon Pool) (1976)
- Betrayal in Belverus (Ghor, Kin Slayer chapter VI) (1977)
- Cats in the Cellar (1977)
- Luendi (1977)
- Mai-Kulala (1977)
- The Skeleton Coast (1978)
- Through the Dark Past (co-written with Gene Day) (1978)
- The City of Mists (co-written with Kenneth Huff) (1978)
- Kibanda ya Kufa (The Hut of Death) (1978)
- Death in Jukun (1979)
- Mzee (1984)
- Marwe's Forest (1986)
- Death's Friend (1987)
- Drum Magic (1988)
- Ishu's Gift (1986)
- Out-Steppin' Fetchit (1987)
- The Last Round (1988)
- Scorpion Sand (unknown)
- In the Red Dawn (co-written with Gene Day) (date unknown)
- Imaro and the White Queen (possibly unpublished)
- Amudu's Bargain (2018)

=== Dark Matter anthology ===
see also: Sheree Thomas

- Gimmile's Songs – Dark Matter No. 1 (2000)
- Yahimba's Choice – Dark Matter No. 2 (2004)

=== As editor ===
- Balik and the Sirens of Alcathoe (1977)
- Griots: A Sword and Soul Anthology (2011)

=== Screenplays and radioplays ===
- Amazons – screenplay (1986, based on Agbewe's Sword)
- The Sam Langford Story – radioplay (1987)
- Stormquest – screenplay (1988)
