= The Trail of Bohu =

1985 novel by Charles R. Saunders

Imaro: the Trail of Bohu
- Cover of Imaro: The trail of Bohu 1985 Daw Books
- Author: Charles R. Saunders
- Cover artist: Mshindo Kumba (second edition)
- Language: English
- Series: Imaro
- Genre: Fantasy novel
- Publisher: Daw books (first edition) Sword and Soul Media (second edition)
- Publication date: 1985 (first edition), 2009 (second edition)
- Publication place: United States
- Media type: Print (Paperback)
- Pages: 215 pp
- Preceded by: The Quest for Cush
- Followed by: The Naama War

The Trail of Bohu also known as Imaro III: The Trail of Bohu is a sword and sorcery novel written by Charles R. Saunders, and published by Daw Books in 1985. The Trail of Bohu was the third book of Imaro's series.

A revised version of the novel was published independently in 2009 through Sword & Soul Media and the online press Lulu.

"The magic of the Demon Gods was mobilized for vengeance, was crying out. We will strike in the lands of the Abamba. We will strike along the East Coast. We will strike in Punt and Axum. And we will strike in the heart of Cush itself!"

Daw Books 1985

== Synopsis ==
Imaro, warrior of the Ilyassai, has settled into his new life as a husband and father in the fabled kingdom of Cush. Amid his growing restlessness, unspeakable tragedy strikes, sending Imaro on a grim mission of vengeance. His adversary has no face, but he does have a name: Bohu, the Bringer of Sorrow – a sorcerer of immense power and cruelty.

As Imaro seeks a confrontation with his most formidable foe yet, turmoil spreads across the continent of Nyumbani. The balance between the forces of good, represented by Cush, and evil, represented by the pariah land of Naama, has been disrupted. The gods themselves may have to declare war with one another, before this balance is finally restored.

In the midst of a coming cataclysm, Imaro travels the length of Nyumbani in search of Bohu. During his journey, Imaro finally discovers his own identity – but will this knowledge help him as he battles a formidable array of enemies bent not only on his destruction, but that of Nyumbani itself?

== List of characters ==
The characters in this section are listed in their order of appearance.

- Imaro - son of Katisa, an Ilyassai warrior decreed Benemetapa (heir) of the Monomotapa Empire
- Tanisha - Shikaza woman who becomes Imaro's companion
- Pomphis - Bambuti Pygmy scholar and former jester, now friend of Imaro
- Akhini - Cushite boy, son of Arkhaman
- Arkhaman - Cushite master blacksmith
- Kilewo - son of Imaro, five rains old
- Bohu - servant of the Erriten, Imaro's nemesis
- King Majnun - deposed king of Kitwana and former friend of Pomphis
- Mkwayo - Imaro's father and Monomotapa (Emperor) of the Monomotapa Empire
- Katisa - Imaro's mother, now Dakamatapa (Empress/Queen) of the Monomotapa Empire
