= Tomoe Gozen (novel) =

1981 fantasy novel by Jessica Amanda Salmonson

- First edition
- Author: Jessica Amanda Salmonson
- Illustrator: Wendy Adrian Shultz
- Language: English
- Series: Tomoe Gozen Trilogy
- Genre: Fantasy, Historical
- Publisher: Ace Books
- Publication date: 1981
- Publication place: United States
- Media type: Print Paperback)
- ISBN: 0-441-81653-3
- OCLC: 320788272
- Followed by: The Golden Naginata

Tomoe Gozen is a novel by Jessica Amanda Salmonson, published in 1981. Set in an alternate universe resembling feudal Japan, the book combines the tale of historical female samurai Tomoe Gozen with the legends and creatures of Japanese mythology to create an action-adventure fantasy. It is the first part of the Tomoe Gozen Trilogy which met with some success in the 1980s fantasy novel market. The series is notable for its unusual, highly researched samurai background and feminist story slant.

A revised version of the novel re-titled The Disfavored Hero was published in 1999.

== Plot summary ==
Tomoe Gozen, a warrior of incredible skill, is the vassal of warlord Shojiro Shigeno. In the process of defeating Shigeno's enemy, the Chinese monk Huan, Tomoe is nearly killed. Huan resurrects her on the condition that she turn against her former master, and after committing a series of evil deeds under Huan's power, Tomoe manages to free herself and becomes ronin, or masterless samurai. The story mostly traces Tomoe's attempts to regain her honour, leading her into conflict with enemies, friends and the samurai culture that created her.

== Characters ==
- Tomoe Gozen is the main character. A young woman of fabled martial skills and beauty.
- Huan is an evil Chinese monk who exerts magical control over Tomoe.
- Ushii is Tomoe's friend and comrade, who makes a devilish deal with Huan to save Tomoe's life.
- Ugo Mohri is the Shogun's champion, a famous warrior who serves as Tomoe's greatest adversary.

== Sequels ==
Tomoe Gozen had two sequels, both also published by Ace Books.

- The Golden Naginata (Ace Books 1982; Open Road Media e-book, 2015)
- Thousand Shrine Warrior (Ace Books 1984; Open Road Media e-book, 2015)

== See also ==
- Female samurai
- Jessica Amanda Salmonson
- Historical fantasy

== Reception ==
David R. Dunham reviewed Tomoe Gozen for Different Worlds magazine and stated that "I enjoyed reading the Tomoe Gozen books, and look forward to the next. They give the flavor of medieval Japan. The illustrations are attractive and complement the text."

== Reviews ==
- Review by Baird Searles (1981) in Isaac Asimov's Science Fiction Magazine, November 23, 1981
