= Imaro =

1981 novel by Charles R. Saunders

- Cover of Imaro 1981 Daw Books Cover of Imaro 2006 by Night Shade Books
- Author: Charles R. Saunders
- Language: English
- Series: Imaro
- Genre: Fantasy novel
- Publisher: Daw books (first edition) Night Shade Books (second edition)
- Publication date: 1981 (first edition), 2006 (second edition)
- Publication place: United States
- Media type: Print (Paperback)
- Pages: 224 pp
- ISBN: 1-59780-036-8 (USA paperback) second edition
- Preceded by: N/A
- Followed by: The Quest for Cush

Imaro is a sword and soul novel written by Charles R. Saunders, and published by DAW Books in 1981. It may have been one of the first forays into the sword and sorcery genre by a black author. Saunders wrote and had published two more books in the series, The Quest for Cush in 1984 and The Trail of Bohu in 1985. In 2009, Saunders released The Naama War, the fourth and last Imaro novel, through Lulu.

== Background ==
The novel is a collection of five short stories ("Turkhana Knives", "The Place of Stones", "Slaves of the Giant-Kings", "Horror in the Black Hills", and "The City of Madness") which were originally published during the 1970s in Dark Fantasy, a fanzine published by Canadian comic book artist Gene Day, as well as the fanzines Night Voyages, Dragonbane, and Phantasy Digest.

Imaro was the first book in a proposed series of novels about the eponymous hero, set in the fantasy world of Nyumbani (a continent based on Africa). However, a lawsuit by the Edgar Rice Burroughs estate over a poorly chosen cover quote (The Epic Novel of a Black Tarzan) caused a one-month delay in shipping as the books had to be reprinted, which led to poor sales.

In 2006, publishers Night Shade Books released an updated edition of Imaro. This new edition excludes "The Slaves of the Giant-Kings", which Saunders felt held too many parallels to the present-day Rwandan genocide. It was replaced by "The Afua", a new story.

== Synopsis ==
Growing up among the Ilyassai, a fierce tribe of warrior-herdsmen, a young Imaro struggles for acceptance after the breaking of a taboo forces his mother to leave him behind.

The boy becomes a man unlike any other the Ilyassai has ever seen. His quest for acceptance and identity continues. Yet, Imaro learns he has powerful enemies, both human and inhuman. Prevailing over foes who desire nothing more than to see him dead, Imaro finds that in victory, there can be loss.

Departing from the Ilyassai, Imaro roams afar, wandering across the vast continent of Nyumbani, pitting his prodigious strength or courage against men, beasts, and demons. Hunted by relentless foes, Imaro becomes the hunter. Eventually, he finds friendship and love among people who are like him, exiles and outlaws.

Still, forces beyond Imaro's comprehension are aligned against him. As he rises to prominence, events preordained before Imaro's birth begin to unfold. Powers are stirring in Nyumbani, the Africa of a world that is beyond the one we know. Soon, Imaro learns that some of these powers are aligned against him. As he struggles to hold on to his hard won acceptance, this warrior seeks the answer to the question which has haunted him all his life: Who am I?

== List of characters ==
The characters in this section are listed in their order of appearance.

- Katisa – Imaro's mother, she asks the Ilyassai to raise him as a warrior
- Chitendu – Ilyassai sorcerer and servant of the Mashataan
- Imaro – son of Katisa, born without knowing his father
- Kanoko – an Ilyassai, the childhood enemy of Imaro
- Bomunu – Zanjian member of Imaro's war band turned traitor
- Tanisha – a Shikaza (Kahutu in the first edition) woman who becomes Imaro's companion
- Pomphis – Bambuti Pygmy scholar and former jester, now friend to Imaro
