= Heroic Visions =

Anthology edited by Jessica Amanda Salmonson

- Cover of the first edition.
- Editor: Jessica Amanda Salmonson
- Language: English
- Genre: Fantasy
- Publisher: Ace Books
- Publication date: 1983
- Publication place: United States
- Media type: Print (Paperback)
- Pages: 214
- ISBN: 0-441-32821-0
- Followed by: Heroic Visions II

Heroic Visions is an anthology of fantasy stories, edited by Jessica Amanda Salmonson. It was first published in paperback by Ace Books in 1983.

The book collects eleven new short stories and novelettes by various fantasy authors, with an introduction by Salmonson. A second anthology was published in 1986 as Heroic Visions II.

== Contents ==
- "Introduction" (Jessica Amanda Salmonson)
- "The Curse of the Smalls and the Stars" (Fritz Leiber)
- "Sister Light, Sister Dark" (Jane Yolen)
- "Tales Told to a Toymaker" (Phyllis Ann Karr)
- "Prophecy of the Dragon" (Charles E. Karpuk)
- "Before the Seas Came" (F. M. Busby)
- "Thunder Mother" (Alan Dean Foster)
- "Dancers in the Time-Flux" (Robert Silverberg)
- "Sword Blades and Poppy Seed" (Joanna Russ)
- "The Nun and the Demon" (Grania Davis)
- "Vovko" (Gordon Derevanchuk)
- "The Monkey's Bride" (Michael Bishop)
