= Jules Remedios Faye =

American book artist, letterprress printer and publisher

Jules Remedios Faye (born 1958) is an American author, editor, letterpress printmaker, bookbinder, teacher, and creator of artists’ books. Faye is known for establishing, with Christopher Stern, Stern & Faye Printers, a letterpress print shop & hand book bindery located in Mt. Vernon, Washington. Faye teaches, curates and participates in book arts exhibits and events throughout the Skagit Valley and Puget Sound area.

== Career ==
At age 17, Faye apprenticed to a letterpress job shop in San Francisco. She worked several years in commercial print shops throughout San Francisco and Seattle before founding Stern & Faye Printers with her partner Christopher Stern in 1994. Her initial imprint established in 1990 was Street of Crocodiles Letterpress Printery.

According to John D. Berry, "When they [Stern & Faye] moved out of Seattle in 1994, they settled in the rural Skagit Valley and set up what they referred to as a “printing farm,” with a barn full of working presses and typesetting equipment. Separately and together, they have produced an impressive body of printed work. What’s unique may be their combination of “fine press” sensibility and a freewheeling approach to typography and art."

Faye's archives are held in part at the National Museum of Women in the Arts.

=== Select artist books ===
- Words every child has a right to know, with Lou Cabeen, 2019
- Red Ochre, with Clifford Burke, 2017
- The accidental art machine : studies in the collaboration between accident and design, with Clifford Burke, 2017
- De Todos Corazon. (2015)
- Apparitions among us, with Lou Cabeen, 2014
- The Infant Sun Within. (2012)
- Sacred Vehicle. (2012)
- From the printer's garden, 2000
- Fallen Angels: A Gallery of Wood & Linoleum Cuts by Twenty Artists Accompanied by a Tale as Told to Jules Remedios Faye. (1999) (With Chris Stern)
- On the far side of the world the sun has stopped, 1999
- I can remember my father in his winter garden, with C. Christopher Stern, 1997
- The abandoned pleasure garden, with C. Christopher Stern, 199?
- The Ladies Printing Bee: An Anthology of Thirty-Nine Letterpress Printers Addressing the Subject of Women’s Work. (1995) (Intro by Sandra Kroupa)
- The Annunciation: An Allegorical Tale of the Virgin as Warrior & Protectress: To Be Used as a Portable Alter, 1993
- The Mechanical Dreamer: Il Sognatore Meccanico : A Fabulous Tale of Italian Dreams Told in Linoblocks Cut During the Perseid Meteor Showers, 1993
- Water Dogs, 1992
- The Devil's Shoe, 1991

=== Publications ===
- "The Café of the Beautiful Assassins." Fantasy Macabre issue 10 (1988) edited by Jessica Amanda Salmonson
- "The Promenade of Misshapen Animals." Fantasy Macabre, issue 11 (1988)
- "Pandora Pandaemonia." In What Did Miss Darrington See? : An Anthology of Feminist Supernatural Fiction (1989) (Edited by Jessica Amanda Salmonson)
- "A Light from Out of Our Heart." In Tales By Moonlight II (1989) (Edited by Jessica Amanda Salmonson)
- Wisewomen and Boggy-Boos: A Dictionary of Lesbian Fairy Lore (1992) (Editor. With Jessica Amanda Salmonson)
- The Mysterious Doom: And Other Ghostly Tales of the Pacific Northwest (1992) (With Jessica Amanda Salmonson)
