= The Golden Naginata =

1982 novel by Jessica Amanda Salmonson

The Golden Naginata is a 1982 sequel to Tomoe Gozen written by Jessica Amanda Salmonson.

== Plot summary ==
The Golden Naginata is a novel in which samurai Tomoe Gozen escapes an arranged marriage, and clashes with a tengu demon, avenges the ghost of her sword's maker, and encounters a fortune-teller followed by a red oni devil.

== Reception ==
David R. Dunham reviewed The Golden Naginata for Different Worlds magazine and stated that "I enjoyed reading the Tomoe Gozen books, and look forward to the next. They give the flavor of medieval Japan. The illustrations are attractive and complement the text."

== Reviews ==
- Review by Judith A. Clark (1982) in Science Fiction & Fantasy Book Review, #4, May 1982
- Review by Chris Bailey (1982) in Paperback Inferno, Volume 6, Number 1
- Review by Thomas A. Easton [as by Tom Easton] (1982) in Analog Science Fiction/Science Fact, October 1982
- Review by James D. Riemer (1982) in Extrapolation, Winter 1982
