= Amazons II =

Fantasy anthology edited by Jessica Amanda Salmonson

- Cover of the first edition
- Editor: Jessica Amanda Salmonson
- Cover artist: Michael Whelan
- Language: English
- Genre: Fantasy
- Publisher: DAW Books
- Publication date: 1982
- Publication place: United States
- Media type: Print (paperback)
- Pages: 239
- ISBN: 0-87997-736-1
- OCLC: 8531231
- LC Class: CPB Box no. 2892 vol. 4
- Preceded by: Amazons!

Amazons II is an anthology of fantasy stories, edited by Jessica Amanda Salmonson, with a cover by Michael Whelan. Following up her earlier anthology Amazons!, it consists, like its predecessor volume, of works featuring female protagonists by mostly female authors. It was first published in paperback by DAW Books in June 1982. "In the Lost Lands" was adapted into a film of the same name in 2025.

== Summary ==
The book collects 12 short stories and novelettes by various fantasy authors, with an introduction by Salmonson.

== Contents ==
- "Introduction: Art, History and Amazons" (Jessica Amanda Salmonson)
- "For a Daughter" (F. M. Busby)
- "The Battle Crow's Daughter" (Gillian Fitzgerald)
- "Southern Lights" (Tanith Lee)
- "Zroya's Trizub" (Gordon Derevanchuk)
- "The Robber Girl" (Phyllis Ann Karr)
- "Lady of the Forest End" (Gaèl Baudino)
- "The Ivory Comb" (Eleanor Arnason)
- "The Borders of Sabazel" (Lillian Stewart Carl)
- "Who Courts a Reluctant Maiden" (Ardath Mayhar)
- "The Soul Slayer" (Lee Killough)
- "Nightwork" (Jo Clayton)
- "In the Lost Lands" (George R. R. Martin)

== Awards ==
The collection placed nineteenth in the 1983 Locus Award poll for Best Anthology.
