= Las aventuras de Tremendo =

1986 film by Enrique Cahen Salaberry

- Screenshot
- Directed by: Enrique Cahen Salaberry
- Written by: Salvador Valverde Calvo
- Produced by: Enrique Cahen Salaberry
- Cinematography: Leonardo Rodríguez Solís
- Edited by: Serafín Molina
- Music by: Mike Rivas
- Release date: 20 February 1986 (Argentina)
- Running time: 95 minutes
- Country: Argentina
- Language: Spanish

Las aventuras de Tremendo is a 1986 Argentine film directed by Enrique Cahen Salaberry and written by Salvador Valverde Calvo. The cinematography was performed by Leonardo Rodríguez Solís.

== Synopsis ==
Betty, the teenage granddaughter of billionaire Leopoldo Vargas, is determined to have the Tremendo group perform at her birthday party, no matter the expense. The band, that are vacationing in the Paraná Delta, refuse to perform, which unleashes a series of hilarious deeds, from Betty's kidnapping of Fortunato, the band's bumbling manager, the finding of an abandoned baby on the doorstep of the band's vacationing house, to Fortunato's confrontation with Vargas after discovering his plan to evict an inhabited area of the island to build a sawmill — all amidst the band's performances and choreographies of their greatest hits.

== Cast ==
- Tristán as Fortunato Bellavista Malatesta, Tremendo's manager
- Tremendo as Themselves
- Karina Bolán as Betty, a spoiled teenage girl who is a fan of Tremendo's
- Fernando Siro as Leopoldo Vargas, a ruthless businessman and Betty's grandfather
- Mónica Gonzaga as Susana Castellani, a daycare manager whose business is about to get evicted by Vargas, and Fortunato's love interest
- Juancito Díaz as Ángel, Fortunato's secretary
- Guido Gorgatti as Pablo, Vargas' butler and chauffeur
- Mónica Núñez Cortés
- Carlos Rivkin as Dr. Jiménez, Vargas' lawyer
- Noelia Noto as Patricia, Betty's friend
- Sebastián Miranda as Toto, Betty's cousin and Vargas' grandnephew
- Jesús Berenguer
- Julio Pelieri
- Manuel Martín
