= The Quest for Cush =

1984 novel by Charles R. Saunders

Imaro: The Quest for Cush
- Cover of Imaro: The Quest for Cush, 1984 by DAW Books
- Author: Charles R. Saunders
- Language: English
- Series: Imaro
- Genre: Fantasy novel
- Publisher: DAW books (first edition) Night Shade Books (second edition)
- Publication date: 1984 (first edition), 2008 (second edition)
- Publication place: United States
- Media type: Print (Paperback)
- Pages: 214 pp
- ISBN: 978-1-59780-066-2 (USA paperback) second edition
- Preceded by: Imaro
- Followed by: The Trail of Bohu

The Quest for Cush, also known as Imaro II: The Quest for Cush, is a collection of four sword and sorcery short stories written by Charles R. Saunders, and published by DAW Books in 1984 as the second book in the original Imaro Trilogy.

== Synopsis ==
Defeated and demoralized by treachery within the bandit tribes that he led, Imaro searches for vengeance, and his kidnapped lover Tanisha. In the City of Madness, he discovers both, along with a new ally, Pomphis, who seemingly possesses information about the dark forces which have hounded Imaro all his life.

Pomphis doesn't have all the answers, but he suggests they might be found in the legendary city of Cush. As they embark on their quest for Cush, the forces arrayed against Imaro grow bolder, manifesting themselves as assassins, monsters, and deadly creatures from the sea; all in a desperate attempt to prevent Imaro from reaching his destination. As the forces grow deadlier, the true nature of the coming continent-wide conflict becomes increasingly more apparent.

== List of characters ==
In order of appearance:

- Imaro - son of Katisa, son of no father
- Tanisha - Shikaza woman who becomes Imaro's companion
- Pomphis - Bambuti Pygmy scholar and former jester, now friend to Imaro
- Rabir - A Zanjian sea captain who winds up being one if his friends after transporting him to Cush

== Publication history ==
Charles R. Saunders had written a series of sword & sorcery short stories that appeared in Dark Fantasy, a Canadian fanzine published by comic book artist Gene Day during the 1970s. Five of these were collected and published by DAW Books in 1981 titled Imaro. Four more short stories ("In Mwenni", "In Bana-Gui", "On the Bahari Mashiriki", and "In Kush") were gathered together and published as The Quest for Cush.

An updated trade paperback version of The Quest for Cush was published in 2008 by Night Shade Books. It is an update of the DAW version of the novel, in which Saunders moves Imaro's first meeting with Tanisha and Pomphis from the last chapter in Imaro, the first book in the series, to the first chapter in The Quest for Cush.

== Reception ==
In Issue 29 of Abyss, Eric Olson commented, "If you have an interest in Dark Fantasy or Heroic Fantasy, this is what you should be reading." Olson pointed out "[Imaro] has ideas as well as muscles ... and best of all, he has real emotions, trauma, and internal tensions, which form the cognitive core of this book." Olson concluded, "The characters are well developed and the situations are as unusual as the background. I'd recommend finding the first book, reading this one and then waiting expectantly for the next one."
