= Stormquest =

- Home video cover art
- Directed by: Alejandro Sessa
- Screenplay by: Charles R. Saunders
- Story by: Alejandro Sessa
- Produced by: Hector Olivera executive Ed Garland
- Starring: Brent Huff; Kai Baker; Mónica Gonzaga; Rocky Giordani
- Edited by: Eduardo López
- Production companies: Aries Productions; Benlox Investment
- Distributed by: Media Home Entertainment (VHS)
- Release dates: 1987; 16 November 1988 (U.S. video)
- Running time: 90 minutes
- Countries: Argentina; United States
- Language: English

Stormquest (Spanish: El ojo de la tormenta) is a 1987 Argentine-American sword and sorcery fantasy adventure film directed by Alejandro Sessa and written by Charles R. Saunders, based on a story Sessa created for the film. It was not released commercially in cinemas, and it was instead launched directly to the video market in the United States in 1988. It was one of the last entries in a total of ten movies Roger Corman made in Argentina.

== Synopsis ==
In the fictional medieval kingdom of Kimbia, all the power is handled by the women in a matriarchy, holding men in a subordinate position. A group of women comes forward, advocating for gender equality within the realm. After fleeing their land the group meets several men with which they bond and decide to fight together to change the rules of Kimbia's society.

== Reception ==
Variety called it "an enjoyable fantasy feature lensed in Argentina that Philip Wylie might have enjoyed: the women battling the men."
