= Vincent O'Sullivan (American writer) =

American poet (1868–1940)

- Born: November 28, 1868; New York City, U.S.
- Died: July 18, 1940 (aged 71)
- Occupations: Short story writer; poet; critic
- Parent(s): Eugene O'Sullivan; Christine O'Sullivan

Vincent O'Sullivan (November 28, 1868 – July 18, 1940) was an American-born short story writer, poet and critic.

== Biography ==
Born in New York City to Eugene and Christine O'Sullivan, he began his education in the New York public school system and completed it in Britain. he lived comfortably in London, travelling often to France, until in 1909 he lost his income from the family coffee business when his brother Percy made a spectacularly mistimed futures gamble at the New York Coffee Exchange. The entire family was ruined, and Vincent was destitute for the remaining years of his life. His works dealt with the morbid and decadent. He was a friend of Oscar Wilde (to whom in his disgrace he was often generous), Leonard Smithers, Aubrey Beardsley and other fin-de-siècle figures. O'Sullivan produced his first collection of supernatural fiction, A Book of Bargains, in 1896. It contains the pact-with the devil story "The Bargain of Rupert Orange", and The Business of Madame Jahn and "My Enemy and Myself", which both feature reanimated corpses. "When I Was Dead" (1896), "Verschoyle's House" (1915) and "The Burned House" (1916) are ghost stories, while "Will" is a tale of psychic vampirism.

== Reception ==
Robert Aickman wrote of O'Sullivan that:

[his short story] "When I Was Dead" is a very rictus or spasm of guilt; sudden and shattering. Vincent O'Sullivan was a master of this dyeing and soaking in guilt. The curious should try to find a copy of his novel, The Good Girl. The quest is difficult, but the product distinctive. O'Sullivan, having lived a longish life as a more or less well-to-do rentier, in latish middle age found himself ruined, wrote his last book (Opinions) under terrible conditions, and, dying in Paris, ended anonymously in the common pit for the cadavers of paupers.

John Cowper Powys listed The Good Girl at number 97 in his One Hundred Best Books. "This admirable work of art is not known as well as it deserves either in England or America," he said:

It is a work of genius in every sense of that word, and it produces on the mind that curious sense of completeness and finality which only such works produce... The author of this book must have a noble and formidable soul.

== Works ==
- Poems (1896)
- A Book of Bargains (1896)
- The Houses of Sin (1897)
- The Green Window (1899)
- A Dissertation Upon Second Fiddles (1902)
- Human Affairs (1907)
- The Good Girl (1912)
- Sentiment and Other Stories (1913)
- Aspects of Wilde (1936)
- Opinions (1959)
