= The Tree of Swords and Jewels =

1983 novel by C. J. Cherryh

- First edition cover
- Author: C. J. Cherryh
- Cover artist: Michael Whelan
- Language: English
- Series: Ealdwood Stories
- Genre: Fantasy
- Publisher: DAW Books
- Publication date: August 1983
- Publication place: United States
- Media type: Print (paperback)
- Pages: 256
- ISBN: 0-87997-850-3
- Preceded by: The Dreamstone

The Tree of Swords and Jewels is a 1983 fantasy novel by American writer C. J. Cherryh. It is the second of two novels in Cherryh's Ealdwood Stories series, the first being The Dreamstone. The series draws on Celtic mythology and is about Ealdwood, a forest at the edge of Faery, and Arafel, a Daoine Sidhe.

The Tree of Swords and Jewels was first published in 1983 as a paperback edition by DAW Books, and featured cover art by Michael Whelan. The Dreamstone and The Tree of Swords and Jewels were later republished in three omnibuses:

- Arafel's Saga (1983, DAW Books)
- Ealdwood (1991, Victor Gollancz) – includes revisions and a new ending
- The Dreaming Tree (1997, DAW Books) – includes the revisions and new ending of Ealdwood (1991)

== Plot summary ==
In The Dreamstone Arafel, a Daoine Sidhe helps Ciaran, a halfling (half human, half elf) save Caer Wiell near to Ealdwood forest, the last remaining bastion of Faery on Earth. The Tree of Swords and Jewels continues the story ten years later, when Ciaran has married Branwyn and become Lord of Caer Wiell. All of Caer Wiell are aware of Ciaran's connections to the Sidhe, whom they fear. One day Arafel visits Ciaran and returns elf prince Liosliath's dreamstone to him, saying that she needs his help: dark forces have awakened again and have overrun part of Eald (Faery). Ciaran tells her that peace in the region is fragile: King Laochailan does not trust him, and Ciaran's brother Donnchadh of Caer Donn fears him and his elf heritage.

Arafel begins searching for those responsible for the shrinking of Eald, and discovers Duilliath, a drow (dark elf) living in Dun Gol, the site of an ancient elf battle. Dun Gol is close to Caer Donn, and Duilliath has begun influencing Donnchadh's thoughts and actions. Just as Arafel controls Caer Wiell, Duilliath controls Caer Donn. Arafel tries to coax him back to sleep again, but a duel erupts and she is injured, forcing her to retreat to Eald. Trees in Eald are dying and Arafel tries unsuccessfully to call on the departed elves for help.

When Ciaran learns that King Laochailan is ill, he tries to contact his brother, and when that fails he enters Eald to ask for Arafel's help, but finds Duilliath there. While trying to flee Eald, Ciaran is ambushed by An Beag bandits, who mortally wound him—only Liosliath's stone about his neck keeps him alive. Duilliath, with plans to expand his armies and influence, instructs Donnchadh to go to Dun na h-Eoin, kill Laochailan and install himself as king. Ciaran manages to return to Caer Wiell, where he lies on his deathbed. Upon hearing that Donnchadh is the new king, Ciaran makes one last attempt to contact Arafel and enters Eald.

One of Arafel's aides instructs Branwyn to evacuate Caer Wiell, and he takes her people to the safety of Beorc's Steading, a sanctuary hidden in a valley. In Eald, Ciaran finds his elf horse waiting for him, but they are pursued by dark elves and he flees to the sea. Dying, and with nowhere else to go, Ciaran draws on the power of his stone and is given Camhanach, a silver horn. His last act is to blow three times into the horn, which summons the Daoine Sidhe. But this act also releases Nathair Sgiathach, an ancient dragon that the Sidhe had bound to Cinniuint, the Tree of Swords and Jewels.

Nathair Sgiathach confronts a weakened Arafel and threatens to enslave her. Liosliath returns, takes over Ciaran's body, and kills Donnchadh, now occupied by Duilliath. Liosliath and several other elves rush to Arafel's assistance in Ealdwood and defeat the dragon. Liosliath and Arafel later visit Branwyn at the Steading and tell her that she is free to build her own Caer Wiell as this land has left mortal Earth. It is safe from the dark things that have burrowed again, and the drow that has returned to sleep at Dun Gol.

== Reception ==
The Rambles cultural arts magazine described the Arafel's Saga omnibus as "an epic tale of magic and adventure" and recommended it to anyone interested in legendary Fair Folk. In a review of The Dreaming Tree omnibus on the SF Site, Stephen Davis said that while Cherryh's writing is "first-rate", and he would recommend the book, he felt that the revised ending is "a bit mechanical", and found that "the final battle between good and evil, and its aftermath" is "less than satisfying".

== Award nominations ==
- 1984 Locus Awards for Best Fantasy Novel.

== Sources ==
- Cherryh, C. J. (1983). The Tree of Swords and Jewels. DAW Books. ISBN 0-87997-850-3.
- Cherryh, C. J. (1997). The Dreaming Tree. DAW Books. ISBN 0-88677-782-8.
