= Amazons (1986 film) =

1986 Argentine film directed by Alejandro Sessa

- Theatrical release film poster by Boris Vallejo
- Directed by: Alejandro Sessa
- Written by: Charles R. Saunders
- Based on: "Agbewe’s Sword" by Charles R. Saunders
- Produced by: Héctor Olivera
- Starring: Penelope Reed; Danitza Kingsley; Joseph Whipp; Ty Randolph; Jacques Arndt
- Cinematography: Leonard Solis
- Edited by: Edward Lowe
- Music by: Oscar Camp
- Production companies: Aries Films International (Argentina); Concorde Pictures (US)
- Distributed by: Concorde Pictures (US); Aries Films Internacional; MGM/US (video)
- Release date: 1986
- Running time: 76 minutes
- Countries: Argentina; United States
- Language: English

Amazons is a 1986 sword-and-sorcery film directed by Alejandro Sessa and written by Charles R. Saunders, based on his 1979 short story "Agbewe’s Sword". It stars Penelope Reed, Danitza Kingsley, Joseph Whipp, Ty Randolph, and Jacques Arndt.

== Plot ==
Amazons is an epic story that follows a legendary tribe of warrior women from a mythical time, whose spirits are tied to magical trees. The amazons are currently being attacked by an army led by the evil king Kalungo, whose magic powers are given by the Weird Ways and the demonic being Balgore. The amazons' High Priest performs a ceremony, which reveals the magic sword of Azundati in the future of amazon warrior Dyala. Thinking the sword can stop Kalungo, the Emerald Queen selects Dyala and Tashi to retrieve the sword. Unbeknownst to Dyala, Tashi's mother, the one-armed combat instructor Tshingi tasks her daughter to kill Dyala and retrieve the sword for her, as she wants revenge for Dyala's mother cutting off her arm due to a fight over a man.

Tshingi is also revealed to be working for Kalungo, who promised to make her the next Emerald Queen. She warns Kalungo, but tells him Tashi will get the sword for her and that he shouldn't worry. Not trusting Tshingi not to turn on him, Kalungo tasks his shape-shifting servant Akam to trail the two warriors, make sure they reach the sword, and then kill them.

Meanwhile, oppressed servants of Kalungo plan a rebellion against him. The guards capture one of them, Vishti, but she manages to stab the guard who tries to rape her and escape in his clothes to join the amazons.

Dyala and Tashi are attacked by bandits while bathing, who try to rape them, but Akam, shapeshifted to a lioness, kills a bandit and Dyala kills the rest. They enter the area of the masked demon-worshipping Pagash, who kidnap some drugged women sent to the forest as sacrifices for a demonic tree. The Pagash capture Tashi with a trap as well. Dyala lures the Pagash away and kills them with the traps she has set, and saves Tashi from sacrifice in the last minute.

They meet a horse that leads them to a nomadic seer. She predicts that three will enter the cave holding the sword, but only one will leave - and that the holder of the sword has to pay a price.

After crossing a gorge on ropes, the two of them enter the cave, followed by Akam in lioness form. Dyala claims the sword, and Tashi is unable to stab her in the back, as they have become friends. Akam hurls a knife at Dyala, and Tashi pushes her out of the way, dying to save her. Akam shapeshifts to a lioness and fights Dyala, but she manages to stab her to death. In the meantime, the amazons mount an attack on Kalungo's castle, but he has the upper hand due to his magic, which the High Priest can only repel for a while with the aid of the Soul Stone.

Dyala returns to the seer, who reveals she is the legendary Azundati whom the sword belonged to. She gives Dyala her horse, which can navigate the Weird Ways and take her instantly to the amazons. In the Weird Ways, Balgore attacks Dyala but she kills him with the sword. Using the magic sword, she reflects Kalungo's spells on his army, turning the tide of the battle. She follows a fleeing Kalungo, and after a fierce battle, beheads him. Displaying the head makes Kalungo's army surrender. The Queen names Dyala as the new commander, however she suddenly feels intense pain and realizes someone is trying to cut down her spirit-tree. It is Tshingi, and the two have an intense fight. Tshingi managed to cut down Dyala's tree, but it lands on her and crushes her to death. Dyala survives because possession of the sword made her immortal. She leaves to return the sword to the cave, but finds Tashi at Azundati's tent, alive. She explains Azundati somehow brought her back to life, then left, saying her task is over. The two friends embrace each other and ride off on a new adventure.

== Cast ==
- Mindi Miller as Dyala (as Windsor Taylor Randolph)
- Penelope Reed as Tashi
- Joseph Whipp as Kalungo
- Danitza Kingsley as Tshingi
- Wolfram Hecht as Matlin (as Wolfram Hoechst)
- Jacques Arndt ... High Priest
- Charles Finch ... Timar
- Francisco Cocuzza ... Baliguri (as Frank Cocza)
- Santiago Mallo ... Halfhead
- Anita Larronde ... Emerald Queen (as Annie Larronde)
- Armando Capo ... Hitron (as Armand Capó)
- Maria Fournery ... Vishti (as Mary Fournery)
- Nöelle Balfour ... Lati
- Esther Velázquez ... Azundati
- Marcos Woinsky ... Artan (as Marc Woinsky)
- Fabiana Smith ... Lioness (Akam)
- William Reta ... Guard
- Lena Marie Johansson ... Female Noble #1
- Linda Guzmán ... Female Noble #2

== Reception ==
Variety called it "a lightweight entry in the science fiction/fantasy sweepstakes, offering some statuesque beauties doing hand and sword battle, and little else. Pic has bypassed theatrical release [in the US], going straight to video... Story is harder to follow than it should be, with not much dramatic impetus to maintain viewer interest. Filmmakers, while intent on lining up the most attractive actresses they can, strain credibility by casting two thesps of same approximate age as mother and daughter." The French magazine Impact called the film a refreshing return to the good old days of the 1960s peplums. Lawrence Ellsworth, in his book Cinema of Swords, gave a rating of two out of five and wrote: "[...] this barbarian boob-fest may be the best of Corman's cheapo Argentine action fantasies, though that's admittedly a low bar."
