= David A. Cherry =

American artist

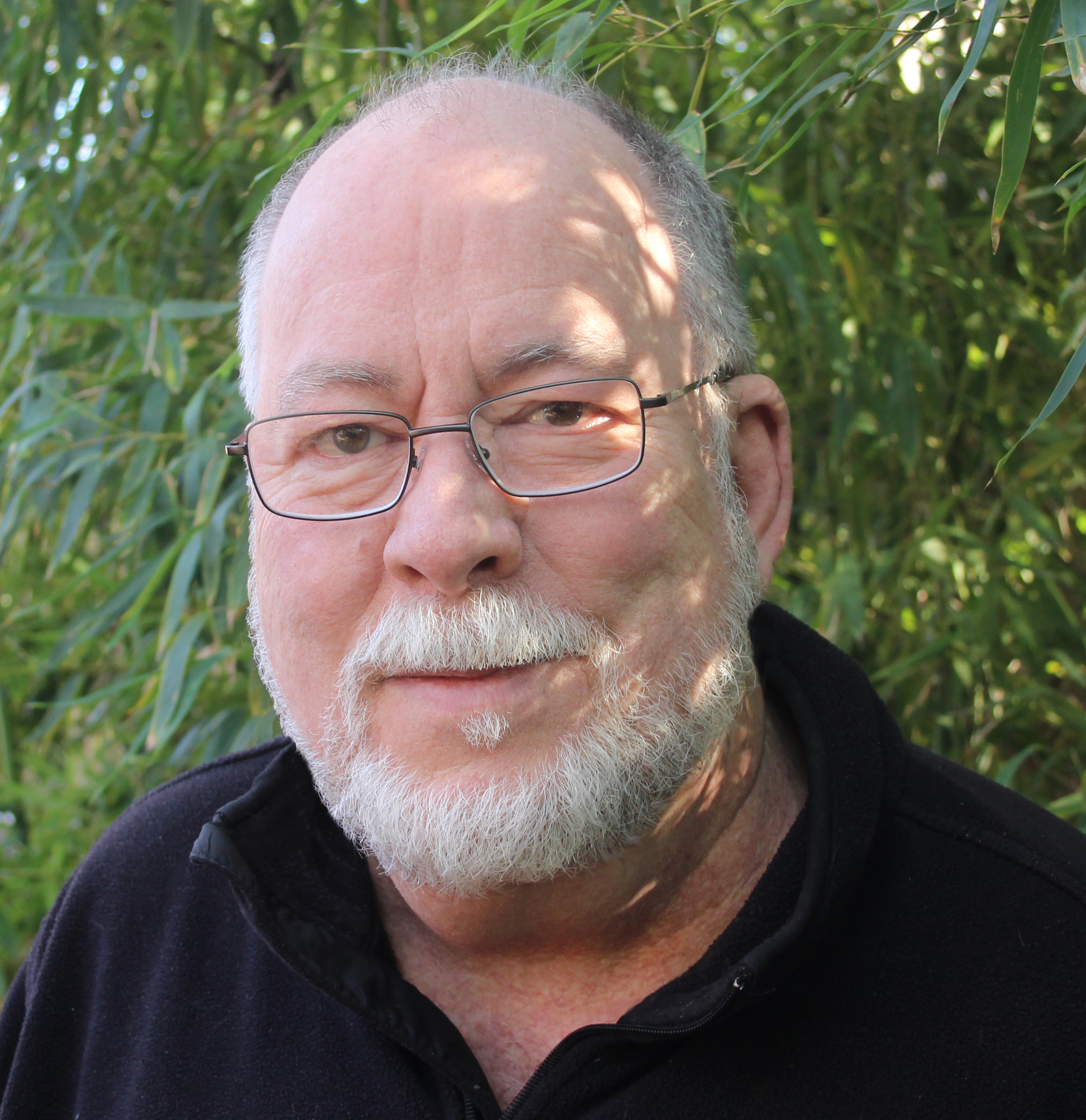
- Cherry in 2018
- Born: December 14, 1949 (age 76); Lawton, Oklahoma, United States
- Education: University of Oklahoma; University of Oklahoma School of Law
- Known for: Painting, drawing, 3D modeling
- Movement: Fantasy art, realism
- Relatives: C. J. Cherryh (sister)
- Website: davidcherryart.com

David Alan Cherry (born December 14, 1949) is an American artist, author, and illustrator of science fiction and fantasy and has also done substantial work as a marketing artist, concept artist, and 3D modeler in the game production industry. Cherry served as Lecturer and Head of the Art Department as well as Head of the master's degree Program for artists at The Guildhall at SMU (Southern Methodist University), a graduate college dedicated to studies for people who want to work in the game production industry. Cherry was also an attorney, as well as a past president of the Association of Science Fiction and Fantasy Artists (1988–1990). He has been nominated eleven times for Hugo Awards, and 18 times for Chesley Awards (with 8 wins).

Although at ease with oil painting and most other traditional media, Cherry usually works in acrylic paint. As an illustrator of literary works, Cherry has illustrated or done cover art for the works of such authors as Stephen R. Donaldson, Marion Zimmer Bradley, Lois McMaster Bujold, Terry Brooks, William Shatner, David Brin, L. Sprague de Camp, Poul Anderson, Piers Anthony, John Brunner, and his sister, C. J. Cherryh, among others. Publishers for whom Cherry has worked include DAW Books; New American Library; Ballantine Books; Del Rey Books; Ace Books; TOR Books; Friedlander Publishing Group; Pocket Books; Phantasia Press; Donald M. Grant Publishing; The Hamilton Collection; Skybox Press; The Science Fiction Book Club; Bits and Pieces; Precedence Publishing; Pegasus Publishing; Iron Crown Enterprises; The Bradford Exchange; The Donning Company Publishers; and many others.

== Biography: 1949–1982 ==
David Alan Cherry was born in Lawton, Oklahoma to Basil Lafayette Cherry and Lois Ruth Cherry. Cherry's paternal grandfather, Robert Edward Cherry, was a cowboy punching cattle in the new state of Oklahoma when Basil was born. Cherry's parents are from Anadarko, Oklahoma. Cherry's only sibling is Carolyn Janice Cherry, better known as C. J. Cherryh, one of the top authors of fantasy and science fiction. C.J. was seven when David was born.

Cherry'’s mother home-schooled him for kindergarten with the result that when he entered first grade at B.C. Sweeney Elementary in Lawton, he could write and was reading at a fourth-grade level. When he was nine, Cherry’s family moved to Oklahoma City where he attended first Andrew Johnson Elementary then Ridgeview Elementary, Herbert Hoover Junior High School, and John Marshall High School. He learned art mostly from his sister, C.J. Cherryh, whom he credits with teaching him the basics of color theory and proportion. Cherry’s sister also graduated from John Marshall High School seven years ahead of him. In college, she majored in Classics at the University of Oklahoma. After graduation with Honors, C.J. received a Woodrow Wilson Fellowship pursuant to which she obtained a Master’s degree in Classics from Johns Hopkins University in Baltimore, MD. All of this led C.J. back to Oklahoma City and John Marshall High School where she became a teacher and had Cherry as a student during his senior year for Latin and Ancient History.

When it was Cherry’s turn to go to college, he too attended the University of Oklahoma. He wanted to study art, but decided against it when he saw that the art schools available to him only taught modern art, which he described as "throwing paint at a board and then melting toy tanks over it in protest to the Vietnam War". Instead, he majored in Latin and took as many courses as possible in Greek, French, German, and Ancient History. He graduated in 1972 scholastically in the top ten percent of the nation with a Bachelor of Arts Degree in Latin, General Honors, and admission to Phi Beta Kappa. Cherry then entered the University of Oklahoma School of Law and graduated with a Juris Doctor degree in 1975.

From 1975 through 1982 Cherry practiced law in Oklahoma City and Edmond, Oklahoma specializing in Transportation Law before the Interstate Commerce Commission. In 1976 two of C.J. Cherryh's novels were published by DAW Books and Cherry accompanied her to the 1976 World Science Fiction Convention in Kansas City. There he met many writers, editors, and publishers as well as a number of the artists who were doing paintings for science fiction and fantasy book covers. Michael Whelan, in particular, stood out. Cherry already knew who he was since Michael had done the art for C.J.’s book covers as well as the art for the cover of the Marion Zimmer Bradley book Cherry happened to be reading at the time. The original painting was on display in an art show at the convention, and Cherry was able to buy it at auction. Later that evening Cherry was able to meet Michael at a dinner that C.J.’s publisher, Donald A. Wollheim of DAW Books, had invited them to. Cherry credits that meeting for inspiring him to make the transition from attorney to illustrator.

In 1981, C.J. Cherryh encouraged Cherry to do the cover and interior illustrations for Ealdwood, a fantasy novella C. J. was bringing out with Donald M. Grant Publishing. In 1982, Cherry closed the doors of his law firm and concentrated on increasing his skills with pencil and paint. His problem was that the work on Ealdwood was pretty much the only color work he had ever done. As a painter, he still had much to learn.

== Biography: 1982–2000 ==
In 1987 Cherry took home two Chesley Awards, one for Best Cover Illustration and one for Best Color Work. The Chesley Awards are presented annually by ASFA, The Association of Science Fiction and Fantasy Artists to honor excellence in the field. In the years to come, Cherry would be nominated for sixteen more Chesley Awards, six of which he would win. Cherry would win virtually every other award available for his art except the Hugo Award for Best Artist. He would be nominated for that award 10 times.

Another important landmark in Cherry's career occurred in 1987. The Donning Company Publishers brought out a book of 40 of Cherry's paintings along with a treatise written by Cherry providing step by step instruction on his painting technique at that time. The book was entitled Imagination: The Art and Technique of David A. Cherry. In 1988, that book was nominated for the Hugo Award for Best Non-fiction Book of 1987.

In 1991, a science fiction short story by Cherry, The Odd Man Out, appeared in the anthology, The War Years: The Jupiter War, edited by William Fawcett and David Drake, published by ROC Books.

In 1993, Ballantine Books was preparing to publish a coffee table book entitled The Art of Michael Whelan in tribute to the art he had created for Ballantine Books over the years. He asked Cherry to interview him as his fellow artist, and the included interview is entitled "Materials and Methods".

In 1995, Friedlander Publishing Group published a fifty card set of trading cards entitled David Cherry Fantasy Art Trading Cards. That same year Artist's Market published a lead article by Cherry entitled Research Turns Fantasy Into Reality in which Cherry provided an insider's view into the day to day effort involved in operating a successful business as a freelance illustrator. 1995 was also the year Cherry received the honor of being invited by The Fellows of the Smithsonian to appear at the Smithsonian Institution and give a presentation about his art and career. Also in 1995, Cherry was selected as one of the jury for Spectrum 2, an annual publication of Spectrum Fantastic Art.

Since 1980, Cherry had lived on Pineoak Drive in Edmond, Oklahoma and worked out of his studio there, but in December 1999 he and his family moved to McKinney, Texas, a suburb of Dallas. Once settled in, Cherry accepted an offer from William Fawcett to do the cover and all of the interior illustrations – color and monochrome – for an oversized, coffee table book for Ballantine Books which would be entitled The World of Shannara, a companion guide to the fantasy world created by Terry Brooks.

== Biography: 2000–2008 ==
Cherry was not done on The World of Shannara project when he received an offer from Tony Goodman, the owner and CEO of Ensemble Studios, a Dallas-based game company which was poised to begin production on a computer game called Age of Mythology. The position would be Senior Concept Artist, and Cherry would be responsible for the concept art for all of the minor and major gods and goddesses of the Greeks, Romans, Norse, and Egyptians. Shortly after Cherry signed with Ensemble Studios, it was acquired by Microsoft. The World of Shannara, by Terry Brooks and illustrated by David Cherry was published by Ballantine Books in 2001. That would be the last freelance illustration project of Cherry's for a long time.

The game, Age of Mythology, by Ensemble Studios, Inc. was published in 2002 by Microsoft. During the development of the game, Cherry's job description at Ensemble Studios had begun to morph to suit the changing artistic needs of the project, which resulted in him "preparing marketing materials: ads, brochures, magazine covers, etc." In addition to numerous magazine covers, Cherry created the box cover for the game. At the annual Electronic Entertainment Expo in 2001, his box cover art was displayed seven stories tall directly over the entrance to E3. Eventually, Cherry taught himself how to work in 3D Studio Max and joined the Ensemble Modeling Team. After Age of Mythology, Cherry stayed with Ensemble through the production and release of its expansion pack, Age of Mythology: The Titans; Age of Empires III and its expansion pack, Age of Empires III: The Asian Dynasties; as well as the Xbox title: Halo Wars. He often had to switch between preparing marketing art and building game content in 3D.

In 2008 Microsoft decided to close Ensemble Studios, at which time Cherry approached The Guildhall at SMU. The Guildhall is a graduate school which offers a master's degree in Interactive Technology, designed "from the ground up to provide the same kind of support for the game production industry that law schools provide for the practice of law and medical schools provide for the practice of the healing arts". He began in 2009 and left on December 31, 2012. During his time there, Cherry became head of the Art department as well as the master's degree program for the Art Track. Cherry then chaired a committee responsible for a total rewrite of the Art Track's curriculum.

== Biography: 2013–present ==
In 2013 Cherry moved from Dallas to Norman, OK where his daughter, Kassandra Leigh Cherry, was finishing college at The University of Oklahoma. His stated goal from this point "is to do art to please myself, and possibly to show the work from time to time if I am happy with it".

== Honors and awards ==
- 2002 Artist Guest of Honor at ConJose, the 60th Annual World Science Fiction Convention
- 1995 Invitational Speaker at the Smithsonian Institution
- 1995 Judge for the 1994 Spectrum Annual
- 1993 Chesley Award for 1992 Best Cover Illustration – Paperback Book (The Bladeswoman) – cover of Sword and Sorceress IX by Marion Zimmer Bradley (DAW Books)
- 1993 Chesley Award for 1992 Best Monochrome (Tag, You're it!)
- 1992 Chesley Award for 1991 Best Cover Illustration – Paperback Book (The Healer) – cover of Sword and Sorceress VIII by Marion Zimmer Bradley (DAW Books)
- 1992 Chesley Award for Best Color Painting – Unpublished (Filia Mea)
- 1991 The Polly Freas Award for Artistic Merit
- 1991 The Frank R. Paul Award for Artistic Achievement
- 1991 The Skylark Award for significant contribution to the field of Science Fiction
- 1990 The Polly Freas Award for Artistic Merit
- 1989 Chesley Award for contributions to the field of Science Fiction and Fantasy Art—for efforts lobbying against application of Uniform Capitalization Rules to artists
- 1988 Hugo Award Nomination for Best Non-fiction Book of 1987 (For IMAGINATION: THE ART AND TECHNIQUE OF DAVID A CHERRY)
- 1988 Chesley Award—contributions to the field of Science Fiction and Fantasy Artists (For reorganization of The Association of Science Fiction and Fantasy Artists and other services as president of that organization.)
- 1986 Chesley Award for Best Cover Illustration – Hardbound (Channur's Homecoming)
- 1986 Chesley Award for Best Color Work – Unpublished (The Offering)

== Exhibitions ==
- 1994 INTO THE FUTURE

—the Charles B. Goddard Center in Ardmore, Oklahoma.

- 1993 THE MAGIC: 1993 NATIONAL SHOW & SALE

—at Repartee Gallery in Park City, Utah.

- 1992–1993 ART OF THE COSMOS

—Traveling exhibit of astronomical art touring the United States and Canada. Sponsored by the International Association for the Astronomical Arts

- 1990 IN DREAMS AWAKE: THE ART OF FANTASY

—at the Park Avenue Atrium in New York, sponsored by Olympia and York.

- 1990 INTO THE FUTURE: THE ART OF SCIENCE FICTION

—at the Park Avenue Atrium in New York. Sponsored by Olympia and York.

- 1989 THE ART OF FANTASY AND SCIENCE FICTION

—at the Delaware Art Museum, Wilmington, Delaware.

- 1989 INVITATIONAL SCIENCE FICTION AND FANTASY EXHIBITION

—Studio 125, Atlanta, GA

- 1988 SCIENCE FICTION ‘88

—at the Orlando Science Center, Orlando, FL

- 1986 INVITATIONAL EXHIBITION OF THE NATIONAL ACADEMY OF FANTASTIC ART

—at the Delaware Art Museum, Wilmington, DE

- 1984 THE 1984 TOURING FANTASY ART EXHIBITION

—sponsored by the Cultural Arts Council of Plano, TX

== Professional associations ==
- The Association of Science Fiction and Fantasy Artists
  - Member since 1983
  - Past President — 1988 through 1990
  - Vice President — 2004–2006
- Science Fiction Writers of America
  - Member 1988–1999
- National Academy of Fantastic Art
  - Member of the Board 1986–1987
- Oklahoma Bar Association
  - Member since 1975
