= Lazarus (short story) =

1906 short story by Leonid Andreyev

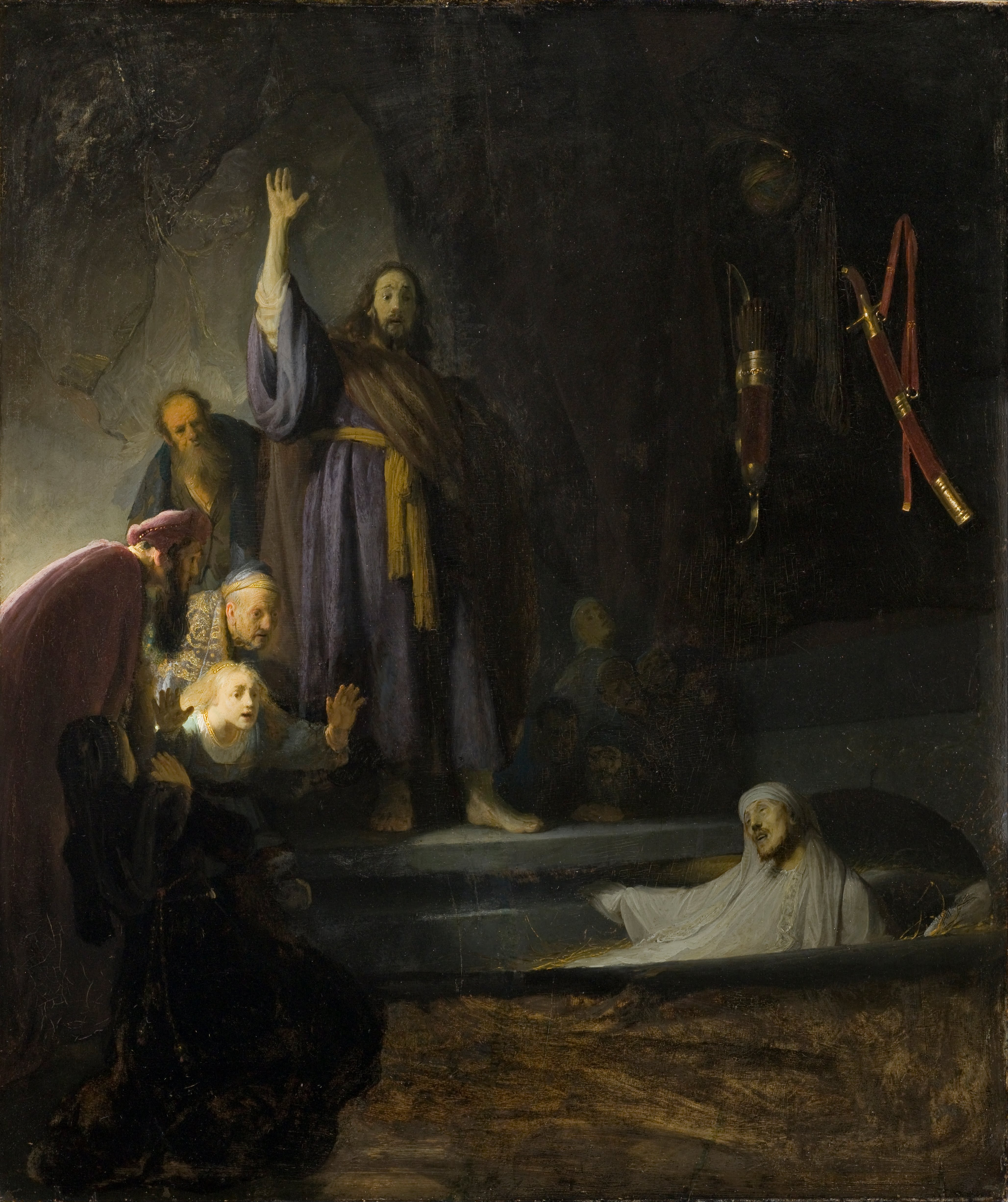
The Raising of Lazarus (1630–1632), by Rembrandt.

"Lazarus" is a short story by Russian author Leonid Andreyev, published in 1906. Instead of confirming the traditional interpretation of the Biblical story as the triumph of life over death, Andreyev's "Lazarus" shows the opposite—the titular character infects those around him with a cosmic indifference to life.

== Plot summary ==
The story begins with Lazarus's miraculous return from the dead, initially celebrated by friends and family. However, as time passes, his joyful demeanor fades, replaced by a grave silence and unsettling changes in his appearance. During a gathering, a guest's question about his experience in death leads to discomfort, and Lazarus's cold gaze instills dread among the guests, causing some to descend into madness.

Lazarus becomes isolated and neglected, shunned by those who once loved him, including his sisters Mary and Martha. His home falls into disrepair, and he wears tattered garments, symbolizing his lost vitality. Visitors who encounter him are left with a profound sense of emptiness and despair.

In section IV, the story then introduces Aurelius, a renowned sculptor from Rome, who is drawn to Lazarus out of curiosity and a desire to understand the nature of life and death. Aurelius believes that he can help Lazarus reconnect with the beauty of life. When he meets Lazarus, he is struck by the man's appearance and the darkness that seems to envelop him. Despite the initial lightheartedness of their conversation, Aurelius soon realizes that the encounter has a profound impact on him.

Upon returning to Rome, Aurelius attempts to create a masterpiece that captures the essence of beauty he believes he has discovered in Lazarus. However, his artistic endeavors result in a grotesque creation that reflects his inner turmoil and the emptiness he now feels. The once-great sculptor is left in despair, unable to find inspiration or joy in his art, ultimately leading him to a state of indifference toward beauty and life itself.

In the final sections (V and VI) of Leonid Andreyev's "Lazarus", the eponymous protagonist is summoned to Rome by Emperor Augustus, where he is met with fear rather than admiration. His presence drains the joy from those he encounters, leading to tragic transformations in their lives. The Emperor, confident in his power, attempts to engage with Lazarus, but he quickly realizes the depth of despair and emptiness that Lazarus embodies. In a moment of confrontation, Augustus gazes into Lazarus's eyes and is overwhelmed by the horror of the Infinite, leading to a vision of the destruction of Rome and the futility of life. Despite this encounter, Augustus manages to reclaim his will to live, deciding to spare Lazarus's life but ordering his eyes to be burned out to prevent further harm.

Lazarus returns to the desert, now blind and abandoned, embodying the weight of his cursed knowledge. He sits alone, groping for the sun as it sets, his dark silhouette resembling a cross against the crimson sky. The story concludes with Lazarus's tragic existence, marked by isolation and the burden of understanding the depths of life and death.

== Themes ==
Rather than focusing on the circumstances surrounding Jesus's restoration of Lazarus to life, Andreyev creates a vivid and starkly pessimistic account of the consequences of an event usually cast as miraculous. Lazarus, it transpires, has been irrevocably altered by the experience of death.

According to the Russian naturalist, Lazarus found only coldness and darkness in the tomb; death meant bodily decay and a cruel severance from life and the living. Such is the story of death as told by the physical senses. Holding tight to these material facts, Andreyev imagines the arisen Lazarus, under the handicap of partial decay, forced into an existence for which he is thus maladjusted. Not even his mental faculties have escaped injury: his interest in life and his awareness of it have withered—a sorrier state than that of death itself.

The story examines the complexities of life after death, questioning what it truly means to be resurrected. Lazarus's return is not a joyous occasion but rather a source of horror, suggesting that resurrection may come with profound psychological and existential consequences. The inquiry into Lazarus's experiences can be seen as a metaphor for humanity's desire to understand death. However, the knowledge that Lazarus possesses becomes a burden, leading to despair and madness for those who seek it. According to Henry T. Schnittkind, "Lazarus" is a story which depicts the misery of knowing the Unknowable.

This theme suggests that some truths about existence may be too heavy for the living to bear, which is reminiscent of T. S. Eliot's quote in Burnt Norton: "Human kind cannot bear very much reality".

== See also ==
- Philosophical pessimism
- H. P. Lovecraft
