= Amazons! =

Fantasy anthology edited by Jessica Amanda Salmonson

- Cover of the first edition
- Editor: Jessica Amanda Salmonson
- Cover artist: Michael Whelan
- Language: English
- Genre: Fantasy
- Publisher: DAW Books
- Publication date: 1979
- Publication place: United States
- Media type: Print (paperback)
- Pages: 206
- ISBN: 0-87997-503-2
- OCLC: 5951403
- Followed by: Amazons II

Amazons! is an anthology of fantasy stories, edited by Jessica Amanda Salmonson, with a cover and frontispiece by Michael Whelan. It was first published in paperback by DAW Books in December 1979, and was the first significant fantasy anthology of works featuring female protagonists by (mostly) female authors. It received the 1980 World Fantasy Award for Best Anthology. A follow-up anthology, Amazons II, was released in 1982. The story "Agbewe's Sword" by Charles R. Saunders was adapted into the 1986 film Amazons.

== Summary ==
The book collects 14 short stories, novelettes and poems by various fantasy authors, with an introduction by Salmonson and an essay on additional reading by Salmonson and Susan Wood.

== Contents ==
- "Amazons" (poem) (Melanie Kaye)
- "Introduction: Our Amazon Heritage" (Jessica Amanda Salmonson)
- "The Dreamstone" (C. J. Cherryh)
- "Wolves of Nakesht" (Janrae Frank)
- "Woman of the White Waste" (T. J. Morgan)
- "The Death of Augusta" (poem) (Emily Brontë; edited by Joanna Russ)
- "Morrien's Bitch" (Janet Fox)
- "Agbewe's Sword" (Charles R. Saunders)
- "Jane Saint's Travails (Part One)" (Josephine Saxton)
- "The Sorrows of Witches" (Margaret St. Clair)
- "Falcon Blood" (Andre Norton)
- "The Rape Patrol" (Michele Belling)
- "Bones for Dulath" (Megan Lindholm)
- "Northern Chess" (Tanith Lee)
- "The Woman Who Loved the Moon" (Elizabeth A. Lynn)
- "Additional Reading" (Jessica Amanda Salmonson and Susan Wood)

== Awards ==
The collection won the 1980 World Fantasy Award for Best Anthology/Collection, placed fourth in the 1980 Locus Poll Award for Best Anthology, and was nominated for both the 1980 and 1981 Balrog Award for Collection/Anthology.
