= Jessica Amanda Salmonson =

American writer

- Born: January 6, 1950 (age 76); Seattle, Washington, U.S.
- Occupations: fantasy writer; editor; critic
- Writing career
- Genres: Fantasy, Horror

Jessica Amanda Salmonson (born January 6, 1950) is an American author and editor of fantasy and horror fiction and poetry. She lives on Puget Sound with her partner, the artist and editor Rhonda Boothe.

== Writing career ==
=== Fiction ===
Salmonson is the author of the Tomoe Gozen trilogy, a fantasy version of the tale of the historical female samurai Tomoe Gozen. Her other novels are The Swordswoman, Ou Lu Khen and the Beautiful Madwoman, an Asian fantasy, and a modern horror novel, Anthony Shriek.

Her short story collections include A Silver Thread of Madness; Mystic Women; John Collier and Fredric Brown Went Quarreling Through My Head; The Deep Museum: Ghost Stories of a Melancholic; and The Dark Tales. Poetry collections include Horn of Tara and The Ghost Garden.

Her papers (1973-1993) are archived in the collection of the University of Oregon.

=== Nonfiction ===
Salmonson has written a number of nonfiction books. Notable is The Encyclopedia of Amazons, an exhaustive alphabetical reference book of worldwide history and legends about women warriors. Other works of nonfiction include Wisewomen and Boggy-Boos: A Dictionary of Lesbian Fairy Lore (1992) (coedited with Jules Remedios Faye), and Miniature Vegetables (1994).

In addition to the books noted, she contributed a number of essays, primarily concerning gender and feminism in science fiction, to fanzines in the 1970s.

=== Editor ===
Salmonson began her editorial career in 1973 editing the small-press magazine The Literary Magazine of Fantasy & Terror (under the name Amos Salmonson). She continued as editor (under her name Jessica Amanda Salmonson) when magazine was revived under the shortened name Fantasy and Terror in 1984, and continued until the final issue in 1996. At the same time, she served as editor of Fantasy Macabre from 1985 to 1996. The magazine was subtitled "Beauty plus strangeness equals terror."

Salmonson was the editor of the anthologies Amazons! and Amazons II; Heroic Visions and Heroic Visions II; Tales by Moonlight and Tales by Moonlight II; and What Did Miss Darrington See: An Anthology of Feminist Supernatural Stories.

She has also edited a series of single-author collections of ghost stories and weird tales, many of them of historical significance to genre literature, including volumes by Marjorie Bowen, Alice Brown, Thomas Burke, Olivia Howard Dunbar, Hildegarde Hawthorne, Julian Hawthorne, Augustus Jessopp, Sarah Orne Jewett, Anna Nicholas, Fitz-James O'Brien, Vincent O'Sullivan, Georgia Wood Pangborn, Harriet Prescott Spofford, Mary Heaton Vorse, and Jerome K. Jerome.

== Awards ==
- 1980: World Fantasy Award for best collection, Amazons! (1979)
- 1990: Lambda Literary Award for Lesbian Science Fiction/Fantasy, What Did Miss Darrington See?: An Anthology of Feminist Supernatural Fiction
- 2001: Writer Guest of Honor at World Horror Convention

== Selected bibliography ==
=== Novels ===
==== Tomoe Gozen trilogy ====
- Tomoe Gozen (Ace Books, 1981); revised as The Disfavored Hero (Pacific Warriors 1999; Open Road Media e-book, 2015)
- The Golden Naginata (Ace Books, 1982; Open Road Media e-book, 2015)
- Thousand Shrine Warrior (Ace Books, 1984; Open Road Media e-book, 2015)

==== Other novels ====
- The Swordswoman (Ace Books 1982)
- Ou Lu Khen and the Beautiful Madwoman (Ace Books, 1985)
- Anthony Shriek, His Doleful Adventures; or, Lovers of Another Realm (Dell Abyss, 1992; hardcover from Centipede Press, 2017)
- Namer of Beasts, Maker of Souls: The Gnostic/Cabbalistic Biography of Merlin (Duck's-foot Tree Productions e-book, 2011)

=== Collections ===
- Tragedy of the Moisty Morning (Oregon: Angst World Library, 1978)
- Hag's Tapestry (Haunted Library, UK: 1986)
- A Silver Thread of Madness (Ace Books, 1989)
- John Collier and Fredric Brown Went Quarreling Through My Head (W. Paul Ganley/Weirdbook Press, 1989)
- Harmless Ghosts (Haunted Library, UK: 1990)
- Mystic Women: Their Ancient Tales and Legends Recounted by a Woman Inmate of the Calcutta Insane Asylum (Seattle: Street of Crocodiles 1991)
- The Mysterious Doom and Other Ghostly Tales of the Pacific Northwest (Seattle: Sasquatch Books 1992)
- The Eleventh Jaguarundi and Other Mysterious Persons (LaGrande, OR: Wordcraft of Oregon 1995; Duck's-foot Tree Productions e-book, 2011)
- Phantom Waters: Northwest Legends of Rivers, Lakes & Shores (Seattle: Sasquatch Books 1995)
- Mister Monkey and Other Sumerian Fables (Seattle: Tabula Rasa Press, 1995; Duck's-foot Tree Productions e-book, 2011)
- Twenty-one Epic Novels (Seattle: Tabula Rasa, 2002)
- The Dark Tales (Wales: Sarob Press 1991)
- Strange Miniatures from a Northwest Studio (Bremerton: Duck's-foot Tree Productions, 2001)
- The Deep Museum: Ghost Stories of a Melancholic (British Columbia: Ash-Tree Press 2003)
- The Complete Weird Epistles of Penelope Pettiweather, Ghost Hunter (Alchemy Press, UK, 2016)

=== Poetry ===
- The Black Crusader and Other Poems of Horror (Springfield, MO: W. D. Firestone, 1979)
- On the Shores of Eternity (Seattle: Duck's-Foot Tree Productions 1981)
- Feigned Death and Other Sorceries (Seattle: Duck's-Foot Tree, 1983)
- Innocent of Evil: Poems in Prose(Madison, WI: Dream House, 1984)
- The Ghost Garden (Liverpool: Dark Dreams Press, 1988)
- Sorceries and Sorrows: Early Poems (Polk City, IA: Chris Drumm Books, 1992)
- Songs of the Maenads (Seattle Duck's-Foot Tree and the Street of Crocodiles, 1992)
- Wisewomen and Boggy-Boos: A Dictionary of Lesbian Fairy Lore (1992) (with Jules Remedios Faye)
- The Horn of Tara (Seattle: Duck's-Foot Tree, 1995; Duck's-foot Tree Productions e-book, 2011)
- Lake of the Devil (Seattle: Duck's-Foot Tree, 1995)
- The Death Sonnets and Others (UK: Rainfall Books, 2015)
- Pets Given in Evidence of Old English Witchcraft and Other Bewitched Beings (Minneapolis: Sidecar Preservation Society, 2016)
- Daisy Zoo and Other Punk-Ass Nonsense (Bremerton: Duck's-foot Tree Productions, 2016)

=== Non-fiction ===
- The Encyclopedia of Amazons: Women Warriors from Antiquity to the Present Era (NY: Paragon House, 1991, ISBN 1-55778-420-5; Anchor Doubleday, 1992; Open Road Media, 2015)

=== Anthologies edited by ===
- Amazons! (NY: DAW Books, 1979)
- Amazons II (NY: DAW Books, 1982)
- Heroic Visions (NY: Ace Books, 1983)
- Tales by Moonlight (Chicago, IL: Robert T. Garcia, Publisher, 1983; NY: Tor Books, 1983)
- The Haunted Wherry and Other Rare Ghost Stories (Madison: Strange Company, 1985)
- Heroic Visions II (NY: Ace Books, 1986)
- Tales by Moonlight II (NY: Tor Books, 1989)
- What Did Miss Darrington See? (NY: The Feminist Press at CUNY, 1989)
- Wife or Spinster: Short Stories by 19th Century American Women (Maine: Yankee Books, 1991) with Charles Waugh

=== Collections edited by ===
- Faded Garden: The Collected Ghost Stories of Hildegarde Hawthorne (1985)
- The Supernatural Stories of Fitz-James O'Brien Volume One: Macabre Tales (NY: Doubleday, 1988)
- The Supernatural Stories of Fitz-James O'Brien Volume Two: Dream Tales and Fantasies (NY: Doubleday, 1988)
- From Out of the Past: The Indiana Ghost Stories of Anna Nicholas (Ghost Story Society, UK: 1992)
- Master of Fallen Years: Complete Supernatural Stories of Vincent O'Sullivan (Ghost Story Press, UK: 1995)
- The Rose of Death and Other Mysterious Delusions by Julian Hawthorne (British Columbia: Ash-Tree Press, 1997)
- The Shell of Sense: Collected Ghost Stories of Olivia Howard Dunbar (Uncasville, CT: R. H. Fawcett, 1997)
- Twilight and Other Supernatural Romances by Marjorie Bowen (Ash-Tree Press, 1998)
- Lady Ferry and Other Uncanny People by Sarah Orne Jewett (Ash-Tree Press, 1998)
- The Phantom Coach and Other Ghost Stories of an Antiquary by Augustus Jessopp (R. H. Fawcett, 1998)
- The Wind at Midnight by Georgia Wood Pangborn (Ash-Tree Press, 1999)
- The Moonstone Mass and Others by Harriet Prescott Spofford (Ash-Tree Press, 2000)
- The Golden Gong and Other Night-Pieces by Thomas Burke (Ash-Tree Press, 2001)
- Sinister Romance: Collected Ghost Stories by Mary Heaton Vorse (Ash-Tree Press, 2002)
- The Empire of Death and Other Strange Stories by Alice Brown (Ash-Tree Press, 2003)
- City of the Sea and Other Ghost Stories by Jerome K. Jerome (Ash-Tree Press, 2008)
- The Wondersmith and Others by Fitz-James O'Brien (Ash-Tree Press, 2008)
