= Zhytsen =

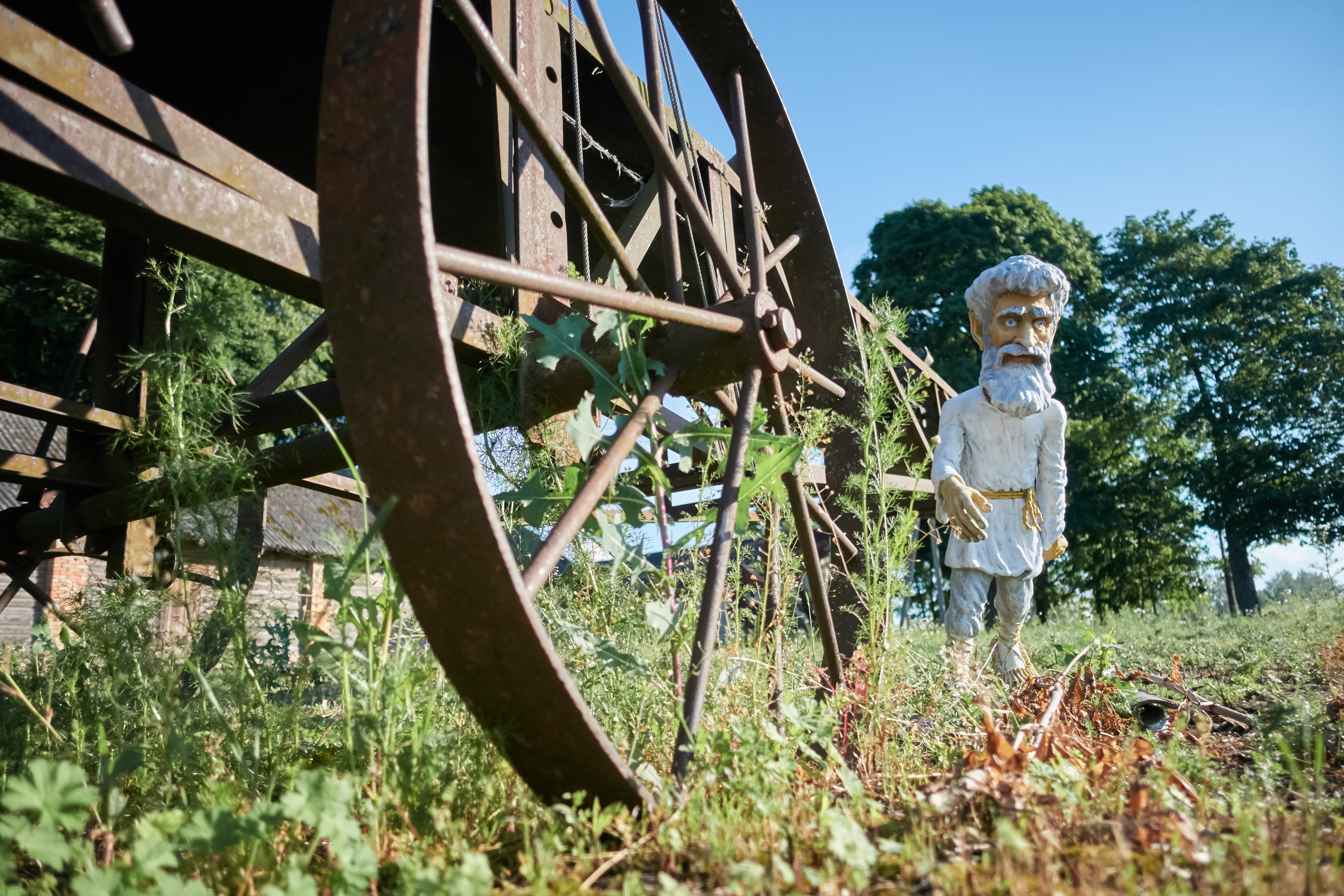
Sculpture of Zhytsen, by Belarusian sculptor Anton Shipitsa on the basis of illustrations of Valery Slauk

Zhytsen or Žycień (Belarusian: Жыцень) is a positive creature from Belarusian mythology said to live in fields. The name literally means "rye creature", from Belarusian жыта, "rye".

== Description ==
Zhyten is often called a spirit of wealth and wellbeing. It is believed that Zhytsen contributes to good ripening of crops and vegetables, and accordingly, Zhyten is considered the caretaker of good harvests.

Zhytsen walks through the fields and ensures that crops there are well reaped. It is believed in Belarusian folklore that if Zhytsen finds some left ears of grain, it binds them in sheaves and brings to the fields of more diligent farmers.

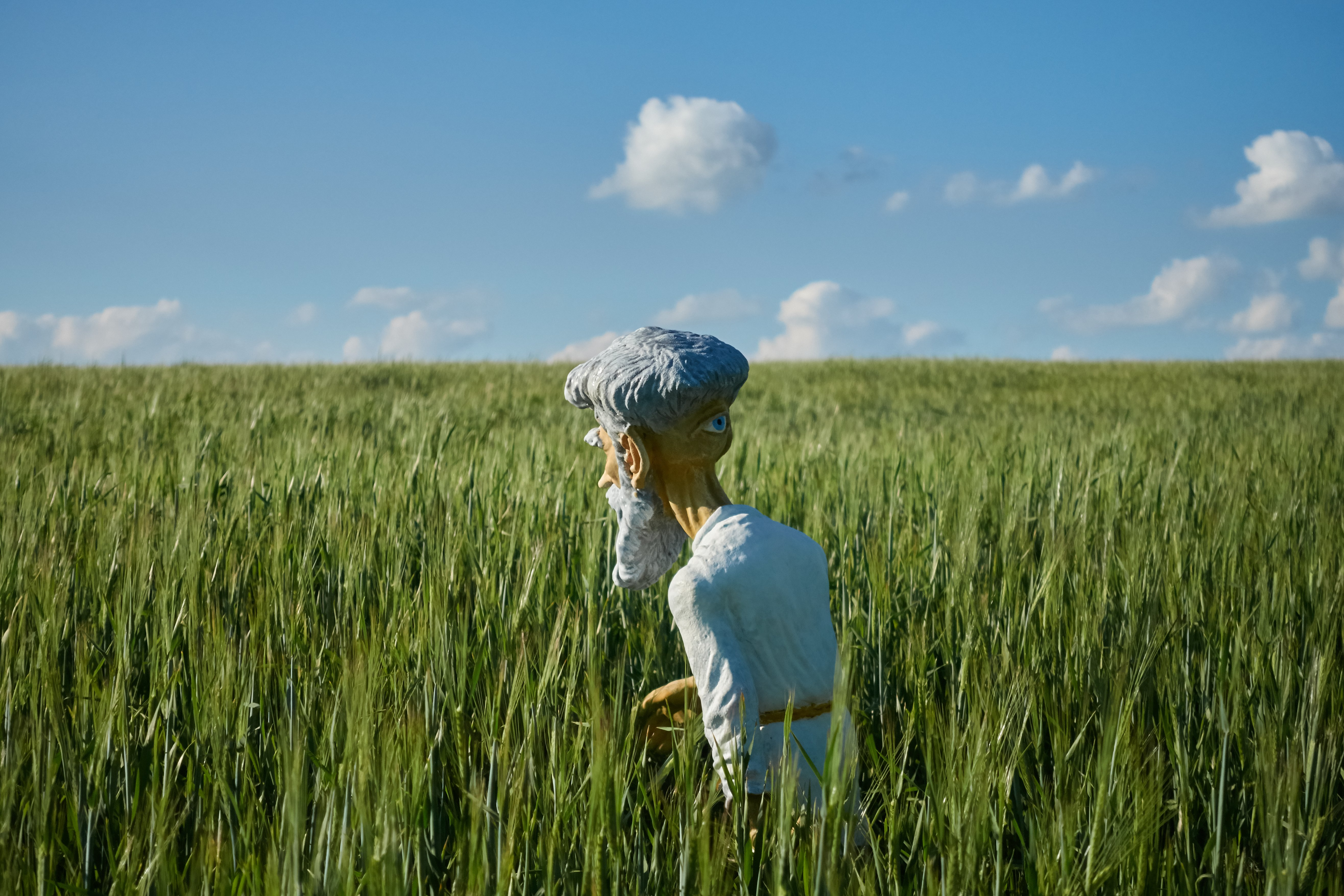

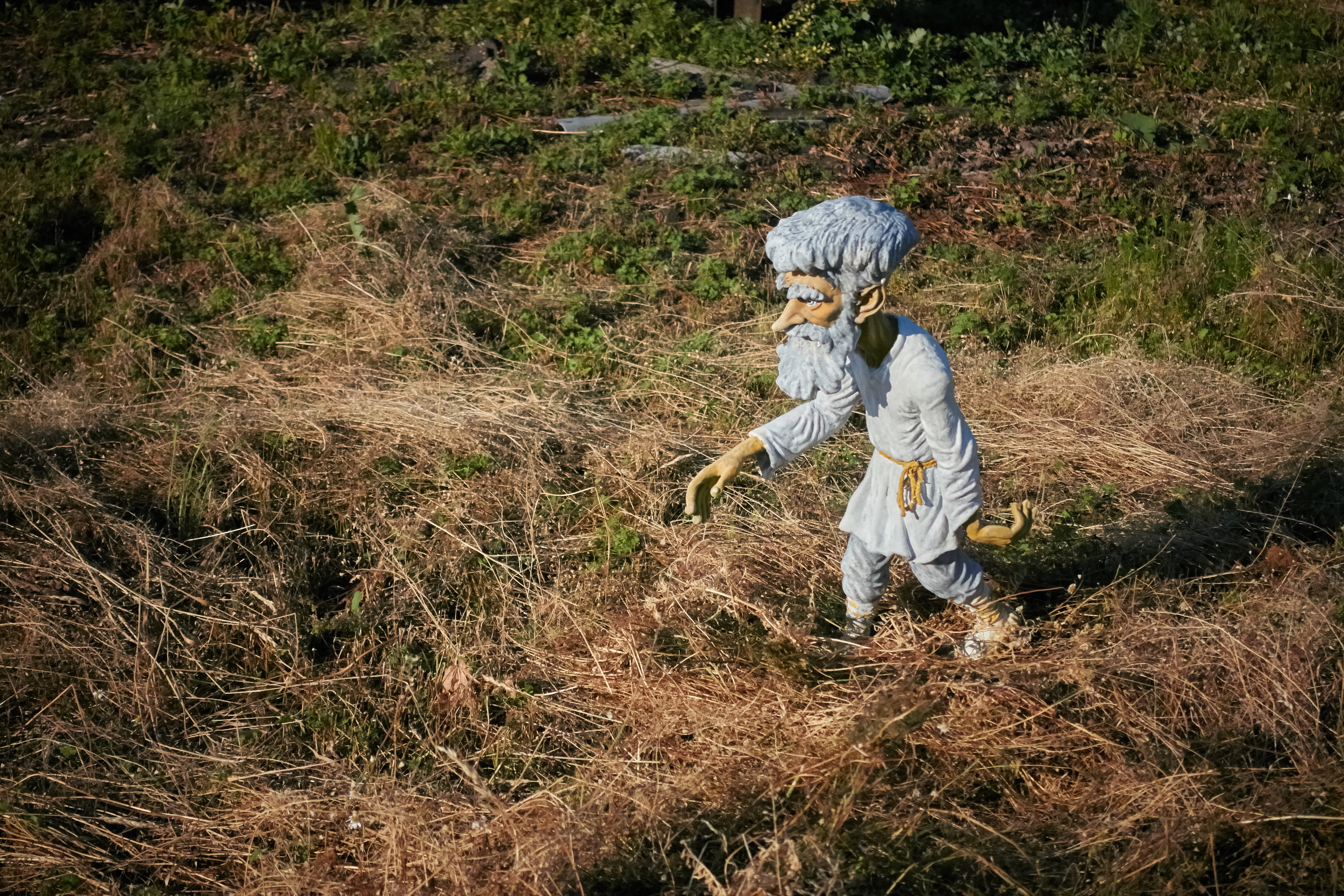

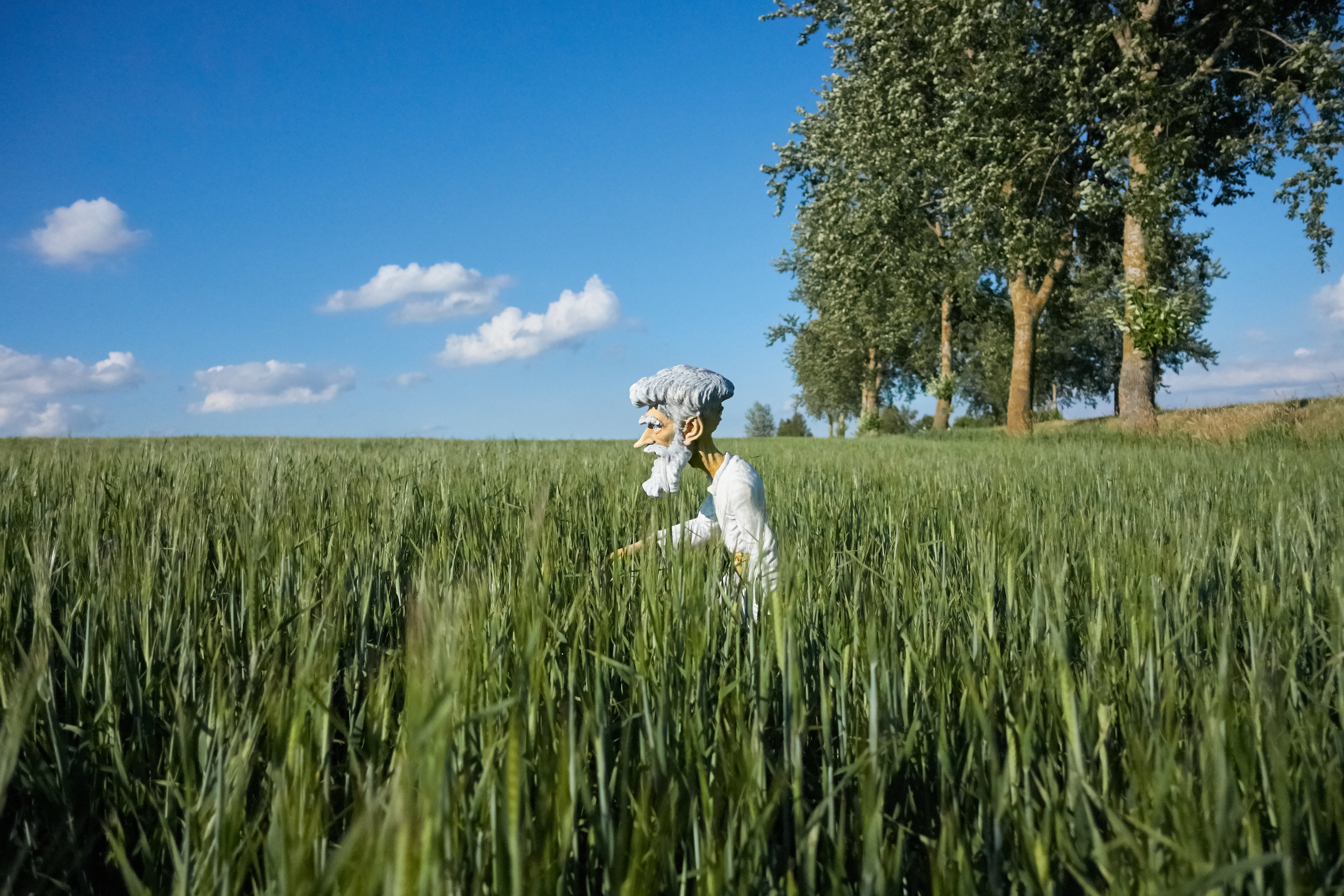

== See also ==
- Damavik
- Dzedka
- Lazavik
- Shatans
- Younik
- Zheuzhyk
- Zlydzens
