= Zheuzhyk =

Belarusian mythological creature

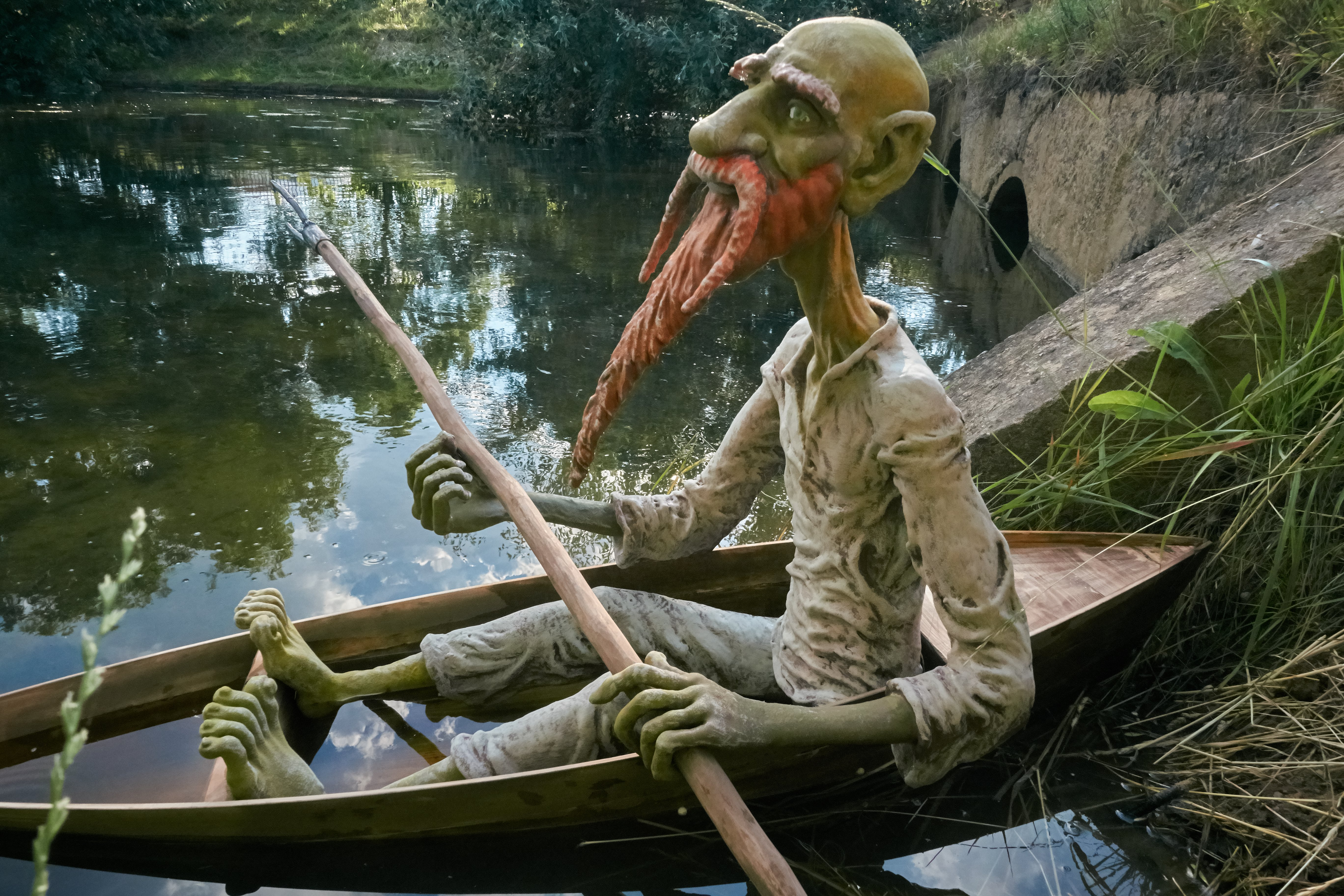
- Sculpture of Zheuzhyk, by Belarusian sculptor Anton Shipitsa on the basis of illustrations of Valery Slauk

Creature information
- Folklore: Belarusian folklore

Origin
- Country: Belarus
- Habitat: Lakes and rivers

Zheuzhyk (Belarusian: Жэўжык) is a creature of Belarusian mythology. It is considered to be a good creature that lives deeply in the lake bed. Zheuzhyk is considered to be the guardian of rivers and lakes of Belarus.

== Description ==
In Belarusian folklore Zheuzhyk is described as a thin old man with a long red beard, long and thin arms and legs.

== Mode of life ==
As it is said in Belarusian myths, during a day Zheuzhyk swims underwater, and at night Zheuzhyk slowly swims round its possession on boat, dispersing the waves. There is a belief, that is somebody gets into a trouble on water, Zheuzhyk will surely come to rescue. Zheuzhyk is so strong that it may even stop the wind and the storm.

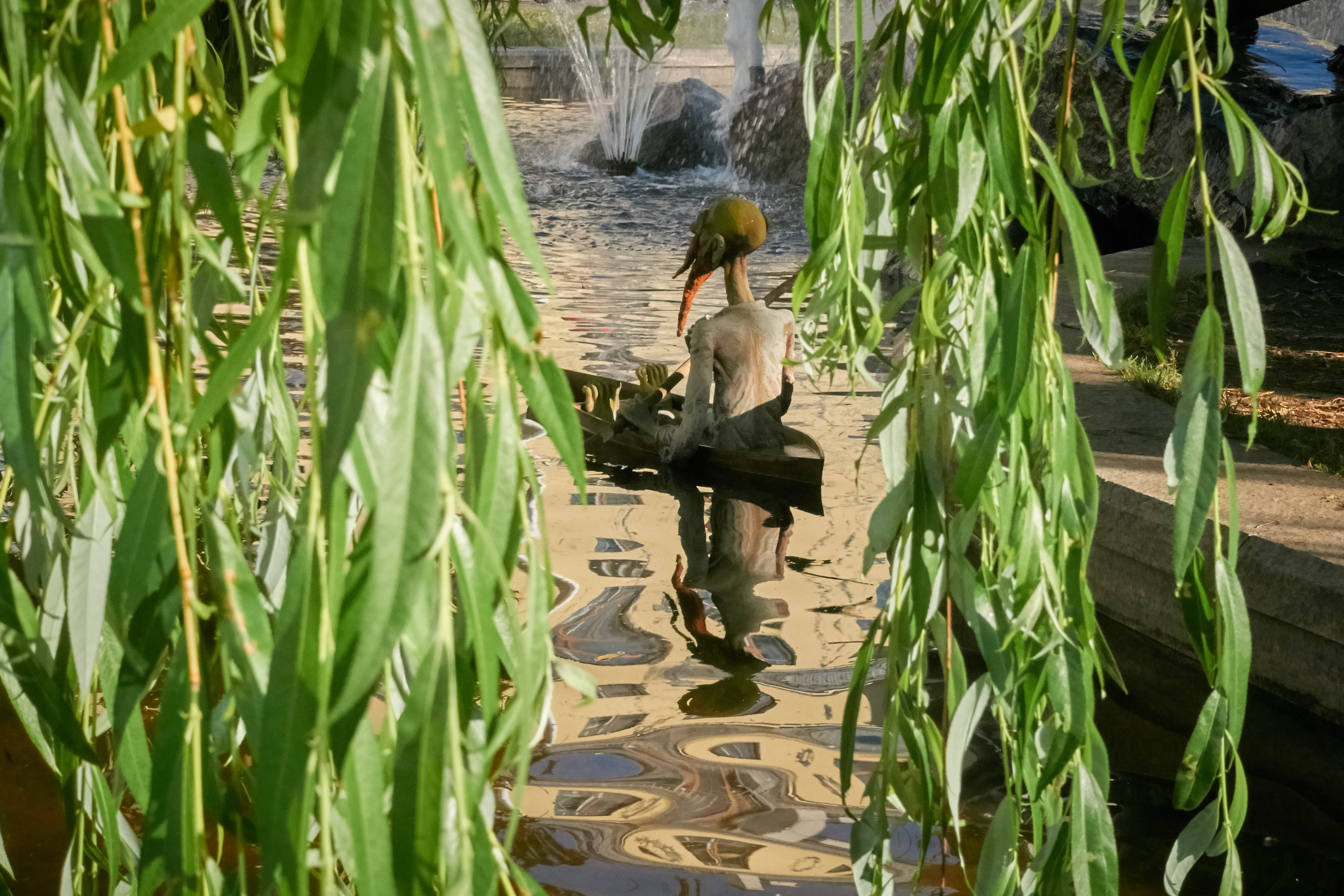

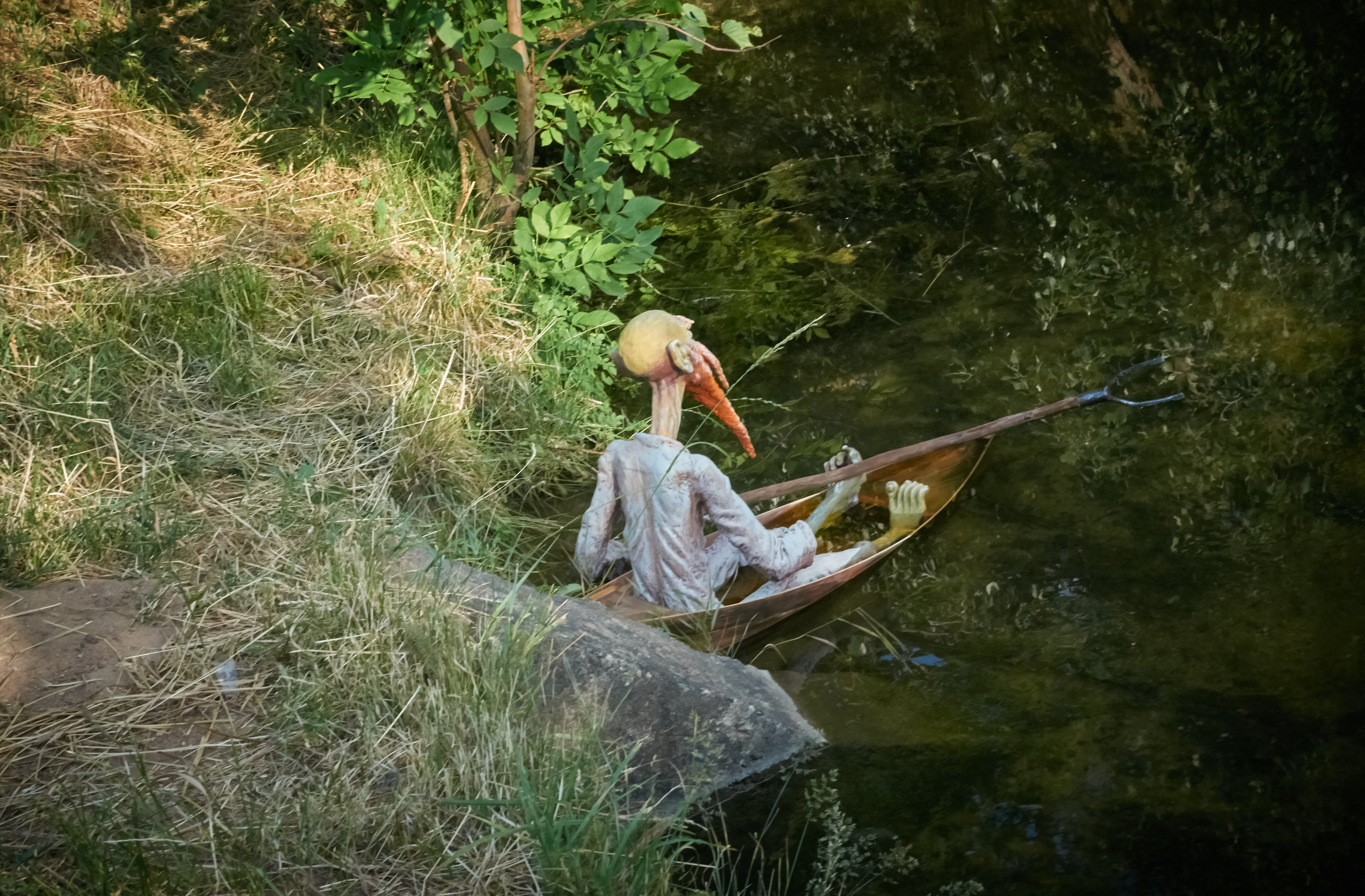

== See also ==
- Damavik
- Dzedka
- Lazavik
- Shatans
- Younik
- Zhytsen
- Zlydzens
