= Komi mythology =

Komi mythology is the traditional mythology of the Komi peoples of northern Russia.

== Gods and spirits ==
- En (Ен): "Strength". The good creator god, and the enemy of Kul. He took the form of a swan.
- Kul' or Omöl' (Куль or Омӧль): "Weakness". A god of water and of the dead, and the evil creator god. He took the form of a grebe.
- Vasa (Васа): Another water spirit. Like Kul, he could be malicious and had to be appeased by throwing bread, a stick, cakes or tobacco into the water. He was the friend of millers.
- Olys' or Olysya (Олысь or Олыся): A hearth spirit, the equivalent of the Russian domovoi. Under the name Rynyshsa (Рынышса) he is a water spirit associated with baths, appearing as a little hunchbacked old man with a white beard.
- Aika (Айка): "Father" or "Parent". A spirit who protects a specific place. They became enemies of Stephen of Perm.
- Peludi-Aika (Пелуди-Айка): "Father Cornflower". A spirit who forbade peasants to leave the house on 20 July. If they disobeyed, their corn was ravaged.
- Pyvsyan'sa (Пывсяньса): Master of the bath-house, the equivalent of the Russian bannik. He appears as a little man in a red hat with fiery eyes.
- Voipel' (Войпель): God of the cold north wind and of the night. His name means "North/Midnight Wind".
- Vörsa (Вöрса): Spirit of the forest, the equivalent of the Russian leshy. Each forest has its own Vörsa. Hunters offered furs, bread and salt or tobacco to him in the hope he would help them catch game.

== Creation myth ==
A duck egg gave birth to En and Omöl, the spirits of good and evil respectively. En took the form of a swan, Omöl that of a grebe. They rose from the bottom of the primordial ocean to create the world.

== Soul ==
In Komi religious belief the human soul (лов, "lov") had a double (орт, "ort", or орд, "ord"). The ort is born with each human being and gives a premonition of death either to the person who is to die or to one of their family.

== Underworld ==
The land of the dead was usually thought to be far to the north of the living, beyond mountains, rivers and forests. The Komi equivalent of the Styx (the river of the underworld in Greek mythology) was "Syr Yu" (Сыр Ю), "River of Pitch". Dead souls were assigned various means of crossing the river, according to their sins in this world: an iron bridge, a shaky beam, a thin pole or a cobweb. After this the dead had to climb a huge slippery mountain. This was only possible if the person had led a good life and had strong fingernails. Traditionally, the Komis kept their fingernail clippings so they could be buried with them for use in the afterlife.

== Shamans and sorcerers ==
The Komis had shamans and believed in sorcerers and witches. The most notorious witch in Komi folklore is Yoma (or Yoma-Baba).

== Video games ==
- Black Book
- The Mooseman

== See also ==
- Finnic mythology
- Permian bronze casts
- Slavic mythology
