= Miškinis =

- Lithuanian surname
- m.: Miškinis
- f.: (unmarried): Miškinytė
- f.: (married): Miškinienė
- Origin: Lithuanized Mishkin

Miškinis is a Lithuanian language family name. It may refer to:

- Albertas Miškinis (born 1938), Lithuanian politician
- Janina Sankutė-Miškinienė, a Lithuanian Righteous Among the Nations
- Kęstas Miškinis, Lithuanian sports scientist and educator
- Vytautas Miškinis (born 1954), Lithuanian music composer and professor

== See also ==
- Mishkin
- Myshkin
