= Zlydzens =

Hazardous creatures in Belarusian mythology

Zlydzens (Belarusian : Злыдні, and Ukrainian : Злидні) are small, hunchbacked, hazardous creatures in Belarusian and Ukrainian mythology associated with gremlins. These mythological characters often live under the masonry stove.

== Description ==
In the fairy-tales and myths of Belarusian nation Zlydzens are usually described as small, humpbacked and nasty creatures that remind one of cats and dogs at the same time. They often wear big boots and hats with earflaps.

== Mode of life ==
These creatures are engaged in all sorts of harmful and damaging activities and ruin everything around them, quickly trying to make a mess. In Belarusian folklore it is said that Zlydzens are sometimes drawn to the homes of individuals who want to become rich quickly and of greedy owners.

Zlydzens play their nasty tricks in groups because, like many other small and harmful creatures, they are cowards and are afraid to act alone. When the owner leaves the house, Zlydzens emerge from their shelter and make a mess. They damage utensils, pour milk from pitchers; pans fly around the house. Cries of Zlydzens are heard all around the village. Zlydzens are always engaged in all sorts of harmful and damaging activities, and are constantly making a mess.

== Modern use ==
In Ukrainian language жити в злиднях (transliteration: zhyty v zlydnyakh; literal translation: “to live in zlydni”) is a common phrase meaning “to live in poverty.”

== See also ==
- Boggart
- Damavik
- Dzedka
- Gremlin
- Lazavik
- Poltergeist
- Shatans
- Younik
- Zheuzhyk
- Zhytsen
