= Dzedka =

Legendary creature from the Belarusian mythology

Dzedka (Belarusian: Дзедка, Russian: Кладенец, Polish: Skarbnik) is a character of Belarusian mythology. Dzedka is a good mythological creature. It is considered to be the symbol of richness and fortune companion.

== Description ==
Dzedka is described as an old man with long red beard and red eyes. Dzedka wears simple clothes and looks like a beggar with a bag.

== Mode of life ==
According to Belarusian folk beliefs, in the daytime Dzedka walks around the roads and fields. When a person meets Dzedka, prior to noticing it, this person falls asleep. When the person wakes up, he or she discovers a desired sum of money.

If rich, but unhappy people meet Dzedka, it shows such people in a dream what they need to do to become happy.

== See also ==
- Damavik
- Lazavik
- Shatans
- Younik
- Zheuzhyk
- Zhytsen
- Zlydzens
