= Lazavik =

Belarusian mythology creature

Lazavik (Belarusian: Лазавік) is a creature of Belarusian mythology.

== Description ==
Lazavik is a benevolent Belarusian mythological character that lives amid the vine bushes ("laza" in Belarusian language). In Belarusian folk tales, Lazavik is described as a small creature with one eye, a long beard, and a very long whip in his hand. Belarusian people used to say that when Lazavik walks through the marshland, his only eye shines like a light.

== Mode of life ==
The creature Lazavik prefers to stay unnoticed by people and constantly tries to hide in its house. The house of Lazavik is small with no windows and no doors. In fact, Lazavik is the guardian of Belarusian marshes. It is believed that Lazavik dies if its marshes are drained. With its whip, Lazavik drives away small, harmful, and noisy Lozniks through the vine bushes.

== See also ==
- Damavik
- Dzedka
- Shatans
- Younik
- Zheuzhyk
- Zhytsen
- Zlydzens
