= Leshy =

Forest spirit in Slavic mythology

- Forests, wildlife, hunting
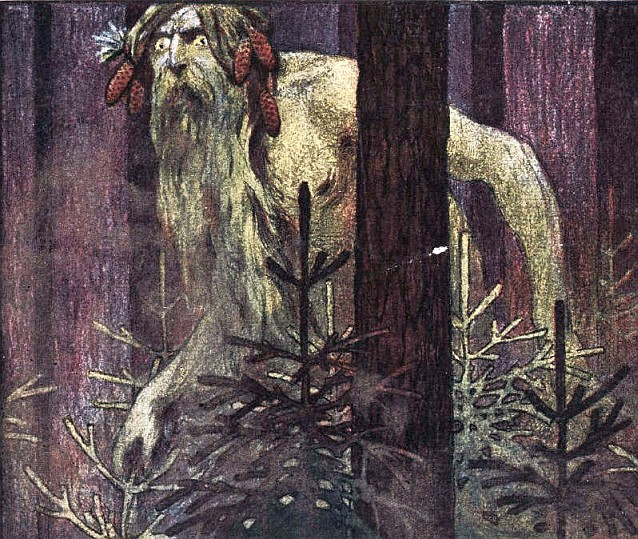
- An illustration by Ivan Bilibin, 1906
- Abode: Forests

Leshy (Note: Russian: леший, romanized: leshiy; literally, '[he] from the forest'.) is a tutelary deity of the forest in pagan Slavic mythology. As Leshy rules over the forest and hunting, he may be related to the Slavic god Porewit.

Leshy often appears as a masculine humanoid, and possesses an ability to disguise himself as any person, including changing in size and stature. In some accounts, Leshy is described as having a wife (Leshachikha, Leszachka, Lesovikha, and sometimes the Kikimora of the swamp) and children (leshonki, leszonky).

Leshy is known to misguide wanderers and abduct young ones, traits he shares with the notorious Chort, the "Black One" or "Devil", thus leading some to perceive him as a malevolent entity. Leshy's attitude towards humans can vary, depending on how they interact with the forest and their overall behavior. Leshy is said to possess the power to whisk away children who were mistreated by their kin, especially their parents, to the ethereal realm of forest-dwelling folk. In this way, Leshy is also often considered to be temperamental, with a similar disposition to that of a fairy.

== Names and etymology ==
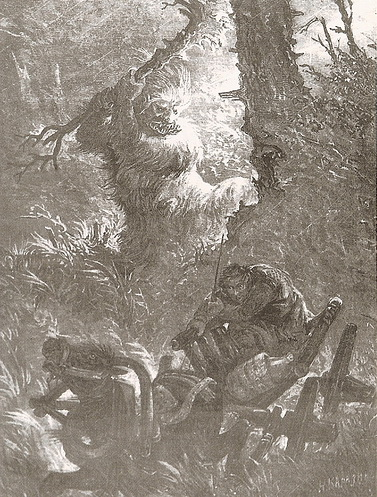
Drawing by Ivan Yizhakevych, Niva magazine, 1904

The word Leshy and its most common variants are derived from the Common Slavic root *lěsъ, meaning "forest" or "woodland", combined with various suffixes. Thus, the name literally translates to "[he] from the forest" or "woodland one".

Leshy is known by a variety of names and spellings, primarily reflecting the specific type of forest he inhabits.

Main name variations:

- Borovoy (Russian: Боровой, Polish: Borowy) "[one] of the pine barrens"
- Gayevoy (Russian: Гаевой, Polish: Gajowy) "[one] of the grove"
- Leshak (Russian: Лешак, Serbo-Croatian: Lešak, Лешак)
- Leshy (Russian: Леший, Belarusian: Лешы, Polish: Leszy, Serbo-Croatian: Lešij, Лешиј) "[one] of the deciduous forests"
- Lesnik (Russian: Лесник, Polish: Leśnik, Bulgarian: Лесник, Serbo-Croatian: Lesnik, Лесник)
- Lesovik (Russian: Лесовик, Belarusian: Лесавік, Ukrainian: Лісовик, Serbo-Croatian: Lesovik, Лесовик)
- Lesovoy (Russian: Лесовой, Serbo-Croatian: Lesovoj, Лесовој)
- Lesun (Russian: Лесун, Belarusian: Лясун, Ukrainian: Лісун)

== Appearance ==
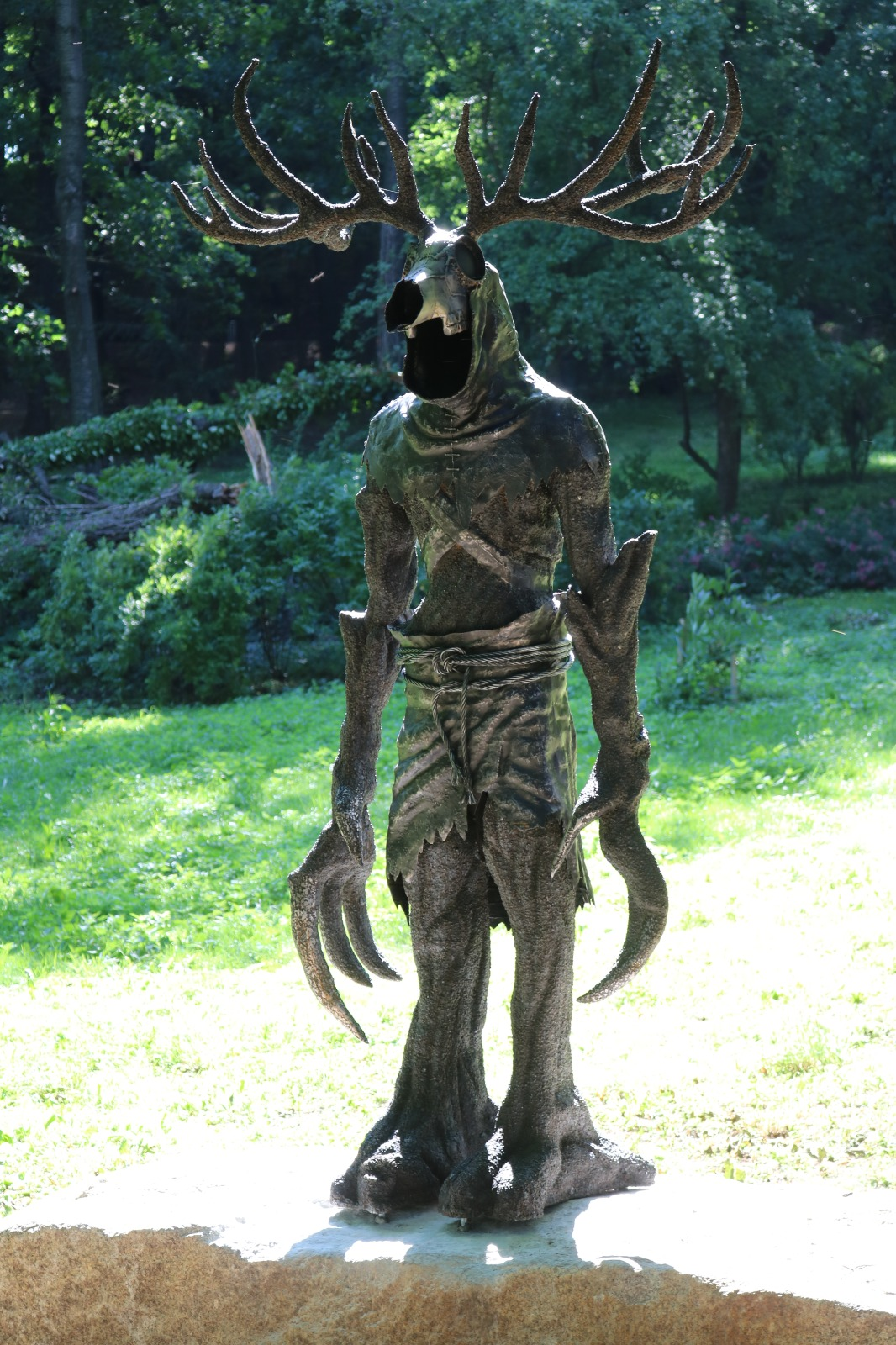
Leshy statue in Bolków, southwest Poland

The depiction of Leshy in Russian folklore reflects his supernatural essence and his strong bond with the forest. Being the embodiment of the forest, he can manifest in various forms associated with it. Leshy is a multifaceted entity, a fusion of different elements: animal, plant, human, whirlwind, and formless spirit. In his stories, Leshy may not be explicitly described, as his form is often elusive, and the storyteller may even fear the consequences of vividly depicting such an "unclean force" (something from the Otherworld, beyond the limits of ordered reality).

In ancient tales, Leshy is depicted as a phytoanthropomorphic being (part plant, part human), with a distinct leaning towards either human or plant-like characteristics. He is often portrayed as a plant, such as a revered tree (a pine, spruce, birch, oak, or aspen), a bush, a stump, a leaf, or even a mushroom. Leshy may also take on a more human form with woodland traits, such as long, tangled green hair resembling tree branches, a beard made of lichen, and clothing and skin the color and texture of bark. In some cases, the plant-like features are reduced to accessories, such as a club or wand, a green beard, or green eyes and clothing. Leshy is said to possess the ability to whip humans with twigs, create noise and humming sounds, and even cause trees to split. In certain tales, Leshy is seen as the embodiment of the entire forest, filling his whole wood with his presence.

In the realm of folklore, Leshy assumes myriad forms, some of which are zooanthropomorphic creatures. He may take on the forms of wild and domestic animals, such as: bears, wolves, owls, demonic hares, frogs, crows, magpies, dogs, black cats, horses, and black goats. Leshy is also portrayed as a half-man half-goat, with black fur covering his body, small curved horns, hooves, long hair and a beard. Alternatively, he can appear as a human with animalistic features, including thick hair, animal pelts as clothes, claws, hooves, a tail, and wings. Leshy is often accompanied by an animal companion, such as a black dog or a small black goat.

Today, the dominant perception of Leshy is more anthropomorphic. He can vary in size from a giant to an average-sized man. Leshy is typically depicted with long, disheveled or thinning hair in shades of gray, green, or red and a matching beard. At times, he is imagined with a face as white as birch bark. His eyes can be green, unnaturally pale, white, lead-blue, brilliant, or dull, and they may appear bulging or fixed, with the right eye often larger than the left, or both larger than human eyes. Leshy may lack eyebrows and eyelashes, although he may also have bushy eyebrows. He is sometimes described as missing a nostril, right ear, or one eye, and may have a limp. According to some beliefs, Leshy has an upward-pointing head. In certain depictions, he is said to have blue blood, resulting in blue skin. Leshy is often characterized by a desire to conceal his face and avoid making eye contact with others. When sitting, he is said to cross his left leg over the right.

Some Belorussians believe that Leshy has a flat, long face, a long, wedge-shaped beard, one eye, and one backwards leg. The image of Leshy as an old man with a gray beard is widespread. Frequently, Leshy takes on the guise of a family member, friend, or someone familiar to the storyteller, and this trickery may only be exposed upon returning home, when it becomes apparent that the encounter took place in a completely different location. Leshy is also known to assume the appearance of a deceased individual.

Some imagine Leshy to be a colossal giant, easily crossing rivers in one stride. Conversely, others see him as a small person or merely average. In some beliefs, it is said that Leshy's height changes based on the surrounding vegetation, so he may be as tall as a tree or as short as a blade of grass. Other perspectives suggest that Leshy seems tall at a distance but appears ordinary or small when seen up close.

In the northern regions of Russia, forest-spirit type Leshy were categorized into different species based on their size, including those that acted as guardians of the forest, those that resembled mushrooms, and those that were akin to mosses.

Leshy is believed to possess incredible strength and weight, being so heavy that even a horse would have trouble pulling the cart he sat on. This supernatural being defied the laws of nature with his power, leaving a lasting impact on anyone who encountered him.

It is widely believed that Leshy dresses like an ordinary person. He may wear leather or fur clothing, an armyak, a woolen homemade caftan, a siberka, clothing similar to a balaklava or a cassock with wide sleeves. His headgear is diverse: a wide-brimmed hat, a pointed cap, a patched-up scrap hat, etc. According to other beliefs, Leshy always has an uncovered head. Some tales state that Leshy is always belted, while others claim he never has a belt. Leshy typically wears enormous bast shoes. He is often caught weaving or digging in them, sitting on a stump under the moonlight. He also wears boots or goes barefoot. The left side of Leshy's clothing is fastened on the right (contrary to men's customary practice) with the right side sometimes tucked in, and his shoes are occasionally worn on the wrong feet. Leshy is often depicted as a forester or a soldier, usually with shiny buttons. In later folk tales, Leshy is dressed in modern clothing: a cap, boots or shoes, etc. Sometimes he wears attire atypical for the forest, such as a black suit. Overall, the color of Leshy's clothing varies: the colors of the forest are green and tawny, the colors of the otherworldly realm are white and black, and gray to represent a mixture. Also, he may wear red, associated with the color of blood, and blue. In his hands, Leshy might carry a whip, a lash, a cudgel, or a basket, indicating his connection to the forest and his patronage over animals. Leshy is often seen naked as well.

It was believed that a strong wind accompanies Leshy from ahead and behind, indicating the direction in which he is heading. This wind erases Leshy's tracks, explaining why nobody ever sees them (although in other stories, Leshy does leave traces). He may take on the form of a whirlwind, as well as a storm-cloud, rain, and fog. In this form, he raises dust on the road, tears off roofs, and topples trees. In some regions, the image of Leshy as a whirlwind was the most common, and in certain places, any kind of bad weather was identified with him.

Some believe that Leshy lacks a shadow or can turn invisible. It is said that to catch a glimpse of Leshy's true form, one must peer through the right ear of a horse or through a bridle while sitting between three harrows. Northern Russian folklore claims that Leshy wears an invisibility cap, but he can be revealed by using the plant known as Ivan's (or Adam's) head and stealing the cap from him. In certain tales, the only manifestation of Leshy is an inexplicable and sometimes collective fear that arises unexpectedly in the forest.

According to folklore, Leshy's sounds are both clamorous (often resonating throughout the entire woodland, deafening humans) and diverse (encompassing all sounds that can be heard or imagined in the forest): whistling, laughter, clapping, bellowing cries, singing, the voices of various animals, the howling of the wind, humming, crackling, and rustling. In this way, Leshy asserts his superiority over humans, expressing dissatisfaction, striving to scare, jest, and lead astray with false sounds. In numerous stories, Leshy speaks like a human. Often, his mimicry sounds like an echo. At times he is deliberately silent, and in some places it was even believed that he could not speak. One might hear the sounds of an individual leshy's wedding procession: the hoof beats of horses, tinkling bells, harmonicas, and singing.

== Lifestyle ==
Encounters with Leshy could take place anywhere in the forest, at any time. Leshy might be found in old dry trees (such as fir and willow), in hollows, in stumps, in upturned roots, in fallen logs, in woodland huts, in secret caves, and even underground. People inevitably get lost near Leshy's dwelling. Leshy's abode is protected by dense, impassable thickets and fallen trees which never freeze. Animals and birds are drawn there. Superstition says that forest creatures gather there before their death.

Often, Leshy is depicted as a solitary being, or as one of many diminutive forest spirits. In beliefs that feature many spirits, only one Leshy may inhabit each forest (large forests may be divided into sections, each with its own Leshy). In some tales, Leshy can gather together, living in families (a Leshy's wife is called a Leshachikha or a kidnapped maiden, and their children are either their own offspring or also kidnapped children). Leshy homes are covered in animal hides, and guarded by dogs, and they keep livestock; there are stories of Leshy leaders and kings; the head of the Leshy is referred to as the forest chief, the woodland king, the forest dweller, Musail-les, or the Honorable Leshy. Leshy can move along human roads, but in the forest, they have their own invisible paths that do not coincide with those of humans and are dangerous places to get lost. There was a belief that not all Leshy creatures are active throughout the day, but only during certain transitional hours: at night (especially at midnight), at dawn, at noon, or at an undefined "evil hour".

Observations of Leshy are also contradictory. Leshy are often depicted as having a majestic demeanor, yet they enjoy jesting, revelry, drinking, and playing cards. All the phenomena caused by gusts of wind in the forest might be Leshy activities: howling, the crackling of trees, and the rustling of leaves. The fallen trees and roofs torn off by hurricane winds in some regions are associated with the noisy weddings of Leshy, which they celebrate during the summer. Leshy enjoy hanging and swaying on tree branches, which is why in certain places they are called the "hangers down". They frequently sit on stumps, whittling wood.

Leshy the god might come into conflict with other, smaller spirits, as well as demons, water spirits, field spirits, and house spirits. Leshy takes care of the forest and protects it. He acts as the shepherd of all woodland creatures, depicted as an old man with a staff in his hand. He herds the animals, ensures their nourishment, and defends them from hunters and fires. Leshy governs the animals under his dominion as his own property. He may gamble them away in a game of cards to another forest spirit, which served as a mystical explanation for mass animal migrations such as squirrels and hares. Leshy is often portrayed as the patron of only one or a few species of wild animals, most commonly bears and wolves (Leshy can manifest as a white wolf – the pack leader).

A series of dates in the folk calendar are associated with Leshy. The presence of multiple Leshy was particularly common before Great Lent, Palm Sunday, and on the night of Ivan Kupala on June 24 (July 7). Leshy, like other spirits, celebrate the arrival of spring and Easter (the best gift for Leshy being an Easter egg). On George's Day in Spring, April 23 (May 6), or around St. Nicholas' Day, May 9 (May 22), shepherds could make agreements with Leshy. Hunters made agreements with Leshy on Easter and on the night of Ivan Kupala. On the night of Agafon the Monk, August 22 (September 4), Leshy would leave the forest and run through the villages, causing mischief in general. Peasants would guard sheaves of wheat from Leshy at night, walking around in a circle with a poker, as if enclosing the wheat with a fence. The Feast of the Cross, September 14 (September 27), was also considered a special day for Leshy, when they would drive forest animals into special places to play cards with them. Peasants would avoid going into the forest on this day so as not to stumble upon the gathering of Leshy.

On St. Erofey's Day, October 4 (October 17), Leshy would stop wandering through the forest, as they would sink into the ground for the winter. Leshy would become agitated, causing winds, digging up the earth, and scattering animals. It was considered dangerous to go into the forest on this day. Leshy would only reappear in the spring, when the snow began to melt. However, according to equally prevalent beliefs, Leshy would remain in the forest during the winter, causing blizzards. Like other unclean spirits, Leshy could manifest themselves during the Christmas season.

The origins of individual Leshy are unclear, with various beliefs suggesting they may be cursed individuals, children swapped by dark forces, or offspring of a devil and a witch. In folk Christianity, some believed that Leshy were either fallen angels or creations of the Devil who were cast down to earth. They may also be seen as descendants of Adam and Eve who were not acknowledged by God, or other individuals cursed by Him.

== Relationship with humans ==
The life of the Russian peasant was intimately intertwined with the forest, upon which their livelihoods hinged. Within the forest, every aspect of agricultural labor unfolded, with slash-and-burn techniques to create fields. Cattle grazed amidst the trees, while wood was harvested for both construction and warmth. People also harvested mushrooms and berries, fished, and extracted tar and charcoal. The forest served as a vital thoroughfare for roads, while also playing host to various pagan rituals. Despite active engagement with the forest and its proximity, it remained an enigmatic and perilous domain. It was regarded as an otherworldly realm, teeming with impure forces and beyond the grasp of human control.

The perception of Leshy as a forest guardian was ambiguous among the people. Leshy was considered a hostile and dangerous force, sometimes mistaken for a demon. He was often contrasted, however, with "real demons": his goal was not to harm humans for no reason, but to punish improper behavior in the forest or breaking societal rules. Leshy did not always harm people intentionally by playing tricks, albeit in a crude and malicious manner: he scared people with laughter and clapping, led them astray, hid their hats and baskets, made them sleep on anthills, forced them to climb trees, offered pine cones disguised as a drink, removed wagon wheels, and more. Leshy was also seen as a benevolent and just spirit, who would not harm humans without reason. He could help gather mushrooms or berries, show the way if asked, or take care of a lost child. Leshy determined the success of hunting and the prosperous grazing of livestock. Numerous mythological tales depict the struggle between humans and Leshy. This conflicting perspective is also reflected in the depiction of Leshy, alternating between a formidable and fearsome entity that could only be countered with prayers or magic (predominantly in traditional beliefs), and a humble folk demon who could be outwitted by a cunning peasant (primarily in fairy tales and similar accounts).

According to folk etiquette, when going to the forest, one should pray and ask permission to enter it from Leshy as the "master of the forest". It was also necessary to ask for Leshy's consent to pursue any activity in the forest. One should not, when going to the forest, say that they are going for a short time: it is not for them to decide, but for the forest. It is very dangerous to get a curse from a relative before going to the forest, as Leshy believes that "cursed people" are promised to him. Leshy does not like when those in the forest curse, make noise, sing, and whistle, as the forest is his prerogative and he may take offense and respond with his own destructive whistle. Do not respond to an unfamiliar voice: it may be Leshy.

Protecting the forest, Leshy can scatter axes, make trees invulnerable to woodcutters, and divert the shots of hunters. A person who stays overnight in a forest hut without being asked might become a target for Leshy to frighten with mysterious noises, maybe even violence. Making a fire or camping on a trail is ill-advised, especially at the crossroads, since a whole wedding or funeral procession of smaller spirits could run over anyone lingering there.

Leshy likes to warm himself by a human fire, but if he is angry he will extinguish it. If a person misbehaves in the forest, Leshy could frighten them with visions, make them sick, or even tickle them to death. If a person fell ill in the forest, Leshy was petitioned to help them recover. Sometimes Leshy could harm a person without any apparent reason.

=== Hunters ===
Hunters firmly believed that their hunting success was determined by Leshy, who was responsible for distributing the bounties of the forest to humans. To ensure a fruitful hunt, one could enter into a pact with Leshy (preferably during Easter or on the night of Ivan Kupala) by offering a gift, such as the first Easter egg or bread with salt (mixed with one's own hair or nails), or by making a sacrifice of one's own blood (from a finger or first catch). Another option was to write a contract in blood. The individual made a promise to abide by specific terms, such as refraining from taking more prey than allowed or refraining from hunting on designated days. This agreement must be kept confidential. By fulfilling his end of the bargain, Leshy would guide herds of animals towards the hunter's weapon or lead them into traps, ensuring accurate shots. Any individual who broke the agreement or revealed it would lose the protection of Leshy and may face severe consequences, such as illness or death. Striking a deal with Leshy meant surrendering oneself to his power and, as Christianity became more prevalent, it was often equated with selling one's soul to the Devil. In later beliefs, ending a contract with Leshy required placing a cross under one's heel, burying it in the ground, or shooting an ikon, holy gifts, or a cross with a gun and smearing the weapon with the resulting blood.

=== Shepherds ===
In many regions, cattle were commonly grazed in the forest, and in order to protect them from potential attacks and losses by predators, a shepherd would perform a ritual detour (known as a "free leave") at the beginning of the season, either on Egoriy, or on Nikola days. This involved circling the herd three times while carrying an ikon and other "magical" objects, reciting incantations. It was believed that any mistakes could anger Leshy, who was seen as the source of all misfortunes with the cattle in the forest, and he may seek revenge by harming the animals. Consequently, many individuals opted to negotiate with Leshy and choose a "divine" or "blessed' free leave instead of risking an "unblessed" free leave. This entailed the shepherd performing a ritual detour around the herd and sitting on a fallen birch tree or aspen stump on the same day or the day before, using a magical incantation to summon Leshy and presenting him with a gift such as an Easter egg, bread with salt, or even a couple of cows. The cow that was promised to Leshy would then either die or disappear in the forest during the season. In some traditions, Leshy was not summoned, but instead a present was left for him beneath a birch tree. The agreement with Leshy was made using a specific and secret formula, but no one was ever able to record the exact text. The shepherd made sure to leave a lock and key in the forest as part of the agreement. It was believed that Leshy would unlock it when the cows needed to graze and lock it when they had to return to the village. Once the agreement was in place, it was thought that Leshy or his spouse would take care of the grazing instead of the shepherd. This allowed the shepherd to focus on his own tasks and only have to deal with driving out and corralling the cattle. He could also easily call any cows from the forest by blowing a trumpet. The shepherd had to follow certain rules throughout the season. These included not watching the cattle in the forest, not harming them, not killing any forest animals, not damaging trees, not picking berries (especially black berries) and mushrooms, not swearing, not cutting hair or nails, not wearing his own clothes while grazing, not lending his pipe or batog to others, not touching other people (shaking hands, sharing utensils, bathing or sleeping with a woman), and not looking upon dead people or newborns. It was also forbidden to sell any cattle from the herd, scratch the wool of sheep, or damage any hedges. Breaking these taboos was believed to result in the breaking of the contract and could even lead to the death of the cattle and the shepherd.

It was believed that Leshy had the ability to steal cattle from people, particularly those who had been cursed and were "sent to Leshy". Leshy had the power to punish those who were careless with their cattle. If the cattle happened to wander into Leshy's territory, they could easily get lost. Leshy can "tie" the cattle to a tree, preventing them from moving and causing them to starve, or even "lock" or "hide" the animal in another realm, making it seem as though it had disappeared. Those searching for their lost cattle may hear the sound of the cow's bell nearby, but still be unable to find it. In some beliefs, Leshy would take care of the stolen cows, grazing and milking them. Leshy had the power to cause chaos among domesticated animals, such as wolves and bears, that were under the care of a negligent shepherd. In order to locate the missing animals, peasants not only conducted regular searches, but also performed a ritual known as "turning away". This involved going to a crossroads in the forest, often with the help of a knowledgeable person, and attempting to make a deal with Leshy. To appease him, they would offer gifts such as eggs or bread with salt, wrapped in a clean cloth and tied with a red thread. They would also pray to Leshy or use threats of magic, such as cursing all the forest roads or tying up all the trees. If the missing animal had not been taken by Leshy, it would usually return soon or Leshy would reveal its whereabouts. In some cases, Leshy would also reveal the animal's fate, whether it had been attacked by other animals, stolen by someone, or simply wandering outside of the forest.

=== Disappearances ===
Leshy are known for causing people to get lost in the forest, which is why they earned the moniker "guiders off-course". Those who find themselves lost in the woods are often believed to have fallen under a Leshy's spell, enveloped by an invisible force that transports them to an unknown realm. Individuals who unknowingly follow Leshy tracks are bound to wander aimlessly, their paths blocked with fallen trees and rivers, making escape even more challenging. Leshy can hide the lost person from prying eyes: people can hear that they are nearby but cannot find them. Leshy can bind the person to the tree in which they live, compelling the traveler to constantly return to it, and manipulate natural signs and landmarks that serve as guides on the path. Leshy can lure a hunter deep into the thicket by pretending to be an elusive or exotic animal. He can also mimic the voice of a friend, a crying child, or a dying person. By taking on the appearance of a familiar or unfamiliar companion, Leshy distracts his victim with conversations or promises of abundant mushroom or berry patches, only to lead them into an impassable place before disappearing. The lost person finds themselves in an unfamiliar place, maybe a different world. When the enchantment dissipates, the individual may discover that they were very close to their usual surroundings the whole time. Leshy can manifest as a familiar person and teasingly remain out of reach, suddenly vanishing, often at the boundary with the civilized world – for example, when crossing a bridge or fence – usually accompanied by laughter.

According to folklore, there are multiple ways to protect oneself from Leshy, whether he is perceived as a malevolent force, one of many forest spirits, or an ancient deity. These methods include reciting prayers, making the sign of the cross, calling upon the name of God, using profanity, or attempting to make Leshy laugh. To end an encounter with Leshy, one must repeat the original words spoken, completing a verbal circle. Other protective measures against Leshy include using salt, fire, a circle made with a sacred object, a linden stick, a coppice, or a mountain ash as talismans. It is also believed that Leshy is afraid of dogs, tricolored cats, and firearms loaded with copper bullets.

In order to break free from the spells of Leshy, an individual must go through a peculiar ritual of undressing completely and putting on their clothes in a non-traditional manner: inside out, backwards, switching shoes, and even flipping insoles. While removing their garments, it is crucial to vocally express strong oaths and forcefully strike them against the sturdy trunk of a tree. When getting dressed, it is recommended to recite a prayer and utter an incantation. Similarly, if one gets lost while riding in a cart, it is necessary to attach the horses in an inverted manner. One can try retracing their steps in reverse, following their own footprints in an effort to escape the confusing forest. Lastly, one can seek guidance and ask Leshy to help them find the correct path.

In a manner similar to demonic beings, Leshy possesses the power to abduct individuals, regardless of their age or gender. These abductions are shrouded in mystery, with the victims disappearing without a trace. The primary reason behind these abductions is typically tied to a curse, often inflicted by a parent, who sends their child to Leshy as punishment. In the case of a "cursed child" who manages to receive a christening, Leshy bides his time until the child reaches the age of seven before luring them into the depths of the forest. Instead of leaving an empty cradle, Leshy may replace the kidnapped baby with a "changeling" – an inanimate object such as a log or a bundle of straw. Alternatively, Leshy may leave behind his own child, who takes on the appearance of the kidnapped child but in a distorted and grotesque form. These changelings are often characterized by their constant anger, non-stop crying, inability to walk or talk, and lack of intelligence. Eventually, they either vanish, perish, or flee into the forest once they reach a certain age. Those who choose to remain among humans often become sorcerers.

Certain legends portray Leshies as treating their captives with kindness, providing them with sustenance, education, and hidden knowledge, ultimately transforming them into sorcerers and witch doctors. Leshy takes abducted girls as his wives and may even have children with them. However, if a woman gives birth to a Leshy's child and remains in a village, the child mysteriously disappears. Leshy is also known to abduct individuals with the intention of making them his slaves. Often, the abducted individuals become invisible to others, able to see their loved ones and hear their conversations, but unable to reveal themselves or communicate. Other tales suggest that the missing individuals become feral, losing their ability to understand language, wear clothes, and becoming covered in moss and bark, as well as exhibiting aggressive behavior and running away from people. There are also stories in which the "abducted" individuals perish due to exhaustion, starvation, falling into a pit, or becoming stuck in a swamp.

It was believed that one could safeguard themselves from abduction through the use of either Christian or pagan methods. Christians would turn to prayer, crossing themselves, remembering God, and attending prayer services. Pagans, on the other hand, would utter the phrase "dibs on me", recite incantations, perform the ritual of "turning away", or attempt to catch up with the abductor within the confines of the forest. When searching for a missing person in the woods, people would use the same "turning away" ritual as they would for finding a lost pet, but with more substantial offerings. These offerings included bread, salt, pancakes, pies, a pot of porridge, or a piece of lard. Family members would call upon a house-spirit for protection against Leshy, communicating with it through the chimney. According to popular belief, a person who had been kidnapped should avoid consuming any food provided by Leshy in order to be able to return home. However, there were other stories where individuals who had eaten Leshy's offerings were able to successfully find their way back, only to discover that the food they had taken had transformed into cones, moss, and other natural objects. If Leshy had made a deal with the lost individual, he might guide them out of the forest or reveal their location to those searching for them. Leshy's reaction to releasing his captives was unpredictable – he could do so with joy and a warning to stay away, in annoyance for being disturbed, or reluctantly trying to keep his victim. There were also instances where Leshy would return long-lost captives as a reward for assistance or when they were no longer needed, or even give a kidnapped girl in marriage to others.

There was a belief that those who returned from Leshy were forever changed. They either struggled to find their words, suffered mental wounds, or emerged with a newfound sense of purpose and mystic abilities. These individuals were rumored to possess powers of witchcraft, the ability to foresee the future, and the gift of communicating with otherworldly entities. They were often drawn back to the forest, avoiding society and finding it difficult to form lasting relationships. The details of their time spent with Leshy were kept secret, as some feared that revealing too much could have dire consequences. In the case of young women who returned, known as forest maidens in the Smolensk region, the effects of their encounters with Leshy often manifested after marriage.

== Rituals and communication ==
The art of summoning Leshy involves various intricate rituals and methods. One technique includes creating a circle with young birch trees and calling out by removing a cross and shouting loudly, "Grandfather!" Another method entails felling a pine tree onto two aspen trees in the forest and standing on them while facing north to invoke Leshy. On the night of Ivan Kupala, one can cut down an aspen tree so that it falls to the east, then stand on the stump facing east, bend over, look between their legs, and say, "Uncle Leshy! Show yourself as I am, not as a gray wolf, black raven, or fir-tree." Other ways to summon Leshy include not praying at night and thinking about him before bed, sitting on a pine stump and beckoning three times, closing the door with one's left hand before entering the forest, digging up an anthill with one's left foot, cutting the top of a birch tree with one's left hand, and shouting "U-u-u!" Another method is to remove a cross at night in the forest, bury it in the ground, and say, "Lord of forests, I have a request for you!"

On Christmas Eve, it was a common practice to engage in fortune-telling rituals in the forest, often at a crossroads and during the night. The fortune-tellers would create three circles or use the skin of an animal as a boundary, placing a magical object such as a poker within. Sitting on the skin, they would also place a piece of bread and sometimes other objects beside them, and then ask Leshy for insight into the upcoming year. The response would come in the form of various forest sounds, which the fortune-tellers would interpret. It was believed that Leshy would only answer three questions and failure to follow the ritual could result in severe consequences. It was also believed that on Maundy Thursday, one could seek out an old birch tree in the forest, sit upon it, and call upon Leshy (“Forest King, father to all animals, appear here!”) to reveal the future. Additionally, it was said that Leshy could foretell the fate of anyone who encountered him. In certain regions, the appearance of Leshy was seen as a sign of impending trouble.

When discussing encounters with Leshy, as well as other malevolent entities, it is often said that one must "lure", or "tempt", or "scare" him in order to make contact. However, there are tales in which Leshy is able to communicate with humans without any obstacles: visiting a pub and drinking vodka, hiring a person to work for him, visiting people, playing matchmaker for a girl he fancies, and so on. There are also stories in which Leshy is portrayed as a giant, riding on humans transformed into horses, carrying a person on his back, or stealing food and supplies from people, including grain and nails. At times, Leshy even seeks assistance from humans: asking to be taught how to play the harmonica, requesting food, having a midwife help deliver Leshy's child, being freed by a hunter from fellow hunters, being cared for by a woman after being found naked in the woods, and receiving prayers from a man to help ward off devils. In return, Leshy shows gratitude towards humans by helping them become wealthy, giving them magical objects, and taking their place in the army. It is believed that during human wars, Leshy and other forest spirits may also engage in battles among themselves. Leshy is frequently referenced in swear words, although he can be substituted with "devil" in those instances.

== Female Leshy ==
The feminine counterpart of Leshy takes on many forms, just like Leshy himself. She may appear as a grotesque being with exaggerated features, or as a regular woman; either unclothed or dressed in rags or a flowing garment. Her hair may be wild, adorned with branches, or she may appear as a towering, aged figure. Some stories describe her as a gigantic woman with the ability to suspend her offspring in cradles from trees.

In ancient Russian tales, the wife of Leshy is portrayed as a powerful figure in the forest, known for her terrifying cries, luring wanderers off course, and snatching children and livestock. These feminine counterparts also share similar characteristics with Leshy, such as stealing unblessed food, making deals with shepherds to graze their livestock, and showing appreciation to those who aid her. In Ukrainian folklore, there is a tale of a man who marries a forest spirit girl after baptizing her and stealing her clothes while she was bathing.

In northern folklore, the female equivalent of Leshy bears a striking resemblance to a mermaid, known as the "free old woman" or "mistress" of the tundra and bogs. She is said to possess the traits of a cursed girl who perished in the forest. This feminine counterpart of Leshy is often seen as a distinct character, being mostly independent from the original image of her.

== In popular culture ==
- The Wood Demon (Leshy, 1889) by Anton Chekhov features a character who is nicknamed after Leshy due to his devotion to the forests.
- Leshy is used as a prototype for the main character of Vladimir Vysotsky's song "Lukomorye", which depicts Leshy as an alcoholic who spends all his money on drinking and is abusive to his wife.
- Leshy was the inspiration for an antagonist of the video-game Inscryption, who is also named "Leshy".
- In Karol Kalinowski's comic-book Łauma the main protagonist is guarded by the Yotvingians' version of Leshy, the Lauma. They also appear on the cover.
- The name "Leshy" can designate a type of ghillie suit used by military personnel for camouflage in forests and grassy fields.
- The character "Leshy" appears as the guardian of the forest in Mavka, based on the 1918 play The Forest Song by poet Lesya Ukrainka.

== See also ==
- Äbädä (Tatarstan)
- Aja (Yoruba people of West Africa)
- Basajaun (Basque Country)
- Berstuk (Wend people of Germany)
- Bolotnik (Slavic region)
- Boruta (Slavic region)
- Domovoy (Slavic region)
- Dryad (Greece)
- Ent (J.R.R. Tolkien’s Middle-earth)
- Feldgeister (Germany)
- Green Man (England)
- Jinn (Arabian, Islamic)
- Kikimora (Slavic region)
- Landvættir (Iceland)
- Mežainis (Latvian forest spirit)
- Miškinis (Lithuanian forest spirit)
- Moss people (Germanic region)
- Ochopintre (Republic of Georgia)
- Shatans (Belarus, Russian Federation)
- Shishiga (Russia)
- Silvanus (Ancient Rome and Gaul)
- Skogsrå (Fennoscandia)
- Troll (Fennoscandia)
- Vir'ava (Erzya and Moksha forest spirit)
- Vörsa (Komi mythology)
- Wight (Germanic and Nordic regions)
- Woodwose (medieval Europe)
- Yum Caax (Mayan)
