= Cabiri (disambiguation) =

Origin of the word from Greek Mythology, Cabeiri, a group of Grecian deities

Cabiri may also refer to:

== Computing ==
- Cabiri, a UK based E-commerce system integration company

== Fiction ==
- Cabiri, a demon lord in Dungeons & Dragons

== Non-Profit Groups ==
- The Cabiri, a Seattle-based performance troupe

== Places ==
- Cabiri, Angola
