= Black Book (video game) =

2021 video game

- Developer: Morteshka
- Publisher: HypeTrain Digital
- Engine: Unity Engine
- Platforms: Windows; OS X Linux; Nintendo Switch; PlayStation 4 Xbox One
- Release: August 10, 2021
- Genres: Role-playing, adventure
- Mode: Single-player

Black Book (Russian: Чёрная книга) is an adventure role-playing video game, developed by Morteshka, which created The Mooseman, and published by HypeTrain Digital. The game was released on August 10, 2021.

Taking place in 19th century Russia, the game is heavily inspired by Russian and Komi folklore and is based on Bailichkas. To ensure the authenticity in depiction of myths and real-life locations, the developers worked alongside Russian ethnographers.

== Gameplay ==
In the game, players control Vasilisa - a young sorceress, who travels across the landscape of rural Russia, aiding commonfolk along the way. The players achieve that by solving puzzles and engaging in battle using a deck-building card combat system. Throughout the journey, choices made by the player will affect the plot and general progression of the game.

== Development ==
Development of the game started in 2017. The game was released for Steam, PlayStation 4, Xbox One and Nintendo Switch on August 10, 2021. It is the second game developed by Russian team Morteshka. Black Book was designed to bear some connections with the previous game, Mooseman. The game's scope expanded compared to what it was intended to be at the beginning of its Kickstarter campaign.

== Reception ==
Reception

Aggregate scores
Aggregator	Score
Metacritic	NS: 81/100; PC: 75/100; XONE: 79/100
OpenCritic	81/100

Review score
Publication	Score
RPGamer	3.5/5

Rock Paper Shotgun found that while the card battles were sometimes ill-balanced, they praised the game for its specific approach to Russian folklore, stating that it was where it "shows its heart".
