= The Cabiri =

The Cabiri, a Seattle-based non-profit physical theater troupe, was founded in 1999 by Artistic Director John S. Murphy. In 2001, the troupe became legally incorporated (under the organization The Anunnaki Project) and obtained 501(c)(3) status from the IRS. The mission of The Cabiri and The Anunnaki Project is to preserve the mythologies of cultures that have passed into antiquity, utilizing theatrical, storytelling dance performances, educational presentations, and a free online encyclopedia of terms from folklore and mythology.

Since its inception, the troupe has utilized a variety of mediums to present "performative mythology," theatrical depictions of tales from folklore and mythology. Tales from Babylonian mythology, Celtic mythology, Chinese mythology, Greek mythology, Italian folklore, Japanese mythology, Romanian folklore, Russian mythology, Sumerian mythology, and other mythos have been utilized in past productions.

The Cabiri's early work consisted primarily of street theater and performance art including fire dancing, stilt walking, and juggling. In 2001 the company began incorporating aerial dance on low-flying trapeze, aerial sling, aerial hoop (lyra), and other apparatus. Aerial dance has since become the primary performance focus of the troupe.

In 2006, the organization expanded its activities to include aerial dance instruction for adults.

The troupe draws from accredited academic resources that have undergone peer review when creating new work, and strives to educate the public about folklore and mythology via its theatrical productions. The organization's work has been presented to thousands of audience members throughout North America in the last decade and has been featured in a variety of media and arts-related publications.

== Performance history ==
- The Genesis of Ereshkigal (July 2000): utilizing puppetry, physical theatre, and fire performance, this early production depicted Ereshkigal's abduction by Kur and Enki's rescue attempt.
- The Kojiki of Amaterasu (September 2001): one of the final performances on the stage at the old Seattle Opera House, the story of Japanese solar goddess Amaterasu.
- Vasalisa the Beautiful (March 2002): a tale from Russian folklore, in which Baba Yaga, the forest witch encounters the lovely Vasalisa and sets before her three impossible tasks.
- Dance of the Calusari (May 2003): in collaboration with Radost Folk Ensemble, explored Romanian folklore and the Calusari folk dancers.
- The Ghost Game (October 2006): survey of folklore and mythology regarding ghosts; premise inspired by Hyaku Monogatari, a Japanese ghost story game.
- Garden of Dreams (June 2007): nine tales depicting folklore and mythology of plants from a variety of cultures.
- Gods of the Night (July 2008): seven Mesopotamian planetary gods and Inanna's epic descent to the Underworld and encounter with Ereshkigal, Queen of the Sumerian Underworld.
- The Ghost Game: Tales of 13 Witches (October 2008): nine performances exploring the witch archetype in folklore and mythology.
- The Ghost Game: Dead Gods (October 2009): six vignettes depicting deaths of deities from folklore and mythology.
- Carpathian Dawn (April 2010): a full length production drawing tales from Slavic mythology including the bathhouse spirit Bannik, house spirits Domovoi, and primary god Svarog.
- The Ghost Game: Devil In the Deep Blue Sea (October 2010): seven vignettes exploring tales from bodies of water, including the Slavic Rusalka, the Scottish Each uisge, Japanese Kappa, Ondine, and Egyptian Apep.
- The Ghost Game: Winternacht (October 2011): vignettes exploring tales of winter, including the Slavic Marzanna, the Himalayan Yeti, Algonquian Wendigo, and Russian Father Frost, and Hittite Telepinu.
- Tarhun: Legend of the Lightning God (April 2012): a full-length production depicting the storm god Tarhun and his battles against various foes including the great serpent Illuyanka, frost god Hahhimas and rock golem Ullikummi.

== Publishing ==
In April 2012, the organization published its first book "Tarhun: Legend of the Lightning God." Co-authored by Mark Teppo and John Murphy, the text explores Hittite mythology, focusing upon storm god mythos and includes a novelization of the script for the theatrical production by the same name. ISBN 978-0-9853031-4-3.

== Photos ==
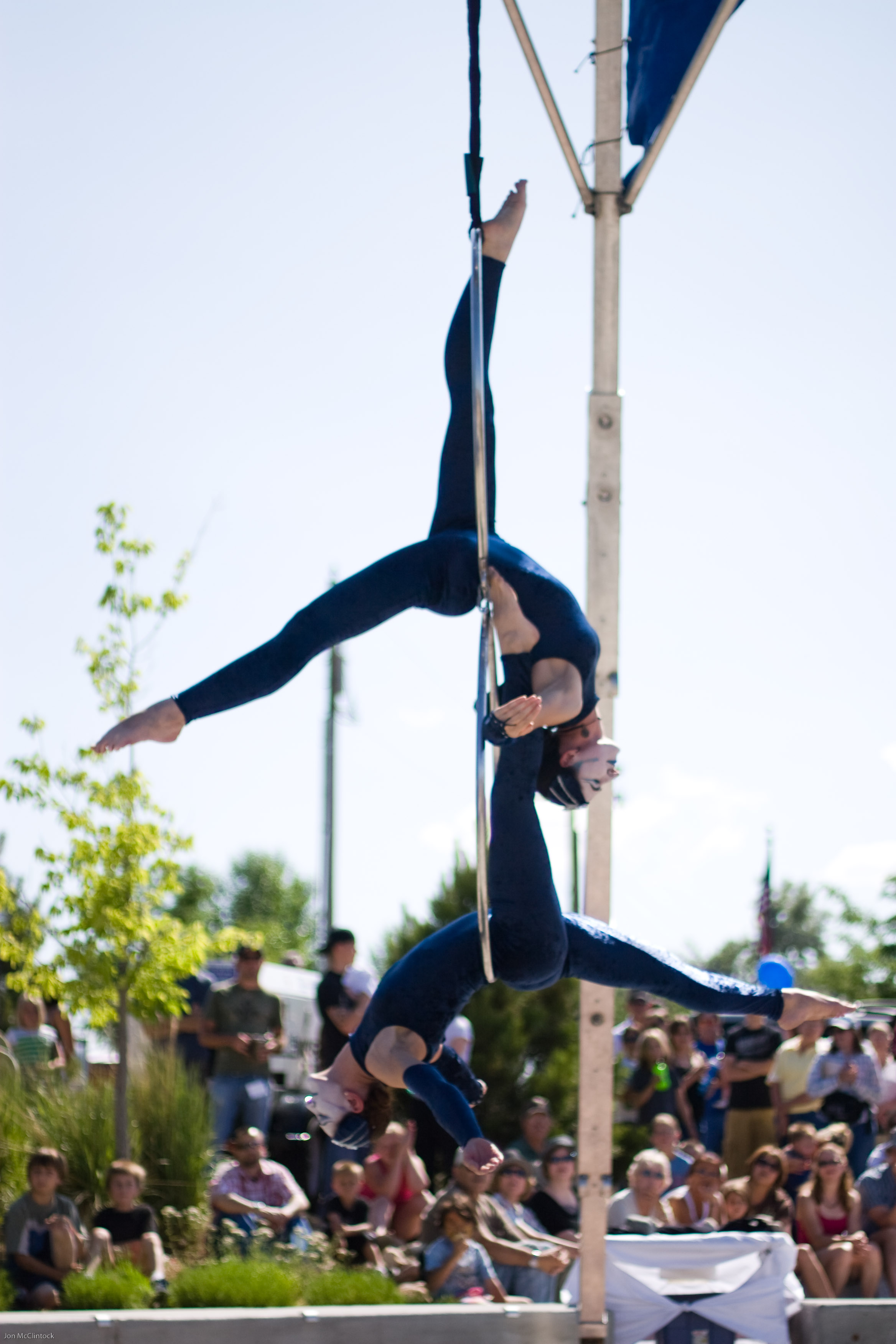
Members of The Cabiri performance troupe as "Ishtar", June 2009

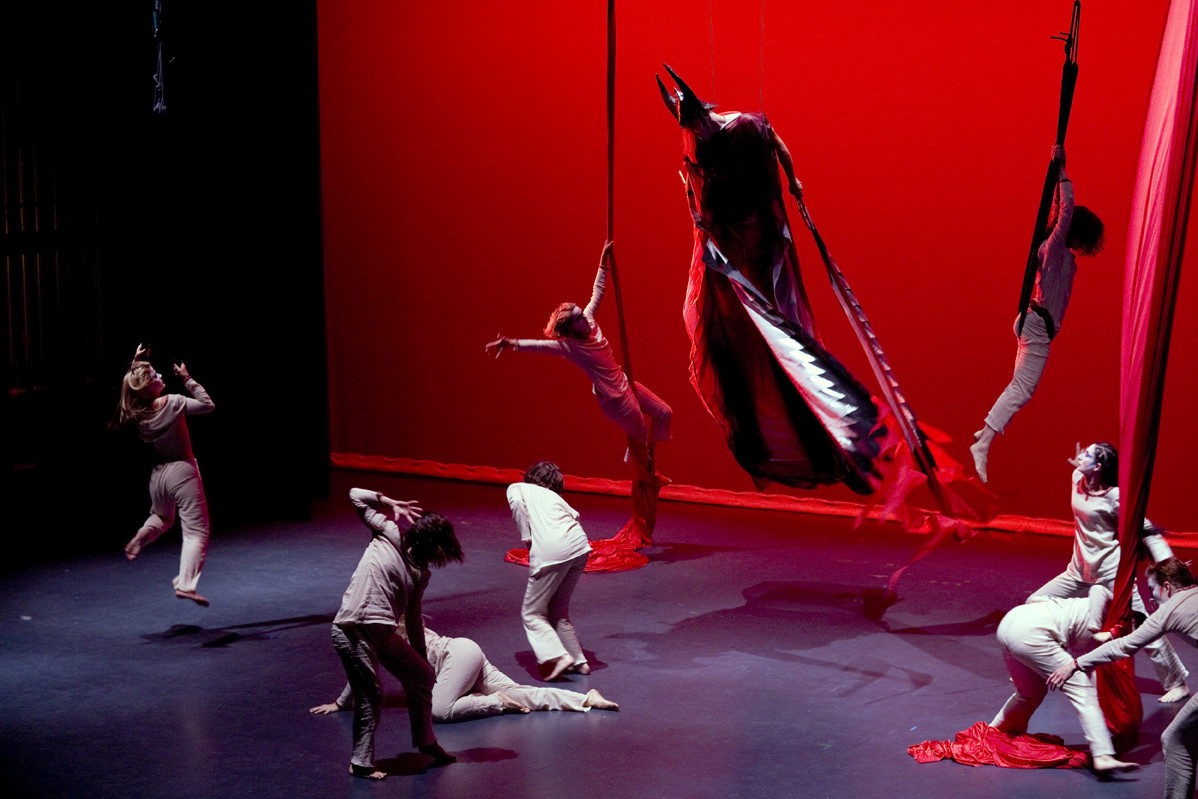
The Cabiri performance troupe in "Nergal", July 2008
