= Shatans =

Shatans (Belarusian: Шатаны) are odd-looking creatures of Belarusian folklore. Shatans are neutral characters and act as symbols of idleness and laziness.

== Mode of life ==
Shatans lead a mindless way of life. All day long they wander about aimlessly without doing anything useful. Shatans are very annoying for other people and dispose them to the same way of useless wandering. Shatans cannot communicate with anyone in a normal way, even with each other, and in case of trouble they don't rescue and help one another.

In Belarusian folklore it is said that angry folkloric creatures (for example, the witch) tease shatans. As shatans are also known as cowardly creatures which hide or run away from offenders. Sometimes, shatans have died from attacks of evil spirits and beings.

When shatans are tired of wandering around, they sometimes spin bast shoes. Bast shoes are quickly worn away because of the shatans' useless wandering.

== See also ==
- Damavik
- Dzedka
- Lazavik
- Younik
- Zheuzhyk
- Zhytsen
- Zlydzens
