= Miskin (disambiguation) =

Miskin is a small village in the district of Pontyclun, Rhondda Cynon Taf, Wales.

Miskin may also refer to:

- Miskin, Mountain Ash, a village in Penrhiwceiber, Rhondda Cynon Taf, Wales
- Miskin, Karakalpakstan, a town in Karakalpakstan, Uzbekistan
- Miskin Manor, an 1864 Victorian manor house in Miskin in Rhondda Cynon Taf, Wales
- Miskin Radio, a student-run radio station at North Kent College
- Sir James Miskin QC, British barrister and judge who served as Recorder of London 1975–90
- Miskin (painter), a Mughal-era painter in the court of Akbar I
- Myshkin (surname), a Russian surname

== See also ==
- Myshkin (disambiguation)
- Battle of Maroua–Miskin (18–21 January 1902), between Fulani troops and the German Schutztruppe in Cameroon
- Miskin's swift (Sabera dobboe), a butterfly of the family Hesperiidae
