= The Mooseman =

2017 video game

- English-language logo of the game
- Developer: Morteshka
- Publisher: Sometimes You
- Programmer: Vladimir Beletsky
- Artist: Vladimir Beletsky
- Writer: Vladimir Beletsky
- Composer: Mikhail Shvachko
- Engine: Unity
- Platforms: Windows, macOS, Linux, Android, iOS, Nintendo Switch, PlayStation 4, Xbox One, PlayStation Vita, PlayStation 5, Xbox Series X/S
- Release: 17 February 2017: macOS, Windows; 17 February 2017; Linux; 17 September 2017; Android, iOS; 17 April 2018; Switch, PS4, Xbox One; 18 July 2018; PlayStation Vita; AS: 5 January 2022; PS5, Xbox Series X/S; 16 March 2022
- Genre: Adventure game
- Mode: Single-player

The Mooseman (Note: Russian: Человеколось, Komi-Permyak: Мортвӧрмӧс) is an adventure video game developed by the Perm-based Russian studio Morteshka and released in 2017. The game is based on the mythology of Komi, as well as other Finno-Ugric peoples, and is an attempt at artistic reconstruction of mythological plots. The game tells the story of the Mooseman, the shaman and one of the seven sons of the creator god Yen, who must travel to the underworld to retrieve Shondi (the sun) and save the world from the eternal cold.

The Mooseman was well received by the gaming press. It was praised for its distinctive and atmospheric art style, sound design, skillful use of the mythology in the story, but criticized for its short length.

== Gameplay ==
The gameplay consists of moving the protagonist, the Mooseman, through a 2D-world, and solving various puzzles. The Mooseman can only move left or right, and, being "The One Who Knows", is able to move between the world's real and spirit planes. Switching between planes allows the player to see spirits and changes the surrounding objects: for example, what in the real plane seems like an ordinary boulder, in the spirit plane begins to move itself. The player can use such objects to hide from enemies or, for example, to build a bridge over an abyss. During the game the player can collect artifacts of the Permian animal style hidden in different locations, each of them has short historical descriptions. Passing the idols, the player opens entries in the in-game encyclopedia that explains the Komi mythology, the same idols serve as save points. Unlocked myths in the encyclopedia are written in Anbur, the ancient Permic alphabet.

The game also has enemies, which player has to defend or escape from. They are evil spirits, as well as the dead who are trapped in the Sir-Yu River, which separates the world of the dead. In addition, the game has bosses, various deities of Permiс Komi mythology, but to defeat them, player has to solve a puzzle. At a certain stage of the game, the Mooseman can gain the ability to light his staff with Shondi to protect himself from evil spirits, and at one of the locations he will have to shoot a bow.

== Story ==
The story in the game is presented without direct dialogue between the characters, both through the visual and through the entries from the in-game encyclopedia. The player unlocks new entries in the encyclopedia which as he passes by the idols. At the beginning of the walkthrough the player is not given any information, but in the end the data from encyclopedia come together. The cutscenes in the game are voiced in Komi-Permyak language.

The moose god Yen, the creator of the world, hatched from an egg laid by the duck floating on a boundless ocean. From the shell of this egg the Middle World (the world of humans and spirits) was created, when Yen saw himself in reflection, from the two moose heads the Upper World (the abode of gods and souls) was created, and when Yen was born, the Lower World (the place where the cursed ones live) was formed in the depths of the ocean. One day Yen decided to find himself a wife, and found three sisters on Earth, mere mortals. To test them, Yen gave them his moose hide. The older and middle sisters tried to scrape the moose fat off the hide to eat it, but the younger one tried to take care of it, and it proved worthy. Eventually the younger sister became Yen's wife and bore him seven sons, demi-gods moosemen. From the father the sons learned to communicate with spirits, and from the mother they learned human feelings. Subsequently, Yen got tired of living in the dugout and took his sons and left his wife for good, to hunt for the swift six-legged moose.

The six-legged moose carried Shondi (eternal flame) on its horns from the lower world to the upper world. Yen chased the moose through the taiga for a long time, and one day he killed it and nailed its hide to the stars. But when Yen killed the moose, Shondi fell into the lower world, and its light and heat stopped reaching the other worlds, and still remains there. The world could have perished from the eternal cold without Shondi's heat. To prevent the world from perishing, Yen instructed each of his seven sons to descend daily into the Lower World to raise the fire from Shondi to the upper world, from where it can light and warm all worlds.

After this, the main plot of the game begins. The Mooseman, as played by the player, descends into the Lower World, the entrance to which is guarded by Kudym-Osh the bear-man, passing the Sir-Yu River full of evil dead, and guarding Shondi is Cheran the spider, the psychopomp. After obtaining a piece of Shondi, the Mooseman ascends the web of Cheran to the Middle World along with innumerable orts, the souls of dead people, who must pass all three worlds and find their rest in the Upper World. Subsequently, he has to pass through the underwater realm of Vakul (water deity), who looks like a giant pike, and then, having ascended to the Middle World, to commit sacrifice to the Vorsa, the forest deity. The Mooseman then passes through the Komi town of Kudymkar. Upon reaching the bird named Kars, The Mooseman mounts him and soars into the sky, toward the Upper World, but his way is blocked by Voipel, god of the northern wind. In the end, The Mooseman manages to reach the Upper World and illuminate the world with the fire of Shondi, continuing the eternal cycle.

== Development ==
The game's developer is Vladimir Beletsky from the Perm, Russia. He was developing The Mooseman in his spare time, while at his main job he supervised the creation of another game, Tanki X. The development of the game began in May 2015, when Vladimir Beletsky drew the game logo in the Permian animal style and made a short document describing the general concept. Beletsky sent this document to his friend Mikhail Shvachko, who became the game's composer and sound designer, while Beletsky was an artist, writer, game designer, and programmer at the same time. Initially the game was planned as an endless runner that would take one week to develop, but then Beletsky realized that the project was becoming something more than that, and the team wanted to make the game more in-depth. Locomalito's L'Abbaye des Morts game served as a reference point and source of inspiration. The visual style was inspired by the works of Norwegian artist Theodor Kittelsen and Hayao Miyazaki's anime films, and it was decided to draw characters and creatures in silhouettes, because it was easier and created the right atmosphere.

=== Mythology in the game ===
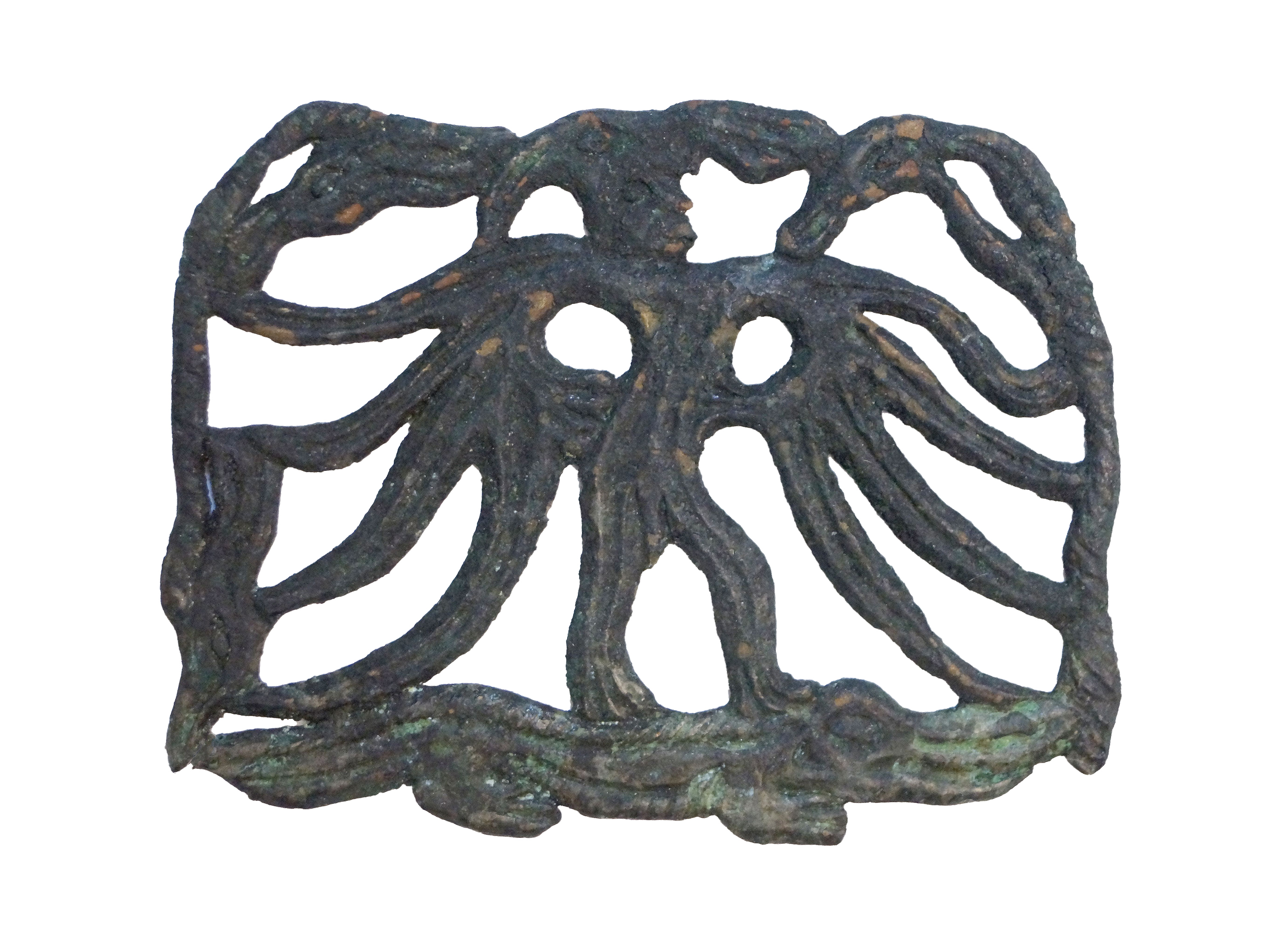
An artifact depicting a man with a moose head standing on a lizard. Many of these artifacts of the Permian animal style, represented in the Perm Regional Museum, appear in the game

In matters of mythology and material culture, the authors consulted the Perm Regional Museum. The developers turned to the museum after doing the draft of the plot and the list of the idols of the Perm animal style, which were to be present in the game, were ready. Eduard Churilov, head of the museum's archaeology department, advised the developers of scientific literature on the subject and pointed out flaws in the plot. After that Beletsky refused to use the artefacts of the Cherdyn goddesses in the game, because they are not objects of the Permian animal style and were brought from somewhere in these lands. The developers also abandoned the dualistic pantheon described in the scientific literature on Komi mythology, and instead reconstructed the solar myth based on the stories depicted on the idols and the Sámi legend of Myanndash. In addition, the reconstruction included elements of Mansi mythology. In the credits of the game there is a list of scientific literature used in writing the story. To learn more on subject, the developers visited Cherdyn, but to their dismay they found that the pagan culture has been irrevocably lost, except for the collection of the Cherdyn museum. According to Beletsky, the team met with Limerov, the author of one of the books, after the game was released, and he approved of their work.

=== Music ===
Shvachko wrote music based on Komi folk motifs. According to Belinsky, they were helped by a Parisian, who was fond of throat singing: such singing is not peculiar to Finno-Ugric peoples, but it was suitable for voicing some spirits. In the game there is choral music in the Komi-Permyak and Komi-Zyrian language, performed by the student choir of the Perm Krai College of Arts and Culture. One of the songs is called "Asya Kya" (Komi: Morning Dawn), and is used during the transition between worlds, and the other is "Yen Dzodzogez" (Komi-Permyak: God's Geese), which plays during the final credits. In early 2020, the soundtrack of The Mooseman was released on limited-edition audio cassette from the Minimum Records label.

=== Release ===
The promotion of The Mooseman went through non-core press: the developers sent press releases to publications that usually do not write about games, such as the newspaper Argumenty i Fakty or the channel Rossiya 24, as well as participated in various indie game contests. The game was released on February 17, 2017, and its release was timed to coincide with the day of the Komi-Permyak language. On April 17, 2018, the game was ported to smartphones, and on July 18, 2018, the game was ported to Nintendo Switch, Xbox One and PlayStation 4 consoles. In late 2020, the game was released in physical format for PlayStation 4 in 999 copies. A boxed edition of the game was prepared by Red Art Games. In December 2021, it was announced that The Mooseman would be one of the last two games in history for the PlayStation Vita to have a physical edition. The other game was A Winter's Daydream.

== Reception ==
Reception

Aggregate scores
Aggregator	Score
Metacritic	NS: 70/100; PC: 77/100; XONE: 75/100
OpenCritic	71/100; 47% Critics Recommend

Review scores
Publication	Score
Eurogamer	8/10 (Italy)
Nintendo Life	6/10
StopGame.ru	Decent
RiotPixels	81 %
PlayGround	7,5/10
Kotonavty	9,5/10

The game was well received by critics, who praised its successful art style, effective use of Finno-Ugric folklore, atmospheric music and sound design, as well as its educational value in terms of mythology. However, opinions were mixed regarding the game's short length and underdeveloped gameplay. The Mooseman was frequently compared to other games, such as Journey, Limbo, and Never Alone.

Riot Pixels praised the game's visually pleasing art direction, calling it a true work of art inspired by folk traditions, while its artistic minimalism was compared by the reviewer to Limbo. Yaroslav Gafner, a reviewer for StopGame.ru, also drew parallels with Limbo and noted similarities to Never Alone. He highlighted the game's informative portrayal of Finno-Ugric beliefs and its distinctive visuals as strengths, while criticizing its unpolished animations and short length.

Kotonavty admired the game’s creative visual compositions despite the developers' limited technical resources. Though the reviewer acknowledged its superficial resemblance to Limbo, the experience reminded them more of Journey. They concluded: "This is a very small game, but it leaves an unforgettable impression. And if it sparks an interest in Komi mythology, then the developers have even overdelivered on their mission."

Oleg Chimde, a critic for DTF.ru, described the game as "an academic study"—albeit in video game form—and argued that it could foster interest in Komi mythology among those who might otherwise never engage with it. The magazine Darker likened the game to an engaging museum tour, where dry subject matter is transformed into "a digestible essence, easily absorbed even by the most hardcore mouse-and-keyboard paladins." While praising the immersive atmosphere, particularly the sound and music rooted in Komi-Permyak motifs, Darker found the gameplay dull. Despite this, the reviewer believed the game was still compelling enough to warrant a full playthrough.

A PlayGround.ru reviewer noted visual similarities to The Banner Saga, The Void, and Pathologic. They enjoyed the depiction of the Lower World but felt the Middle and Upper Worlds were too brief and underdeveloped. The review concluded: "A beautiful reason to open Wikipedia."

The Mooseman also received coverage in international gaming media. The Italian edition of Eurogamer deemed it a genuine artistic achievement, arguing that judging the game solely on its gameplay would be "sacrilegious." Nintendo Life compared the experience to a museum visit but cautioned that the controls could occasionally feel unintuitive and frustrating.
