= Myshkin =

Myshkin (masculine) or Myshkina (feminine) may refer to:

- Myshkin (surname) (Myshkina), list of real and fictional people with this family name
- Myshkin (town), a town in Myshkinsky District of Yaroslavl Oblast, Russia
- Myshkin Urban Settlement, a municipal formation which the town of district significance of Myshkin in Myshkinsky District of Yaroslavl Oblast, Russia is incorporated as
- Myshkin (singer), American singer-songwriter
- Myshkin (director), Indian film director
- Myshkin (album), 2008 album by Michou
- Myshkin, a 1973 opera by John Eaton

== See also ==
- Myshkinsky District
- Mishkin, Russian surname
