= Shishiga =

Legendary creature in Russian folklore

Shishiga is also an informal name for 2-tonne army truck GAZ-66

Shishiga (from Russian: шиши́га, also called leshenka, ле́шенка) is a female swamp (or forest) creature similar to the wood-goblin in Russian folklore and mythology. It is described as white, nude, and tousled and is considered to harass the people and bring misfortune to the drunkards.

The same creature is important in the mythology of Komi people. She supposedly lives in the Kama River and often goes to the shore to comb her hair. Everybody who sees her will soon drown or die by another cause.
