= Karzełek =

Slavic mine-dwelling creature

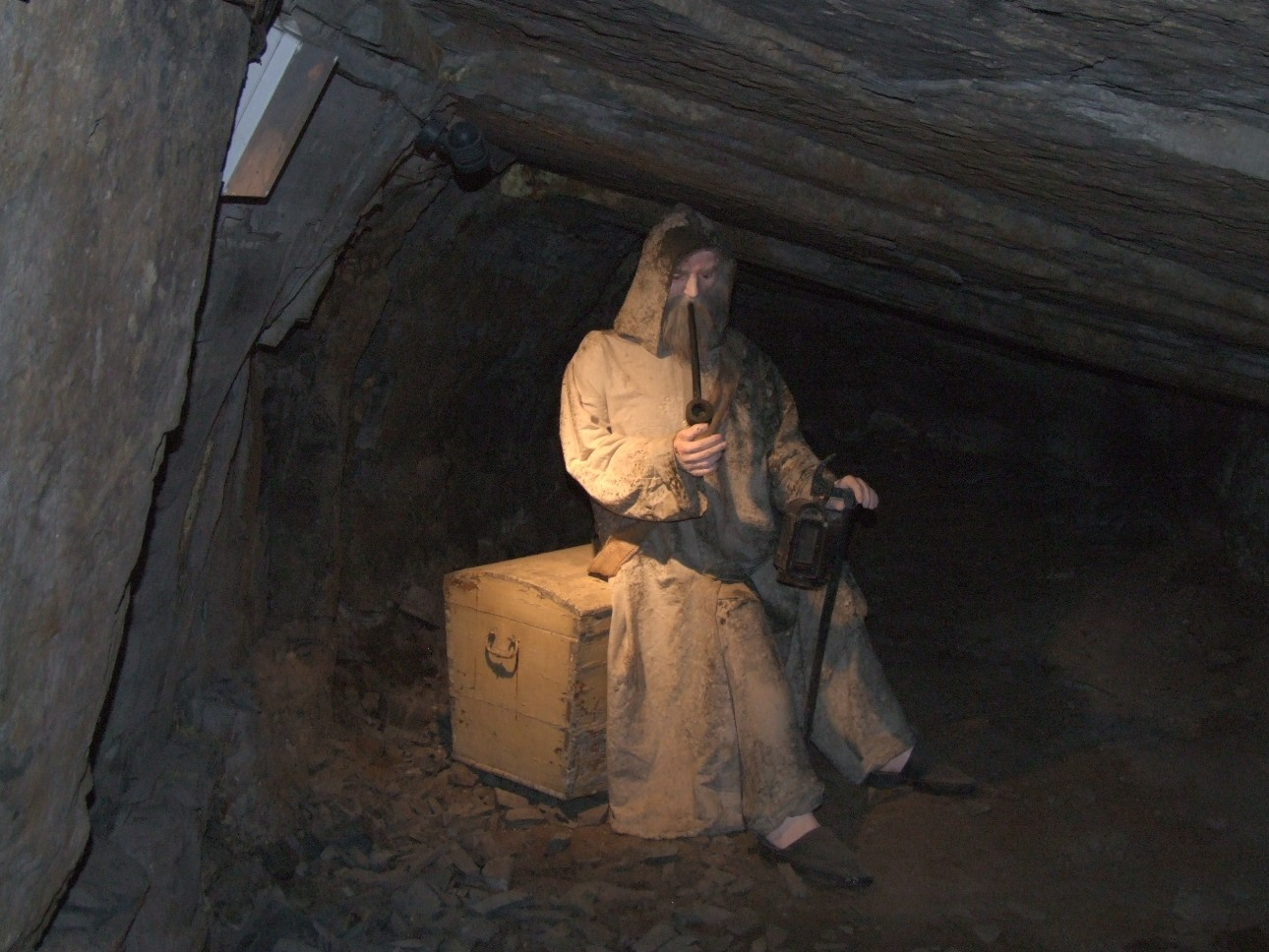
Skarbnik in Subterranean Skansen Guido Zabrze

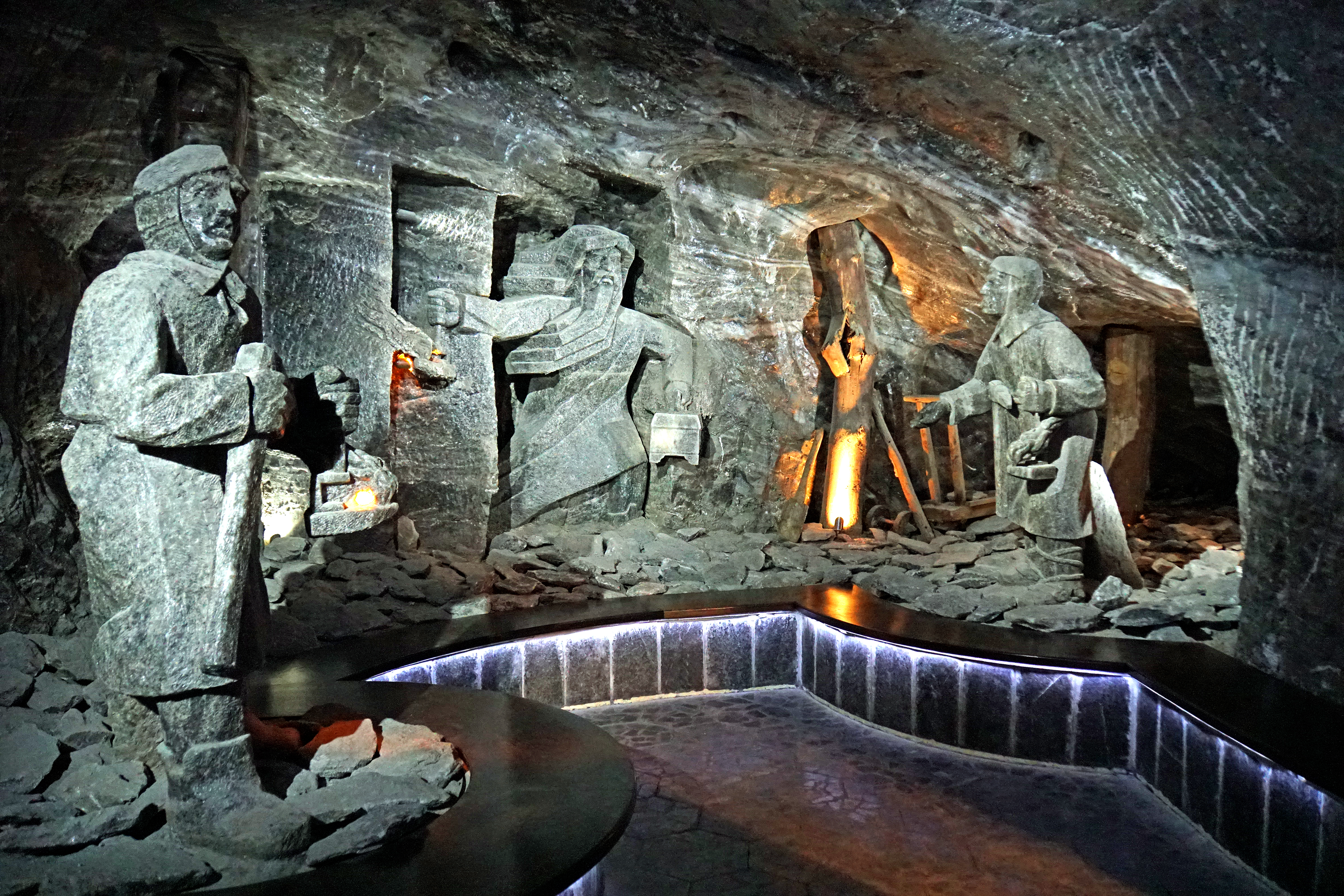
Skarbnik in Wieliczka Salt Mine.

The Skarbnik (from Polish skarbnik – person collecting money, treasurer) or Kladenets (Ukrainian: Скарбник, Russian: Кладенец; the Treasurer) is a spirit who lives in mines and underground workings and is the guardian of gems, crystals, and precious metals. It is said that he will protect miners from danger and lead them back when they are lost. He will also lead them to veins of ore. To people who are evil or insult him, he is deadly, pushing them into dark chasms or send tunnels crashing down upon them. Hurling rocks, whistling, or covering one's head are actions that are offensive to Skarbnik, who will warn the offender with handfuls of pelted soil in their direction before taking serious action.

== See also ==
- Dzedka
- Gnome
- Knocker
- Kobold
- Krasnoludek
