= Albertas Miškinis =

Lithuanian politician

Albertas Miškinis (born 12 April 1938 in Panevėžys District Municipality) is a Lithuanian politician. In 1990 he was among those who signed the Act of the Re-Establishment of the State of Lithuania.

== See also ==
- Politics of Lithuania
