= Mishkin =

Mishkin (Russian: Мишкин) is a Russian masculine surname, its feminine counterpart is Mishkina. It may be derived from the masculine given name Mishka, a diminutive form of Mikhail. It may refer to the following people:

- Alexander Mishkin (born 1979), Russian doctor and member of Russian military intelligence service
- Andrew Mishkin (born 1958), American Jet Propulsion Laboratory engineer who worked on the Mars Rover
- Dan Mishkin (born 1953), American comic book writer
- Emilio Óscar Rabasa Mishkin (1925–2008), Mexican politician, diplomat and academic
- Frederic Mishkin (born 1951), American economist and member of the US Federal Reserve
- Herman Mishkin (1870–1948), Russian-American photographer
- Lee Mishkin (1927–2001), American animator and director
- Leo Mishkin (1907–1980), American film, theater, and television critic
- Meyer Mishkin (1912–1999), Hollywood agent
- Mírzá Mishkín-Qalam (1826–1912), Persian calligrapher
- Mortimer Mishkin (1926–2021), American neuropsychologist

== Fictional characters ==
- Dmitri Mishkin, character in the James Bond film GoldenEye

== See also ==
- Myshkin (disambiguation)
- Myshkin (surname), a similar Russian surname
- Miskin, a Welsh village
- Mysskin, Indian film director
