= Yum Kaax =

Mayan deity

Yum Kaax (Mayan pronunciation: [jum kʼaːʃ], "Lord of the forest"), also known as Yumká is a Yukatek Maya name for the god of the wild vegetation and guardian of its animals.

In the past, this god has wrongly been described as an agricultural deity or even as the Maya maize god (god E of the codices), which has become a popular and still existing misconception. In ethnographic reality, Yum Kaax is a god of wild plants and of animals that are important to hunters. As such, he grants protection of the fields against the incursions of the wild nature he himself represents. This type of deity is also found among indigenous peoples of North America. Invoked by hunters, he is the owner of all the game. He can appear to hunters in an instant and possesses songs that will warrant a hunter success and allow his arrows to come back to him.

== Role in Maya culture ==
Pre-Columbian contact, Yum Kaax was considered one of the most important deities in the Maya pantheon and was used to help those who hunted for their food. Tradition farmers would invoke his name and present him with the first fruits of their fields, carved out from the forest, so that wild animals and vegetation would not destroy their fields. Hunters far out in the wilderness would sometimes take off their shirt, spread it over four stakes in the ground, and then crawl underneath, for finding deer. This is a ritual to Yum Kaax so that deer become easier to find.

== Maya beliefs from Yum Kaax ==
Maya sorcerers have learned many secrets from Yum Kaax and these would be used to help one get better results while hunting. Some of the advice given was: When you go hunting, you must first offer Yum Kaax 5 jars of Balché or nine of chocozacan. To find game, create a candle of Copal and follow the flicker of the flame. To select your own private hunting ground, kill a deer and cut off its head and then drag the head around the hunting ground and bury the head with its liver – the area that you have dragged the head over will become your own private hunting ground.

== Bibliography ==
- Muntsch, Albert (January–April 1943). "Some Magico-Religious Observances of the Present-Day Maya Indians of British Honduras and Yucatan". Primitive Man. 16 (1–2). The George Washington University Institute for Ethnographic Research: 31–43. doi:10.2307/3316355. JSTOR 3316355.
- Spence, Lewis (February 1926). "The Gods of the Maya". The Open Court. 60 (2): 65–81.
- Steele, R. L. (1977). "Dying, Death, and Bereavement Among the Maya Indians of Mesoamerica: A Study in Anthropological Psychology". American Psychologist. 32 (12): 1060–1068. doi:10.1037/0003-066X.32.12.1060. PMID 596713.
- Thompson, J. Eric (1927). The Civilization of the Mayas. Leaflet. Vol. 25. Field Museum of Natural History.
- Thompson, J. Eric (1930). Laufer, Berthold (ed.). "Ethnology of the Mayas of southern and central British Honduras". Fieldiana. Anthropological Series. 17 (2). Chicago: Field Museum of Natural History.
- Thompson, J. Eric S. (1970). Maya History and Religion. The Civilization of the American Indian. Vol. 99. Norman: University of Oklahoma Press. ISBN 0-8061-0884-3.
