= Myshkin (surname) =

Myshkin (Мы́шкин) is a Russian-language surname, sometimes transliterated as Mishkin although the latter word has a different origin. "Myshkin" is the possessive case of the Russian word myshka, the diminutive of 'mouse'.

Notable people with this surname include:

- Anatoly Myshkin (b. 1954), Soviet and Russian basketball player
- Ippolit Myshkin (1848–1885), Russian revolutionary
- Tanya Myshkin (born 1961), Australian printmaker
- Maria Myshkina (1844–1894), Russian writer
- Vladimir Myshkin (b. 1955), Soviet and Russian ice hockey goaltender

== Fictional characters ==
- Prince Myshkin, character in Dostoevsky's novel The Idiot
- Maxim Komar-Myshkin, fictional artist, a creation of Roee Rosen, Israeli multidisciplinary artist, writer and filmmaker

== See also ==
- Mishkin, surname
- Miskin (disambiguation)
