= Valery Slauk =

Belarusian graphic artist, illustrator, and academic

Valery Petrovich Slauk (Belarusian: Валерый Пятровіч Слаук / Славук; born 1947) is a Belarusian graphic artist, book illustrator, and professor at the Belarusian Academy of Arts. His works are exhibited in the National Art Museum of Belarus and in several museums abroad.

== Awards and decorations ==
Slauk has been recipient of multiple awards, including:

- 2015: The title of Honored Worker of Arts of the Republic of Belarus
- 2010: Medal of Francysk Skaryna
