= Permian bronze casts =

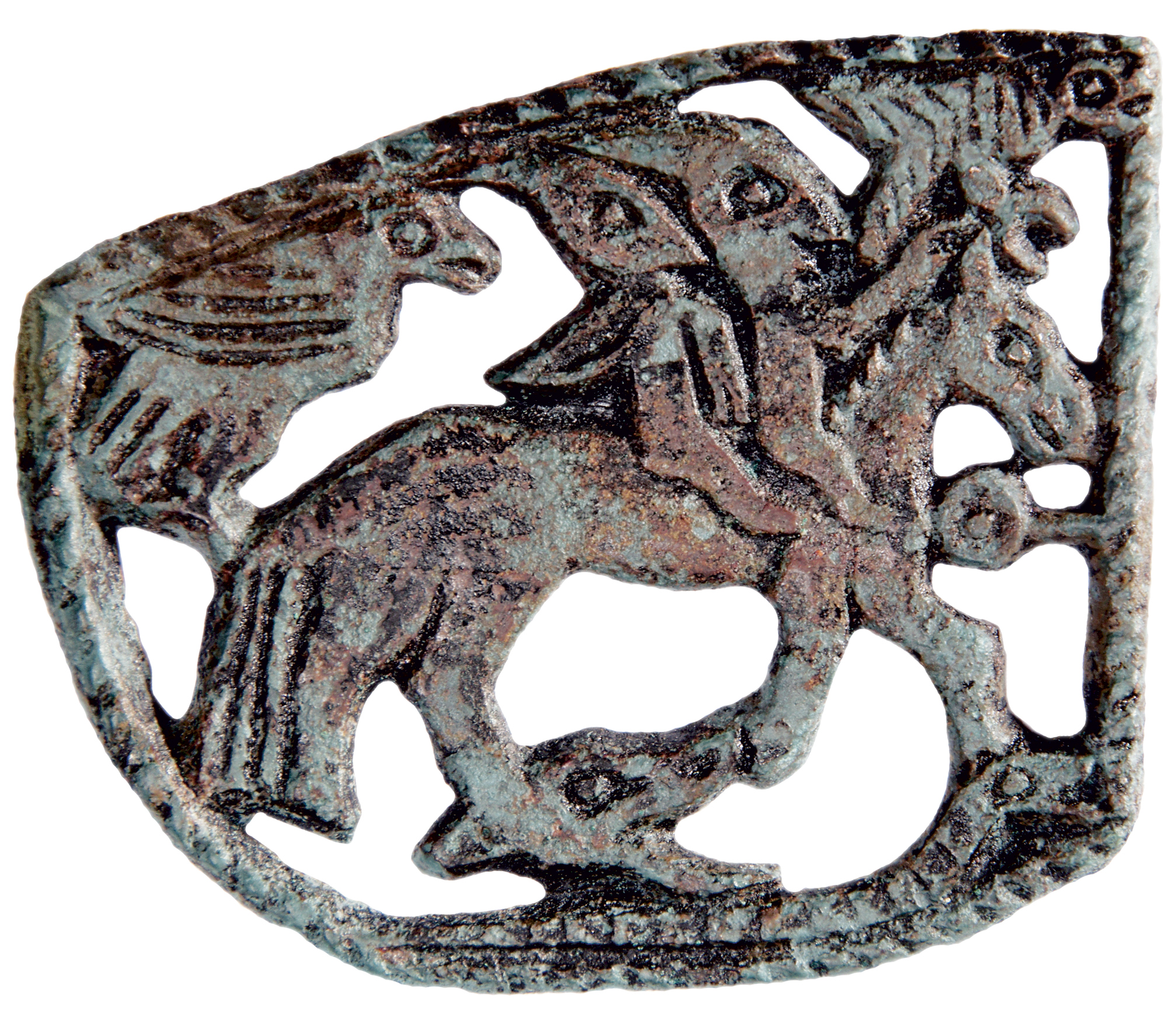
Two anthropomorphic figures on a horse. The horse stands on the snake. The group is accompanied by birds. Ahead of the horse is the sign of the sun. 10th century.

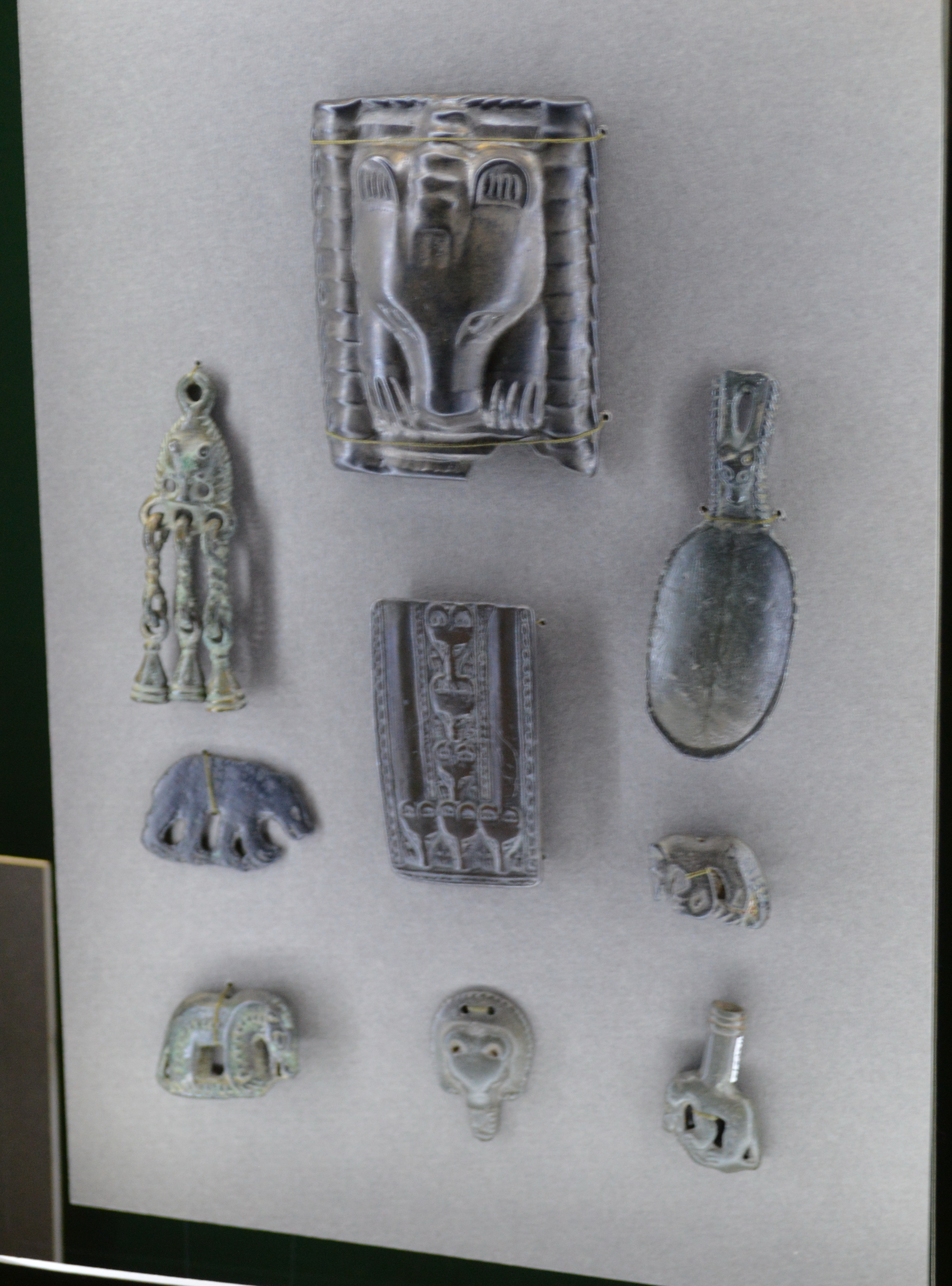
Bears figures.

Permian bronze casts – Permic and Western Siberian animal style cult cast figurines – were the predominant form of Finno-Ugric toreutics of the 3rd–12th centuries CE. It was spread throughout a large area of forests of the north-eastern Urals and western Siberia from the basins of the Kama and Vyatka to the Ob. In the Middle Ages, these territories were inhabited mostly by the Ugrian tribes, ancestors of the present day Hungarians and Ob-Ugrians – the Khanty and the Mansi people. Their style is referred to as the "Permian animal style".

The first collections of these works of arts and their scholarly research date back to the end of the 19th century. Despite over a century of research into the field, Perm animal style still remains one of the most mysterious cultural phenomena of Eurasia. This can be explained by the absence of written tradition of its creators and lack of external historic evidence about the creators of the bronze images in the heyday of the animal style. The golden age of cult metallurgy began immediately after the period of the Great Migrations (4–5th centuries CE) and continued in the epoch of the medieval Urals and Siberia of 6–11th centuries CE. A large collection was amassed by the Stroganov family in Perm.

Researchers point to the influence of Scytho-Sarmatian animal style on the development of cult toreutics of the forests of the north: famous animal battle scenes, vertical model of the Universe in the form of three worlds – three levels of the plaques and the cult of the great mother-goddess are present in both styles. Perm animal style objects include metalwork of bronze with the usage of single- or double-sided forms for casting, bone and wooden carvings, engravings on metal and bone objects. Figures depicted on the images are elks, rain-deers, bears, fur-bearing and other types of animals, horses, different waterfowl and birds of prey, snakes, insects and a number of "complex creatures" of mixed nature (hybrids), mixed zoomorphic and anthropomorphic half-human creatures; there are also a number of images of horsemen. The stories, which the Perm animal style plaques tell, are numerous and diverse.The objects are found in the hoards, on the sites of the temples, among the skeletons, in burials, as part of sacrificial complexes or on the sites of metallurgical workshops. Most of the bronze artifacts were used as a cult figures for the sacred rites.

The sculptural embodiment of a spirit or an ancestor is not the monument for him, neither it is the place where the spirit dwells, but the deity itself. Wooden or metal ingots and the spirits or souls cocooned inside them are inseparable unit, so that the figurine becomes a divine piece of wood or metal. Kustaa Fredrik Karjalainen uses the Khanty notion of "tonx" to describe the idea of one of human souls. The images were made for "tonx". "After a piece of wood has been given a shape of a human or after a tin cast, having a certain human form, has hardened, it is important to transfer or to indwell in it a "tonx" of the spirit which the figurine depicts, and only after that the image becomes a "tonx" to which necessary honours can be given". The specialists believe that for making figurines the real wooden models were used which were painted or rubbed with the sacrificial blood.

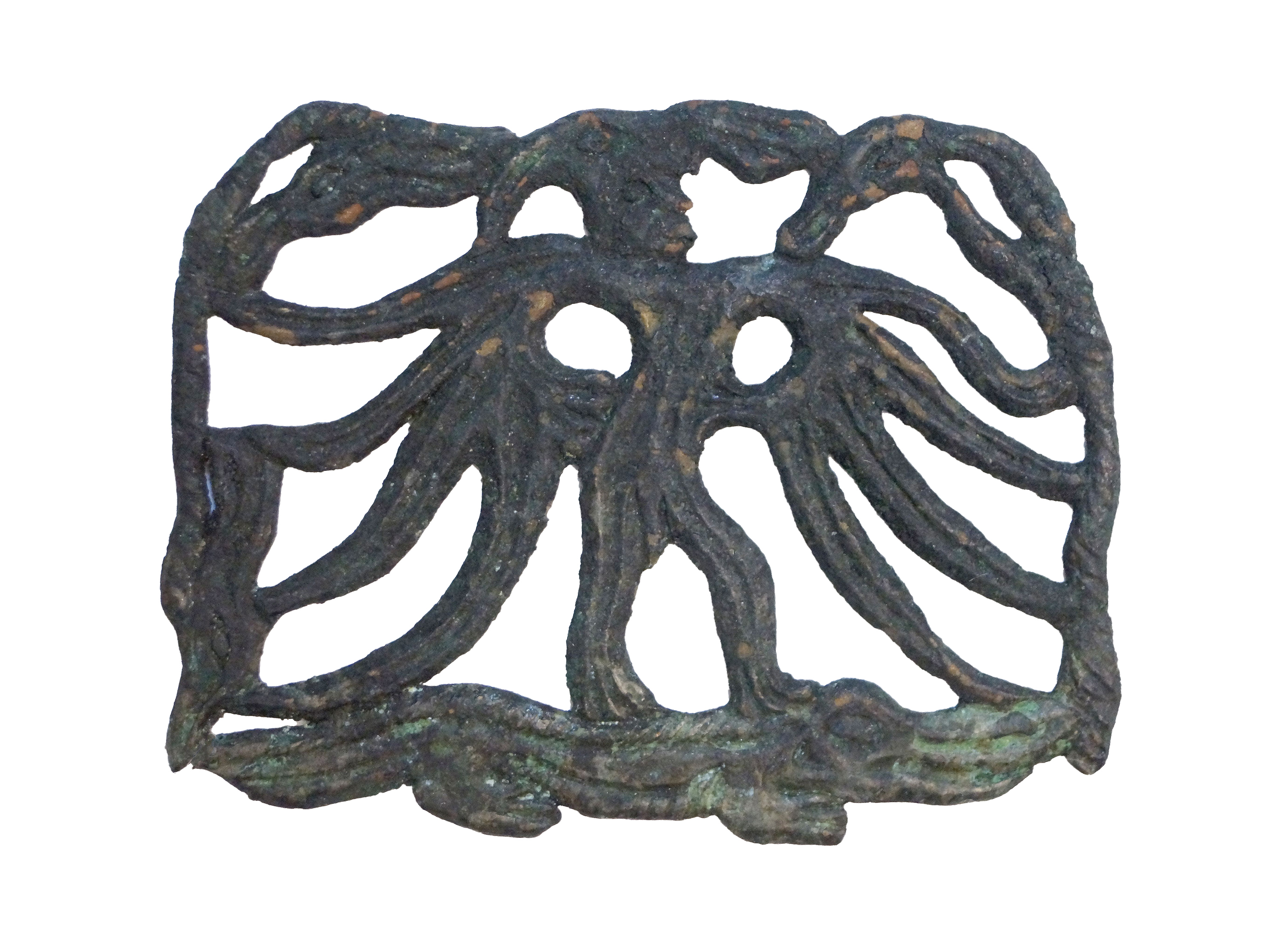
Permian Animal style: Elk-headed man on the lizard. 8th century

Raw material for copper casting were cupriferous sandstones of the Upper Kama. The alloys mostly consisted of copper (up to 86%), tin (10–17%), sometimes zinc (up to 7%) and arsenic. In the first millennium CE in the Upper Kama, as well in other regions of European North-East and Ob region, the coppers used were high in tin and zinc.

The objects of the animal style are usually divided into two groups, according to their function and the sphere of usage. The first group is Perm-Pechora bronze open-work objects having worship purpose. Certain objects from this group have a complicated composition, a sophisticated story behind them and many-leveled structure. Most artistically expressive compositions are 3-leveled cosmological compositions with a goddess in the center. Upper level consists of the heads of elks, heavenly faces, and soul birds associated with the Higher World of heavenly creatures, middle level is an earthly world of people and animals. The ruler of the Middle world is a deity (mother goddess) depicted in the center, and an animal at her feet is as a rule hybrid animal consisting of parts of different terrestrial animals – it marks the borders of Lower invisible world. The hallmark of the Perm animal style is the images of elk peoples, and to be more precise, the image of man-bird-elk, found nowhere else in the territory of Eurasia.The second group is the Transural, Western-Siberia animal style. There are a lot of applied and decorative artifacts – decorations, including costume decorations – belt plates, buckles, clasps, bracelets with zoomorphic images, pendants, beads, pommels, sheaths, needle cases, ear-picks, stills and combs. Mythological stories could be seen on the plaques, depicting "complex animals" – mixed bears and fur-bearing animals, on figured pendants in the form of waterfowl, horses, in the images of birds of prey on the pommels.

According to the sphere of usage, cult metalwork objects can be divided into groups: for instance, the ones protecting against diseases (they were as a norm kept at home), the others – "spirits of the happiness" – bringing luck as a response to the sacrifices (they were inside community temples).The diversity of cult artifacts and mythological stories on the plaques presuppose the existence of developed mythology of the creators of the animal style. Perm Animal Style appeared on the territory of Scytho-Sarmatian world at the beginning of the first millennium CE and disappeared at the beginning of the second millennium, on the eve of the Mongolian invasions. The last traces of this civilization can be observed in the traditional culture of the Ob-Ugrians – the Khantys and the Mansis. Casting of objects for worship existed for over a thousand years and ensured the unity of the pagan world of the Urals and Western Siberia.

== Literature ==
- Eero Autio (2000). KOTKAT, HIRVET, KARHUT: PERMILÄISTÄ PRONSSITAIDETTA (Eagles, deer, bears: Permian bronze casts). Jyväskylä.
  - Enn Ernits (December 2001). "Eero Autio, KOTKAT, HIRVET, KARHUT: PERMILÄISTÄ PRONSSITAIDETTA (Eagles, deer, bears: Permian bronze casts)" (PDF). Folklore (Review). Vol. 18, 19. pp. 238–239.
