= Ovinnik =

Slavic malevolent spirit

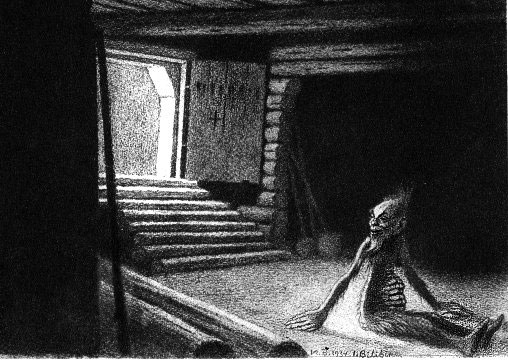
Ovinnik by Ivan Bilibin

The Ovinnik (Russian: Овинник), Joŭnik or Jovnik (Belarusian: Ёўнік) is a malevolent spirit of the threshing house in Slavic folklore whose name derived from ovin 'barn'. He is prone to burning down the threshing houses by setting fire to the grain. To placate him, peasants would offer him roosters and bliny. On New Year's Eve, the touch of an Ovinnik would determine their fortune for the New Year. A warm touch meant good luck and fortune, while a cold touch meant unhappiness.

== See also ==
- Bannik
- Domovoi
- Slavic mythology
