= Domovoy =

Slavic protective household spirit of a given lineage

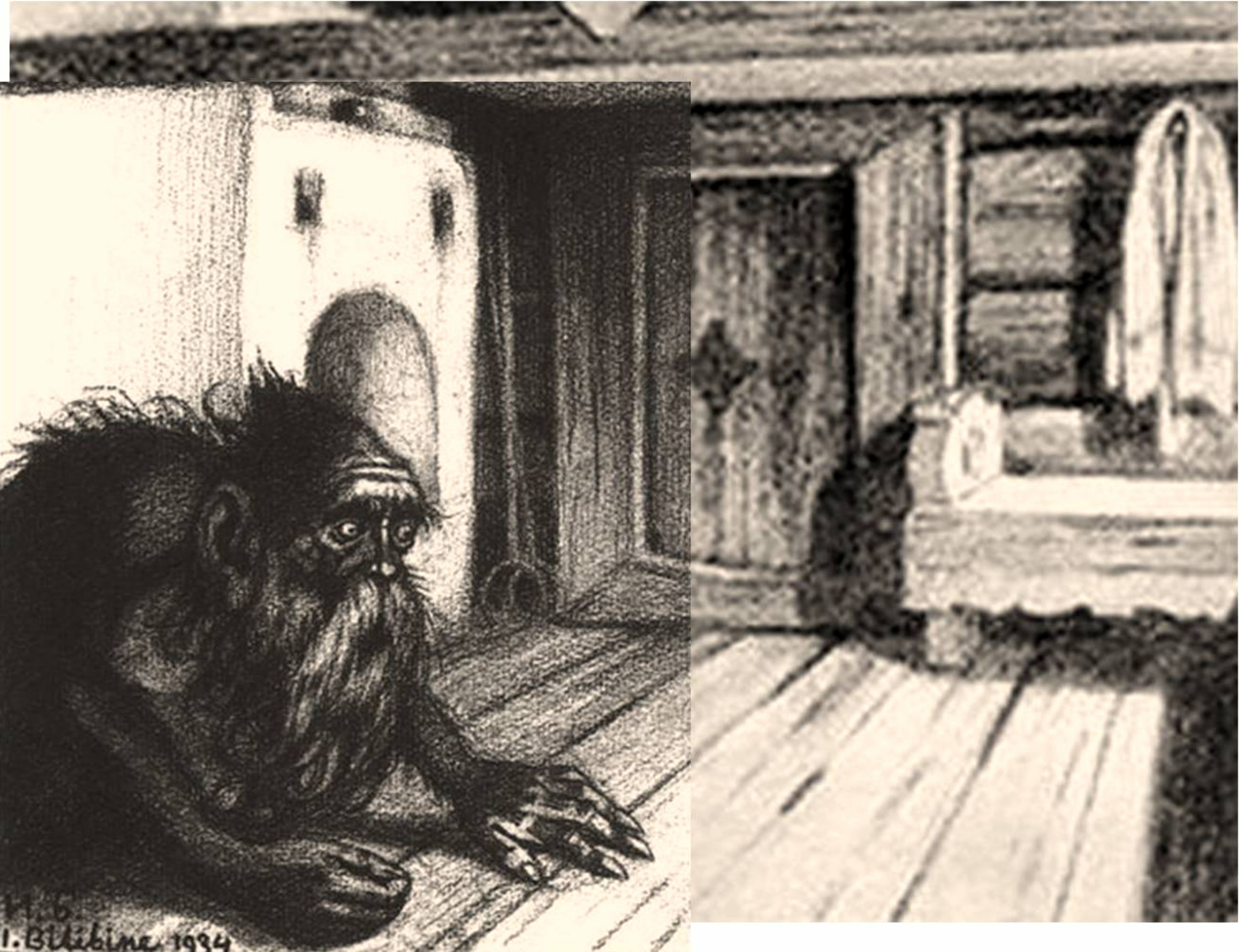
Domovyk, by Ivan Bilibin (1934)

In the Slavic religious tradition, Domovyk (Ukrainian: Домовик, literally "[the one] of the household"; also spelled Domovoi, Domovoj, and known as Polish: Domowik, Serbian: Домовик (Domovik) and Belarusian: Дамавік (Damavik), Russian: Домовой (Domovoy) is the household spirit of a given kin. According to the prominent Ukrainian writer and ethnographer Ivan Nechuy-Levytsky in his foundational study The Worldview of the Ukrainian People (1876), the Domovyk (often locally referred to as hospodar, meaning "master") is a personification of the ancestral line and the benevolent guardian of the domestic hearth rather than an evil spirit. In Ukrainian mythology and regional Slavic demonology, he is traditionally viewed as a singular, protective deity of the household, closely bound to the pre-Christian cult of ancestors. The Domovyk expresses himself through various domestic roles and functions, overseeing the homestead, protecting the cattle, guarding the family from misfortune, and ensuring overall prosperity.

== Etymology and belief ==
The term Domovyk comes from the Indo-European root *dom, which is shared by many words in the semantic field of "abode", "domain" in the Indo-European languages (cf. Latin domus, "house"). The Domovyk have been compared to the Roman Di Penates, the genii of the family. Helmold (c. 1120–1177), in his Chronica Slavorum, alluded to the widespread worship of penates among the Elbe Slavs. In the Chronica Boemorum of Cosmas of Prague (c. 1045–1125) it is written that Czech, one of the three mythical forefathers of the Slavs, brought the statues of the penates on his shoulders to the new country, and, resting on the mountain of the Rzip, said to his fellows:

Rise, good friends, and make an offering to your penates, for it is their help that has brought you to this new country destined for you by Fate ages ago.

The Domovyk are believed to protect the well-being of a kin in any of its aspects. They are very protective towards the children and the animals of the house, constantly looking after them. These gods are often represented as fighting with one another, to protect and make grow the welfare of their kin. In such warfare, the Domovyk of the eventual winner family is believed to take possession of the household of the vanquished rivals.

They are believed to share the joys and the sorrows of the family, and to be able to forebode and warn about future events, such as the imminent death of a kindred person, plagues, wars or other calamities which threaten the welfare of the kin. The Domovyk become angry and reveal their demonic aspect if the family is corrupted by bad behaviour and language. In this case, the god may even quit and leave the kin unprotected against illness and calamity.

== Iconography and worship ==
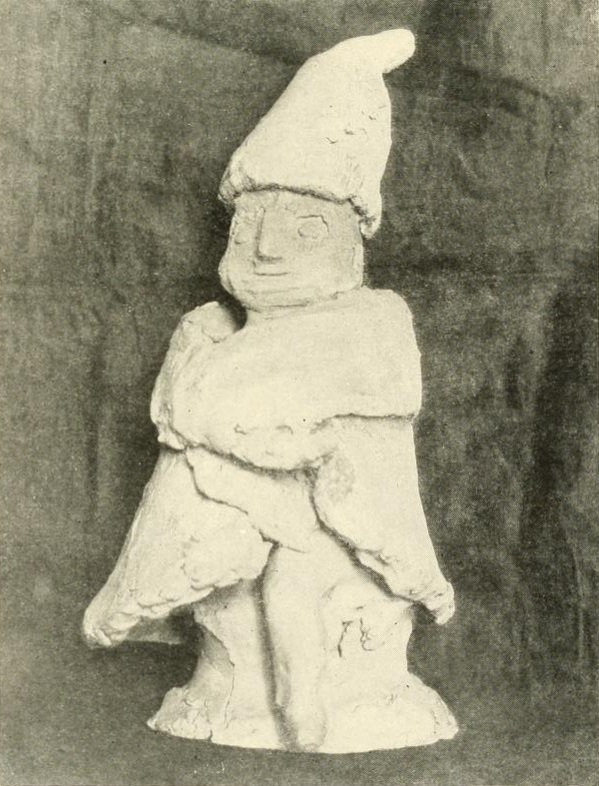
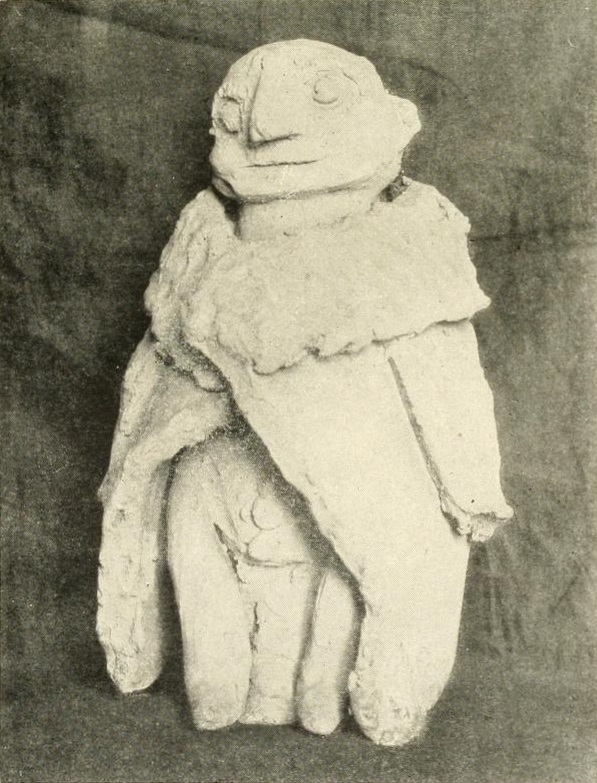
Silesian statuettes of Domovik, photographed in the early 20th century.

The Domovyk is usually represented as an old, grey-haired man with flashing eyes. He may manifest in the form of animals, such as cats, dogs or bears, but also as the master of the house or a departed ancestor of the given family, sometimes provided with a tail and little horns. In some traditions the Domovyk are symbolised as snakes. Household gods were represented by the Slavs as statuettes, made of clay or stone, which were placed in niches near the house's door, and later on the mantelpieces above the ovens. They were attired in the distinct costume of the tribe to which the kin belonged.

Sacrifices in honour of the Domovyk are practised to make him participate in the life of the kin, and to appease and reconcile him in the case of anger. These include the offering of what is left of the evening meal, or, in cases of great anger, the sacrifice of a cock at midnight and the sprinkling of the nooks and corners of the common hall or the courtyard with the animal's blood. Otherwise, a slice of bread strewn with salt and wrapped in a white cloth is offered in the hall or the courtyard while the members of the kin bow towards the four directions reciting prayers to the Domovyk.

The Domovyk is believed to be somehow connected with the house building itself, so sacrifices are also practised when a family moved to a newly built house to invite the god to inhabit it. In this case, a hen and the first slice of bread cut for the first dinner in the new house are offered to the god and buried in the courtyard, reciting the formula:

Our supporter, come into the new house to eat bread and obey your new master.

Similar rituals are practised to invite a Domovyk to transfer from one house to another, and to welcome him.

== Other household deities ==
Other household gods, or expressions of the Domovyk, are:

- Dvorovoy – tutelary deity of the courtyard
- Bannik – "Bath Spirit", the tutelary deity of the private or public bathhouses, (Note: Slavic bathhouses (banya) – which are like saunas, with an inner steaming room and an outer changing room – have their tutelary god, Bannik. A Slavic bathhouse is a place where traditionally women gave birth and practised divination, thus a receptacle of vital forces. The third or fourth firing is dedicated to Bannik, who is invited to the bathhouse with his forest spirits. In the bathhouse, Bannik is traditionally consulted as he is considered able to forebode the future.) who corresponds to the Komi Pyvsiansa
- Ovinnik (Belarusian: Joŭnik) – "Threshing Barn Spirit"
- Prigirstitis – known for his fine hearing
- Krimba – household goddess among the Bohemians
- The lizard-shaped Giwoitis

== Alternative naming ==
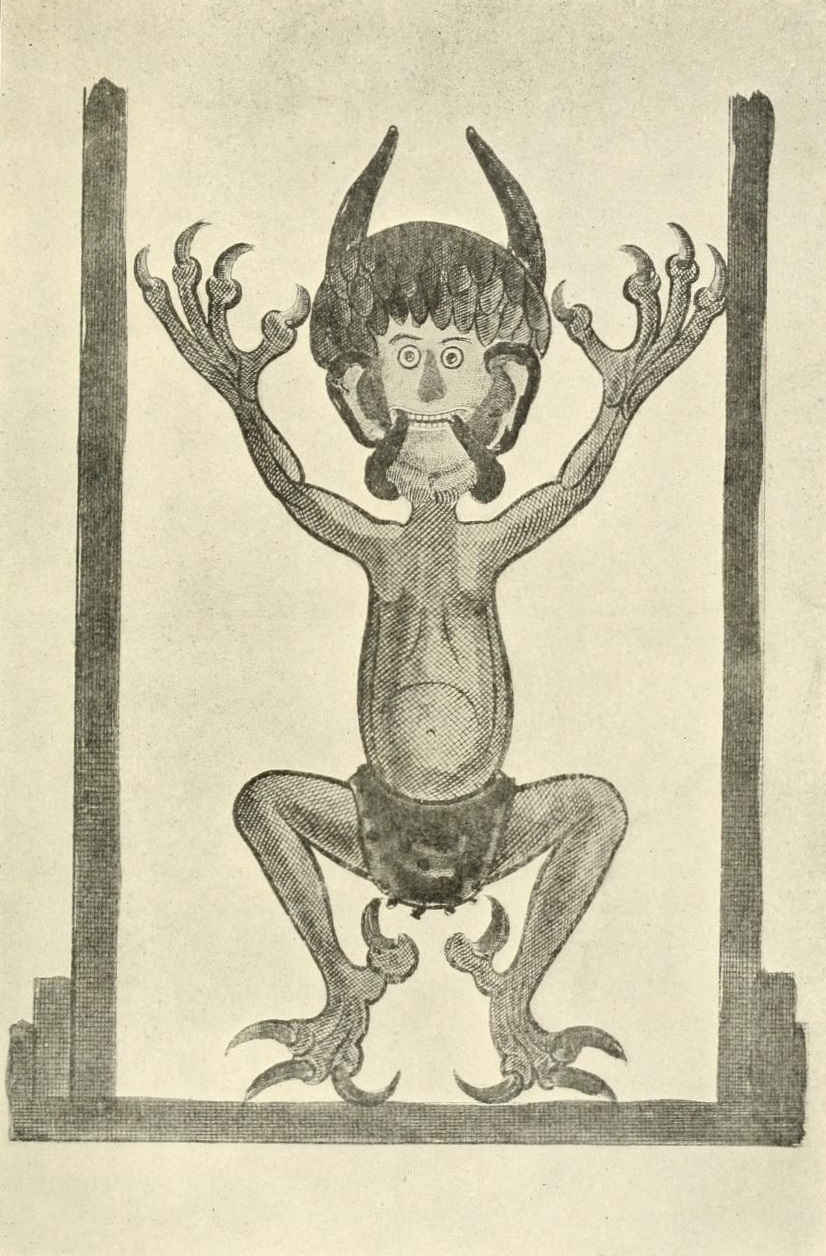
Šetek or Skřítek, the Bohemian version of a household spirit in his Christianised representation as a hellish hobgoblin or demon.

Some English-speaking authors interpret the name Domovyk as "house elf".

The Slavic languages and their local forms have variations of the term Domovyk and alternative names to describe the household god, including:

- Děd, Dĕdek, Děduška (names of this form convey the concept of "grandfather", Czech)
- Did, Didko, Diduch, Domovyk (Ukrainian)
- Damavik (Belarusian)
- Dedek, Djadek
- Šetek, Šotek (Czech)
- Skřítek (Czech)
- Škrata, Škriatok (Slovak)
- Škrat, Škratek (Slovenian)
- Skrzatek, Skrzat, Skrzot (Polish)
- Chozyain, Chozyainuško (Russian) (meaning literally "master" and "little master")
- Stopan (Bulgarian)
- Domovníček, Hospodáříček (Czech)
- Domaći (Croatian)
- Zmek, Smok, Ćmok (snake form)

The female counterpart Domania can appear as:

- Domovykha (Russian: домовиха)
- Damavukha (Belarusian: дамавуха)
- Kikimora
- Marukha
- Volossatka

The household spirit may also be called Zhikharko (Russian: Жихарько in northern governorates of Russia. It is described as short, disheveled, with a big beard, good-natured, harmless and a big joker.

== See also ==
- Ancestor worship
- Hob (folklore) Anglo-Scots household spirit
- Brownie (folklore)
- Leshy
- Deities of Slavic religion
- Nisse (folklore)
- Gnome
- Haltija
- Kikimora
- Household deity
- Huldufólk
- Slavic paganism
- Slavic Native Faith
