= Antonio Núñez =

Antonio Núñez may refer to:

- Antonio Núñez (footballer) (born 1979), Spanish footballer
- Antonio Núñez Jiménez (1923–1998), Cuban scholar and politician

== See also ==
- António Nunes Ribeiro Sanches (1699–1783), Portuguese encyclopédiste
- Antonio Escobar Núñez (born 1976), Spanish musician
