= Steam shower =

Shower enclosure serving as a steam room

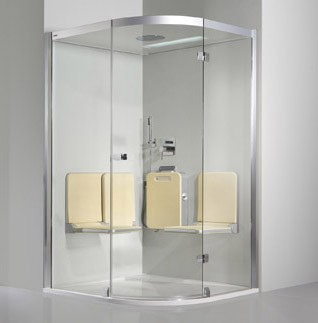
A steam shower

A steam shower is a type of bathing where a humidifying steam generator produces water vapor that is dispersed around a person's body. A steam shower is essentially a steam room that offers the typical features of a bathroom shower. Steam showers are generally found in self-contained enclosures that prevent the water vapour from escaping into the rest of the room, avoiding damage to drywall, paint, or wallpaper. Steam showers combine the functionality of a standard steam room with many additional features including a shower, FM radio and hydrotherapy. Steam showers are available in a variety of materials, including tile, acrylic, fiberglass, glass, stone, and wood.

== History ==
Steam showers have evolved from the steambath which is thought to have been invented during the height of the Roman Empire. Ancient Roman baths served many community and social functions within Roman society. These Roman baths were supplied by natural hot springs from beneath the ground.

== Features ==
A steam shower could be a regular shower with the added steam feature that is powered by a steam generator. In addition to plain steam, modern steam showers provide additional features such as foot massagers, ceiling rain showers, television, radios, telephones, audio input from an MP3 or CD player, chromatherapy or aromatherapy. A steam shower can use solar thermal technology and lessen the electricity bill drastically by heating the water with the sun.

== Health effects ==
Over the years, steam has been utilized for a variety of different health purposes. The way people generate their steam has changed and steam showers can deliver a more intense burst of steam than a steam room or range top. Some physiotherapy experts have begun to incorporate steam into their rehabilitation practices. Although a cure has never originated for the common cold, steam is often cited as a reliable way to temporarily alleviate the symptoms.

Some medical professionals recommend steam baths as a way to diminish the pain and stiffness associated with ankylosing spondylitis and rheumatoid arthritis.

Steam showers may cause health effects similar to those associated with sauna.

== See also ==
- Banya (sauna) – Russian steam bath with a wood stove
- Sauna – Type of bathhouse
- Solar hot water – Use of sunlight for water heating with a solar thermal collector
- Steam room – Bath facility
- Steambath – Bath facility
