= Manuel Curado =

Portuguese writer and philosopher

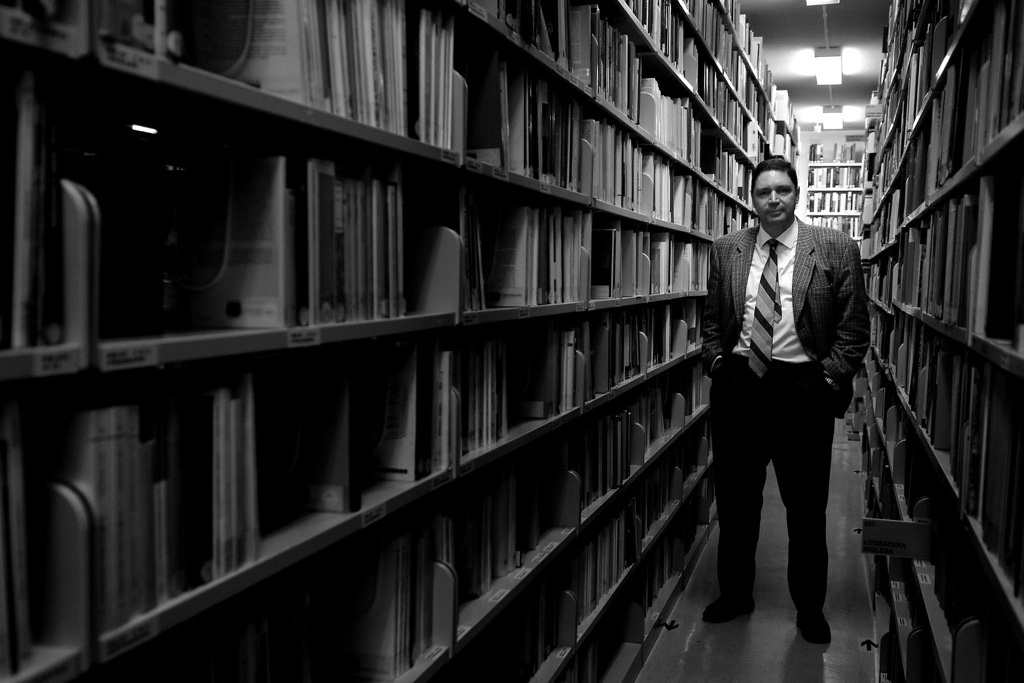
Manuel Curado

Manuel Curado (born 1967) is a Portuguese essayist and philosopher dedicated to Biomedical Ethics, Philosophy of mind. He has worked on the following issues: the intellectual history of the idea of a universal language and the idea of machine translation, or automatic translation, the problem of human consciousness and its relationship with the brain, the relationship between science and religion, studies about the European and Portuguese intellectual history, academic editions of works by authors such the Eighteenth-century mathematician José Maria Dantas Pereira, the logician Edmundo Curvelo, and others, the history of Psychiatry and history of the Portuguese Jewish heritage in Medicine and Philosophy (namely, the work of medical doctors Isaac Samuda and Jacob de Castro Sarmento), and the history of literary representations of mental life.

Professor at the University of Minho (Braga, North of Portugal), Auditor of National Defence, Doctor cum laude from the University of Salamanca, MA from the New University of Lisbon. He graduated from the Catholic University of Portugal (Lisbon). Holder of the Senior Management Course for Public Administration (CADAP). He was a visiting professor in Moscow, Russia (MGIMO and MGLU) and in Padua, Italy (Università degli Studi di Padova).

== Philosophical thought ==
Manuel Curado, in his PhD thesis (The Hard Problem of Consciousness) and in his more popular book Mysterious Light: Consciousness in the Physical World, solves and dissolves the philosophical problem known as the hard problem of consciousness. The author formulates the hard problem of human consciousness as follows: why there is consciousness in the physical world when one could think about a world without consciousness at all? The philosopher's answer to this question contends a solution by dissolving the very problem. The argument is developed around the possibility of overcoming the natural consciousness through scientific knowledge in order to produce artificial consciousness. According to the author, the problem is not going to be completely and preternaturally resolved because one has clear answers about what consciousness really is, or about what is the role of consciousness in the physical world, or about what is the causal power of consciousness, or about what is the relationship of consciousness to the brain, but because there is a growing scientific capacity to produce consciousness artificially. The philosopher envisions a future time when it will be impossible to distinguish between natural consciousness and artificially produced consciousness. This very impossibility to distinguish is interpreted as a normal epistemic condition that occurs in many other situations.

The most original philosophical thought of this philosopher is concerned with the relations between believers and the object of their faith or religious belief. The argument is developed in two ways. The relationship between the believer and God must be based on the assumption that God exists. However, this assumption does not imply necessarily the love of God or the respect of God. The relationship between God and humans is conceived in unique ways. Manuel Curado sees God as an object in the world, alongside predators against whom humans fought in their evolutionary past, along with the physical objects of nature, alongside the preternatural objects (inexplicable situations that occur rarely in history, like anomalies or lights in the sky) and alongside supernatural beings or objects (represented in many literary, religious, philosophical and testimonial ways from the very beginning of civilization). The philosopher's thesis is that humans are rivals or enemies of God and of all other beings that exist in the physical, preternatural and supernatural worlds. The most important point of his argument is the notion of interest. His essays often formulate this question: what is the true interest of human beings? Is it only the understanding of the world? It is being loved by a celestial father? Is it the search for meaning? Is it to survive in a hostile world? Or is it to invent themselves, dominating all other beings, including, of course, hypothetical supernatural beings?

Another way of thinking about the relationship between human beings and the objects that exist in the world is modern science. Manuel Curado argues that the interpretation that is usually offered about the scope and meaning of modern scientific activity is very poor. From his point of view, to try to understand the world is a very poor description of this scientific activity. The scientists describe the world, of course, but also invent and create new objects. Curado proposes a philosophical calculus of the ratio there is between the natural world and the artificial world. From his point of view, the natural world is getting smaller every day. He concludes from this situation that the radical interest of modern science is the creation of artificial worlds. As this trend grows in scope, the future will see the completion of this project. The conclusion he draws is that the ultimate concern of human beings is competing with God, not only in the neutral way of understanding the work of God. These ideas were presented in the essay "The Future of God", part of the edited book Why God If We Do Have Science?

== Publications ==
Author of many books, namely The Myth of the Automatic Translation (Braga, Universidade do Minho / CEHUM, 2000), Mysterious Light: Consciousness in the Physical World (Famalicão, Quasi, 2007), Biomedical Law: The Portuguese Legislation (Lisbon, Quid Juris, 2008), Why God If We Do Have Science? (Porto, Fronteira do Caos, 2009). Editor of the following books: Consciousness and Cognition (Braga, Faculty of Philosophy / UCP, 2004), Mind, Self and Consciousness (Braga, Faculty of Philosophy / UCP, 2007), Italian Letters of Luis Antonio Verney (Lisbon, Sílabo, 2008), Transparent Persons: Current issues in Bioethics (Coimbra, Almedina, 2008) and the God in the University: What Portuguese Academics Do Think About God? (Porto, Fronteira do Caos, 2011), "Collected Works of Edmundo Curvelo" (Lisboa, Fundação Calouste Gulbenkian, 2013).
