= Estrangeirado =

17th and 18th century Portuguese intellectuals

Estrangeirados (European Portuguese pronunciation: [iʃtɾɐ̃ʒɐjˈɾaðuʃ]) were, in the history of Portugal, Portuguese intellectuals who, in the late 17th century and particularly in the 18th century, strove to introduce the ideas of the Scientific Revolution and the Enlightenment, as well as other foreign ideas to Portugal.

== Etymology ==
Estrangeirado (meaning "admirer, cultivator of what is foreign") comes from the Portuguese estrangeiro, meaning foreign. This is because the ideas these people tried to inculcate in Portuguese society were, for the most part, foreign in origin.

== Estrangeirados ==
- Luís da Cunha
- Luís António Verney
- Alexandre de Gusmão
- Félix Avelar Brotero
- Jacob de Castro Sarmento
- Sebastião José de Carvalho e Melo, 1st Marquis of Pombal
- António Nunes Ribeiro Sanches
