= Sauna whisk =

Broom used for bathing in saunas or banyas

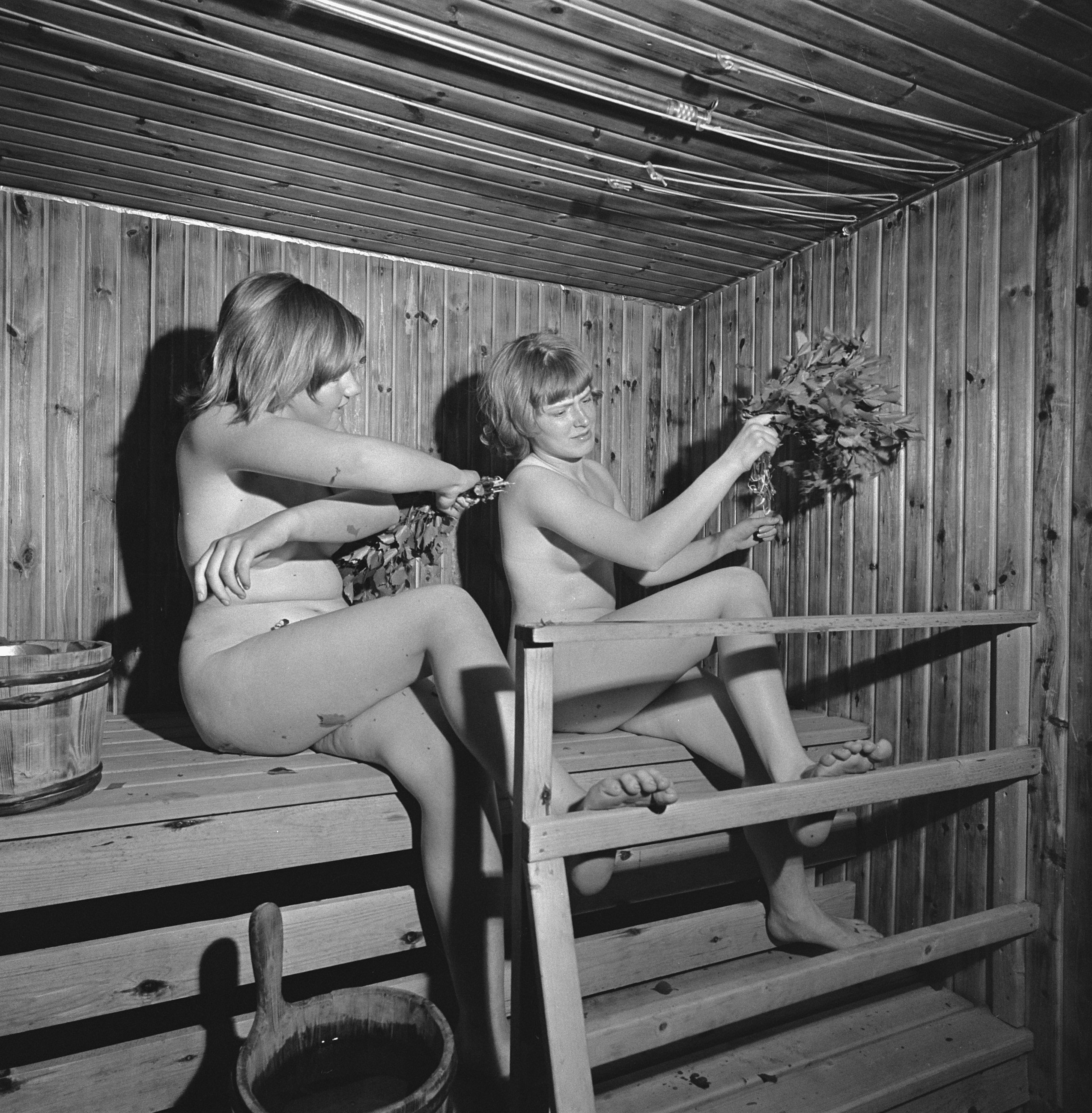
Women in a Finnish sauna with vihtas, 1967, Finland

A sauna whisk (Estonian: viht; Finnish: vasta or vihta; Latvian: pirtsslota; Lithuanian: vanta; Russian: банный веник, IPA: [ˈbanːɨj ˈvʲenʲɪk]) or bath broom is a besom, or broom, often made of silver birch branches and used for stimulating circulation while bathing in saunas and Russian banyas.

== Gallery ==
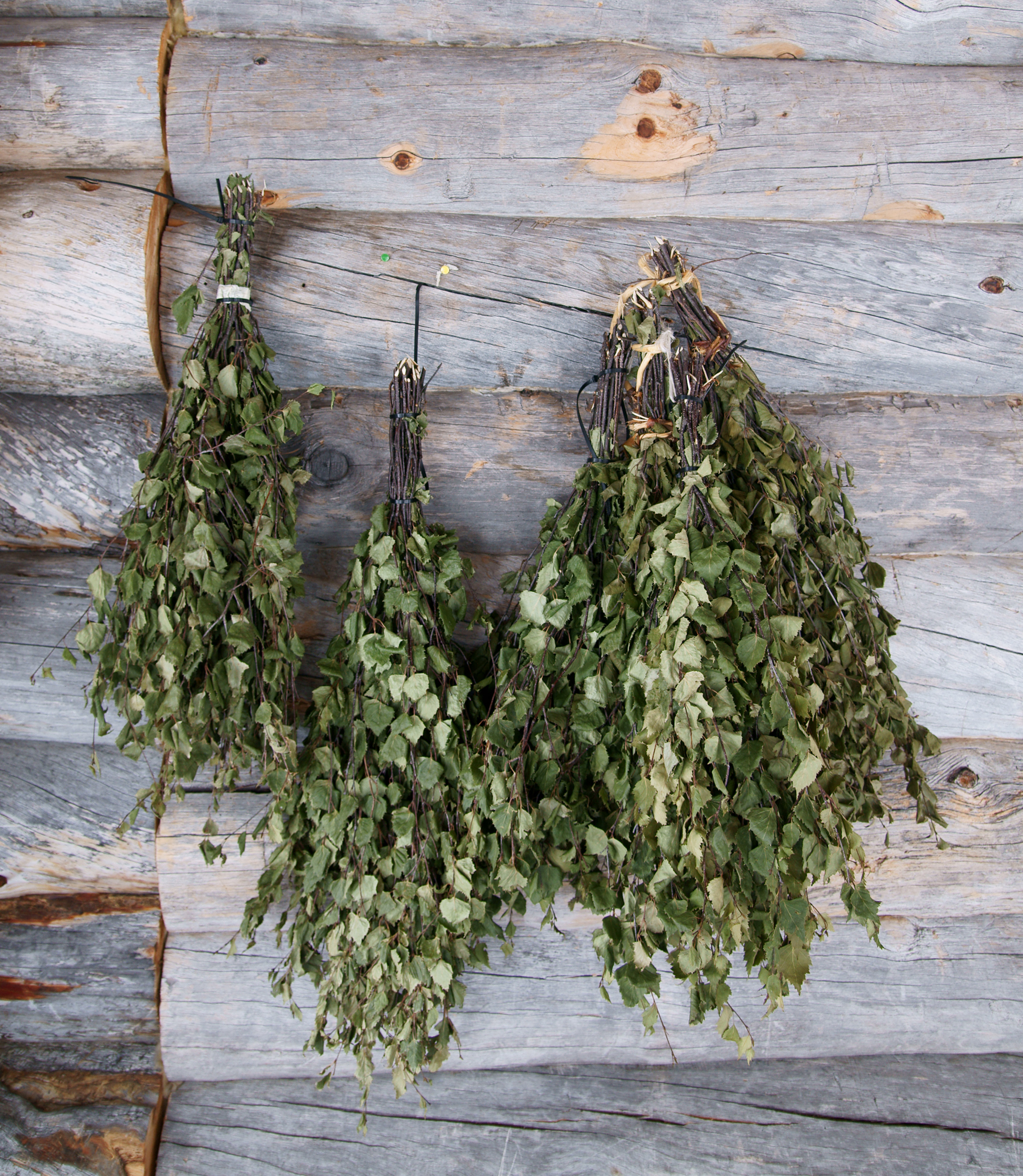
Finnish birch vihta

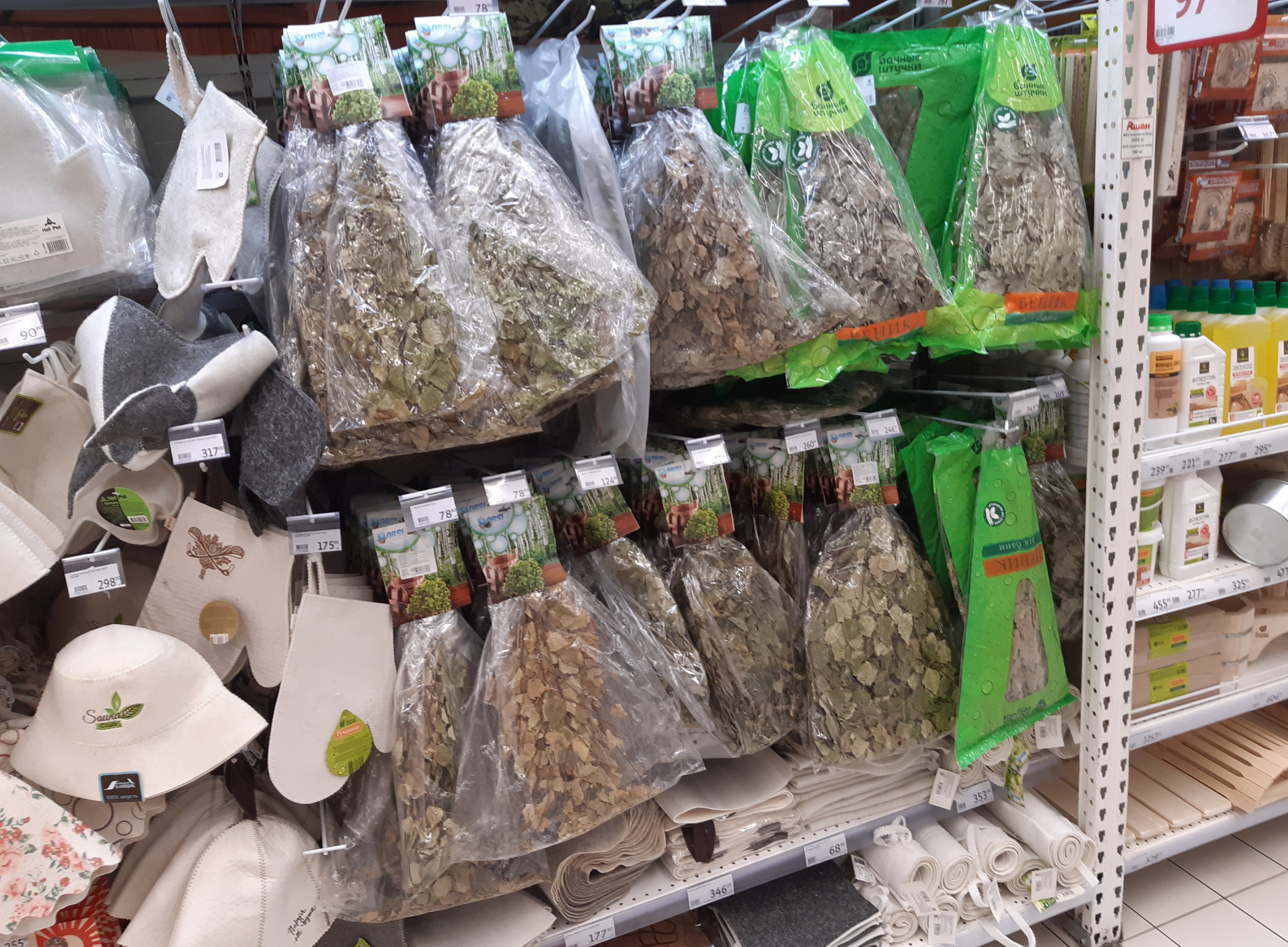
Sauna whisks in Russian store

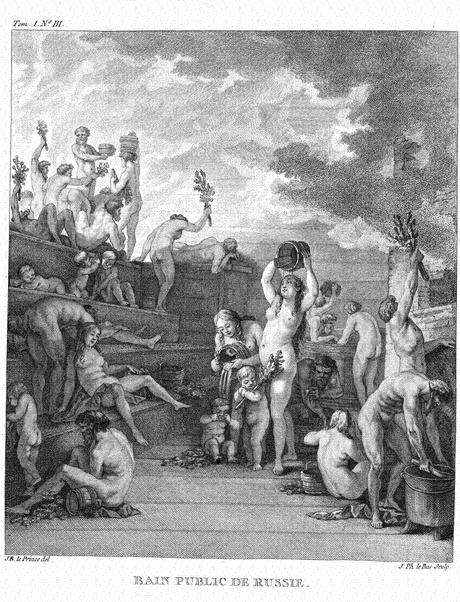
Jean-Baptiste Le Prince, a public banya (1760s)

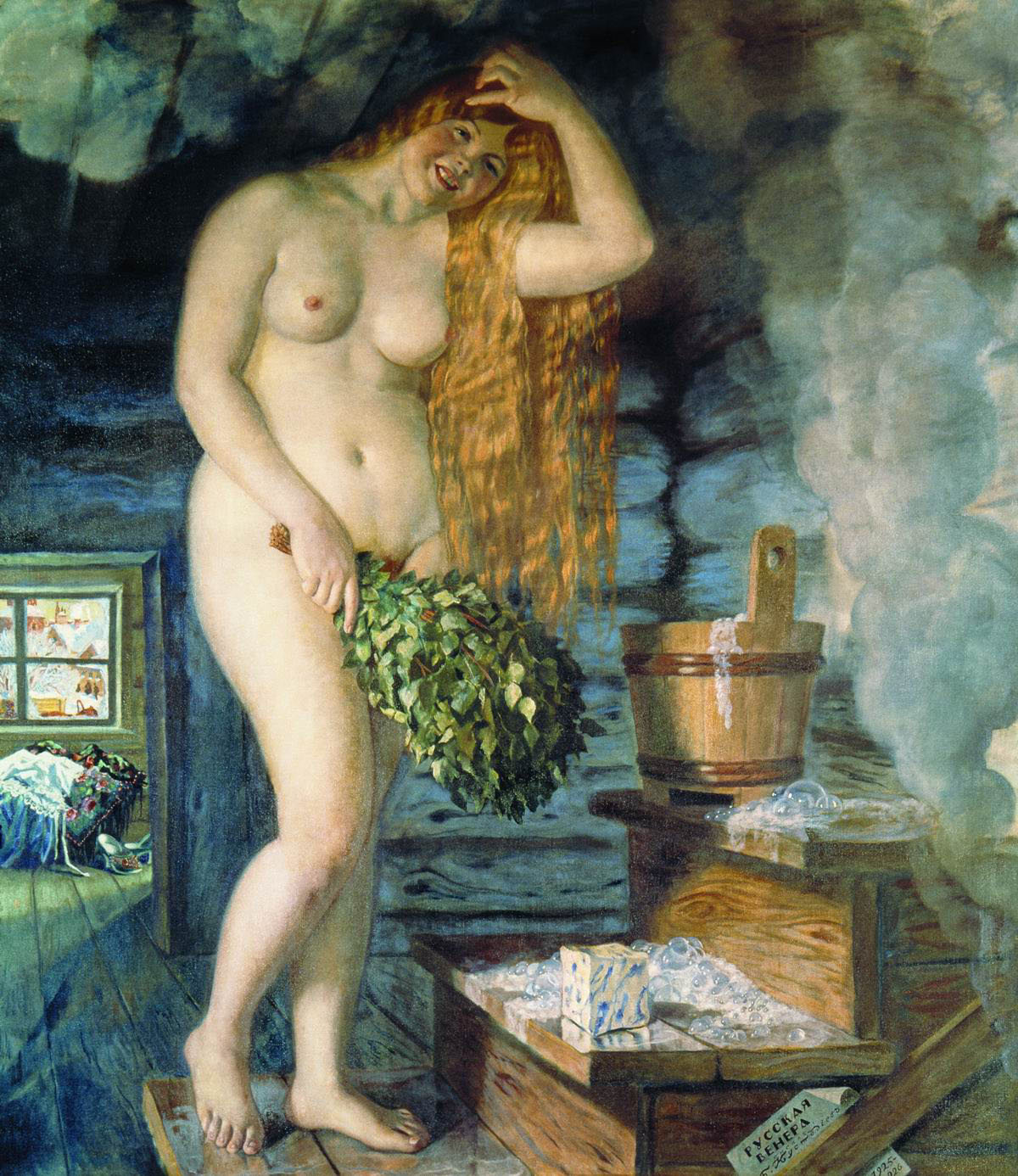
Boris Kustodiyev, Russian Venus (1925–1926)
