= Água de Inglaterra =

Portuguese medicinal water with quinine

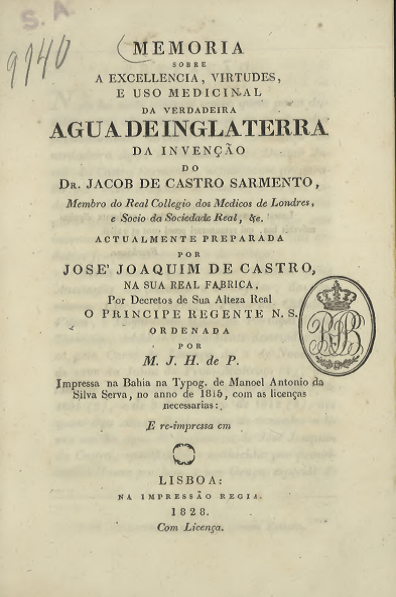
Cover of 1828 reprint of an 1803 booklet extolling the virtues of Água de Inglaterra

Água de Inglaterra (“Water from England” or “English Water”) was an example of the 'secret remedies' that were in vogue in Portugal during the 18th century. The name was used for various pharmaceutical preparations produced by several manufacturers from the end of the 17th century to the beginning of the 19th. In addition to the name, these preparations had in common the fact that the major therapeutic ingredient was the bark of the cinchona tree, from which quinine is obtained. Reference to the drug can be found in all Portuguese pharmacopeiae between 1681 and 1821.

== History ==
Água de Inglaterra was used for the treatment of malaria, which at the time was endemic in several regions of Portugal, including the Sado River valley and the Guadiana river. It was initially introduced from England in 1681 by Dr. Fernando Mendes, who “received a handsome gift from (King Dom Pedro) on condition that he should reveal to him the secret of his composition and withhold it from the public”. However, the popularity of the mixture was short-lived, either because it did not perform as claimed or because of the sudden death of Mendes. The medicine, which was produced through an infusion of the cinchona bark in alcohol, was subsequently popularised in the 1730s by Jacob de Castro Sarmento, a Portuguese doctor who lived in London from around 1720. Sarmento is believed to have left Portugal in order to freely practice the Jewish religion. He was elected to the Royal Society in 1730 and was the first Jew to obtain a Doctorate in Medicine from a British university. He was a pioneer in work to develop a smallpox vaccine.

Sarmento set up a profitable distribution network for Água de Inglaterra in Portugal and it became one of the most widely used drugs in the country. Others, including Castro Sarmento's nephew who claimed his uncle had shared the formula with him, produced their own counterfeit versions. The rights of the nephew's son in this regard were disputed in the Portuguese Parliament as late as 1821, having earlier been endorsed by the Prince Regent. Two pharmacists in Lisbon also produced their own versions.

With the isolation of quinine from the cinchona bark by Pelletier (1788–1842) and Caventou (1795–1877) it could be consumed as a salt. This resulted in Água de Inglaterra losing the importance it had had in the 18th century. A quinine-based product known as Água Inglesa (English Water) continues to be produced and sold in Brazil.
