= Banya (sauna) =

Russian steam bath with a wood stove

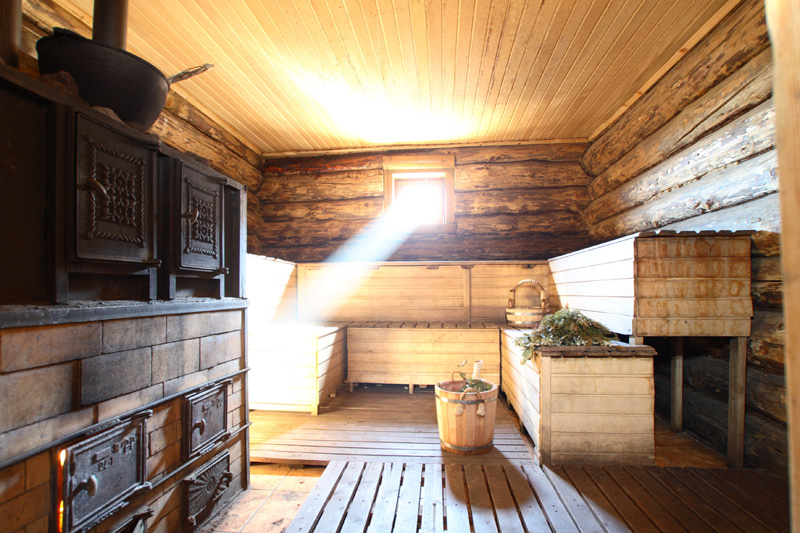
Interior of a modern Russian banya

The banya (Note: Also transliterated as banja or bania.) (Russian: баня, IPA: [ˈbanʲə]) is a traditional Russian steam bath that utilizes a wood stove. It is a significant part of Russian culture, and is typically conducted in a small room or building designed for dry or wet heat sessions. The high heat and steam cause perspiration.

In addition to its use as a steam bath, the term banya can also refer to a public bathhouse in the Russian language. The most historically renowned of these is the Sanduny (Sandunovskie bani). The banya has been depicted in various forms of Russian art and literature, reflecting its cultural significance and widespread use.

== Etymology ==
The Russian word баня is derived from Proto-Slavic *baňa, which is likely a loanword from Vulgar Latin *bāneum (proper word being balneum).

== History ==
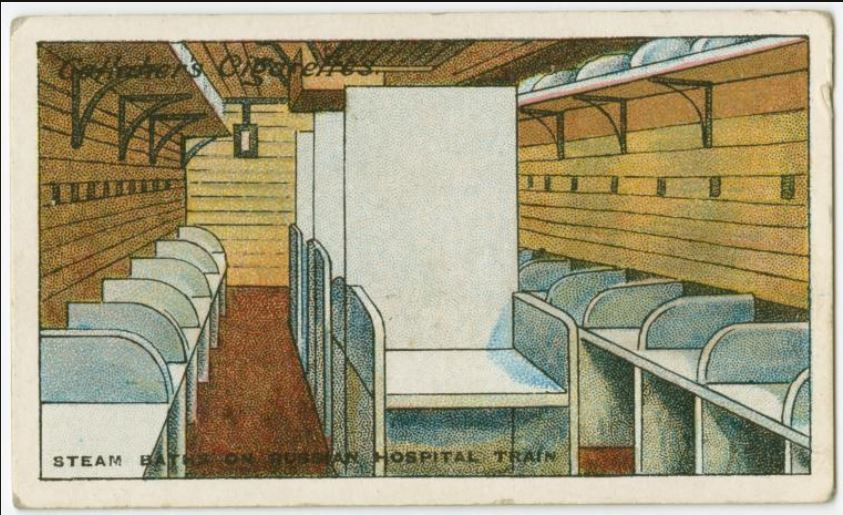
Steam bath on Russian hospital train used in World War I

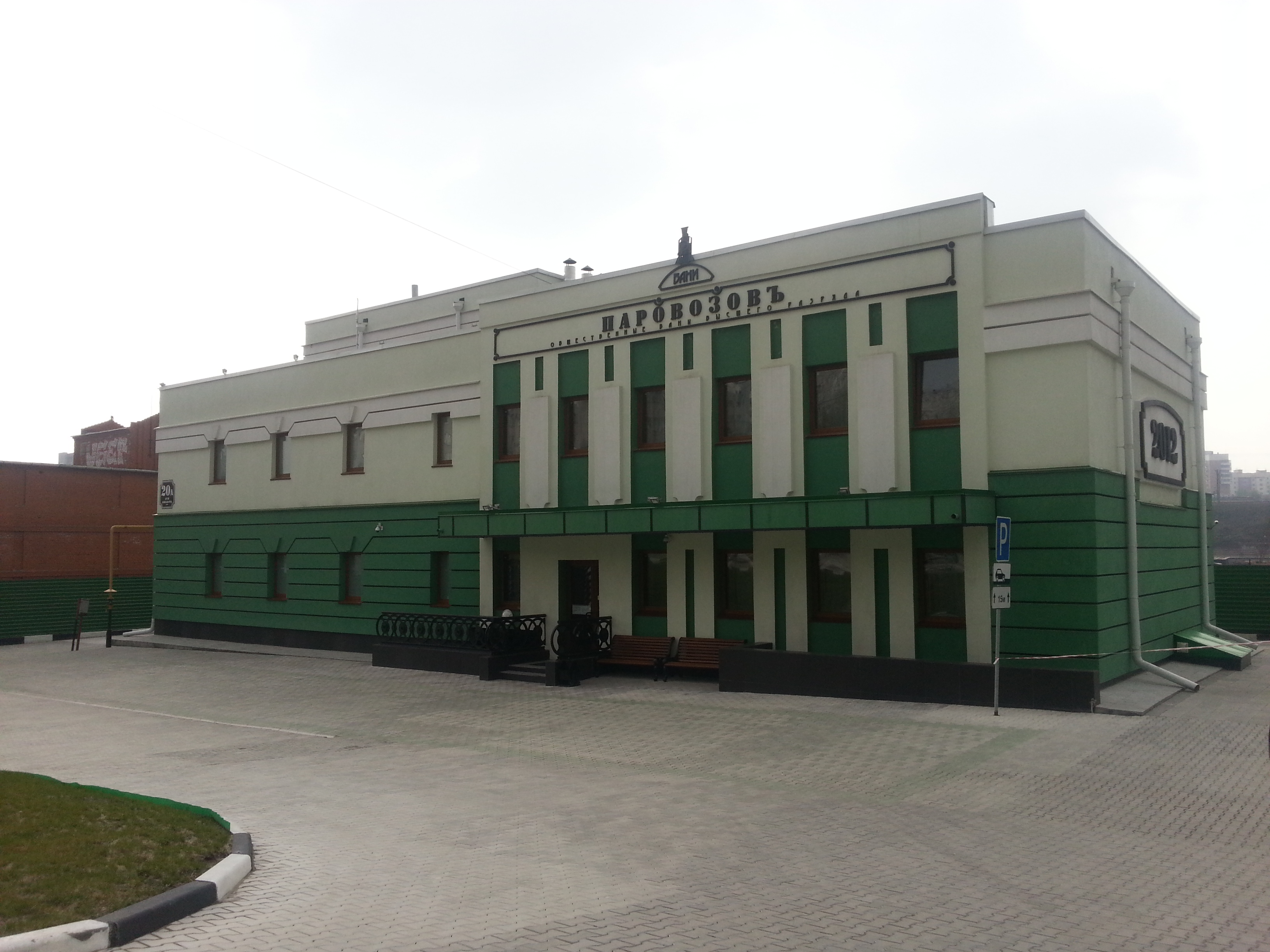
Parovozov, VIP public baths in Novosibirsk

The early banya was born in Kievan Rus'. Russian bathing customs emerged through the adaptation of practices and taboos encountered in other cultures, including Byzantium to the south, the Finns to the north, the Jews who lived among them, and Khazar tribes to the east. As in Byzantium, the banya could be a large urban institution that showed a community's respectability, yet, like the Finns and other northern peoples, it also remained associated with sorcery.

An early description of the banya comes from the 12th-century Primary Chronicle. The banya is mentioned in the Chronicle in several passages and has therefore been used to support the claim that the banya has always been inseparable from the idea of Russia and Russians. The most frequently cited passage describes the Apostle Andrew visiting Eastern Slavic territories on his way to the Greek colonies on the Black Sea. Supposedly, the belief was held that Andrew crossed through the lands from the mouth of the Dnieper River, past the hills on which Kiev would later be founded, and went as far north as the ancient city of Novgorod.

"Wondrous to relate," said he, "I saw the land of the Slavs, and while I was among them, I noticed their wooden bathhouses. They warm them to extreme heat, then undress, and after anointing themselves with tallow, they take young reeds and lash their bodies. They actually lash themselves so violently that they barely escape alive. Then they drench themselves with cold water, and thus are revived. They think nothing of doing this every day, and actually inflict such voluntary torture on themselves. They make of the act not a mere washing but a veritable torment."

Another mention of the banya is found in the story of Princess Olga's revenge for the murder of her husband, Prince Igor, by the Drevlians, an Eastern Slavic tribe, in 945 AD. The leader of the Drevlians had hopes of marrying the widow Olga and sent messengers to discuss the idea. "When the Drevlians arrived, Olga commanded that a bath should be made ready for them and said, 'Wash yourselves and come to me.' The bath-house was heated and the unsuspecting Drevlians entered and began to wash themselves. [Olga's] men closed the bath-house behind them and Olga gave orders to set it on fire from the doors, so that the Drevlians were all burned to death."

The original bathhouses were detached, low-lying wooden structures dependent on a fire lit inside to provide heat. A stove in a corner is made of large round stones that, when heated, are lifted with iron rods and placed in a wooden tub. Once the fire is built, the bather then removes the fire and flushes out the smoke before beginning the bath. Hence the soot and the term "black bathhouses" (chernaya banya).

The Portuguese António Nunes Ribeiro Sanches, court physician in Russia, acquainted western physicians with the effects of banya through his 1779 De Cura Variolarum Vaporarii Ope apud Russos.

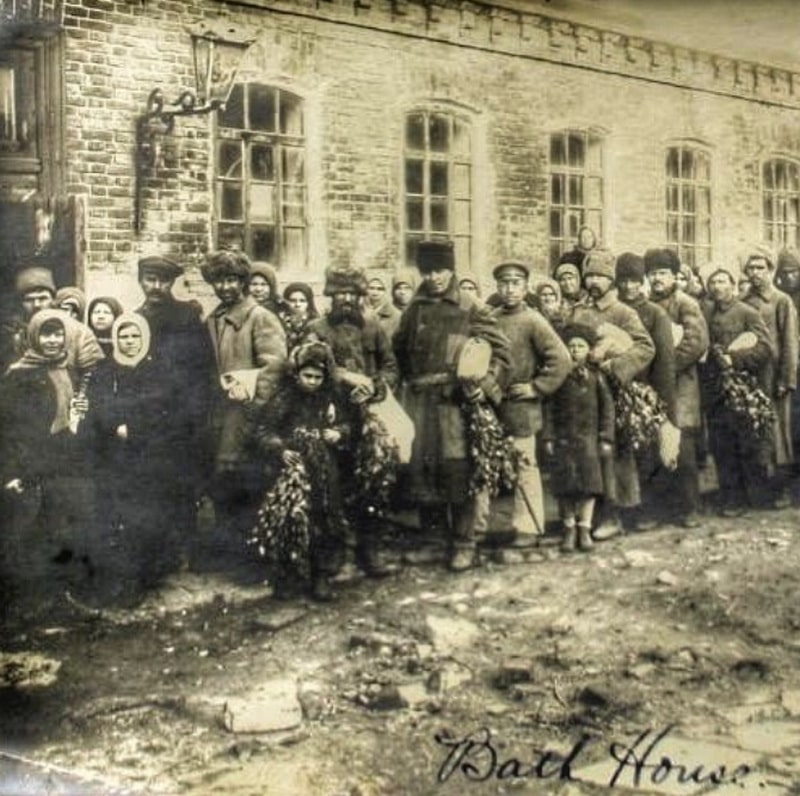
Queue in the bath

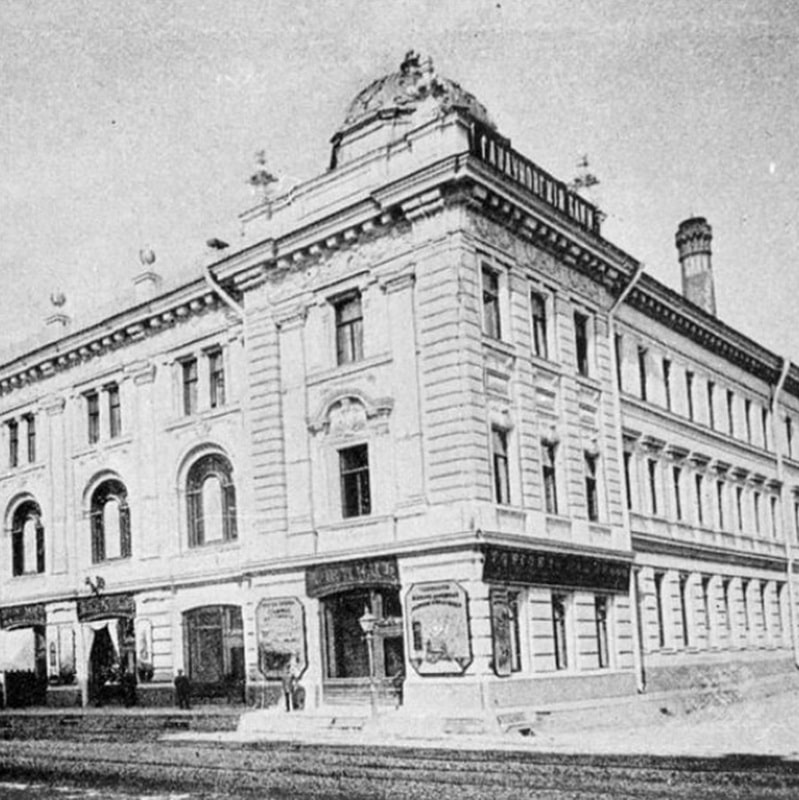
Sanduny bath

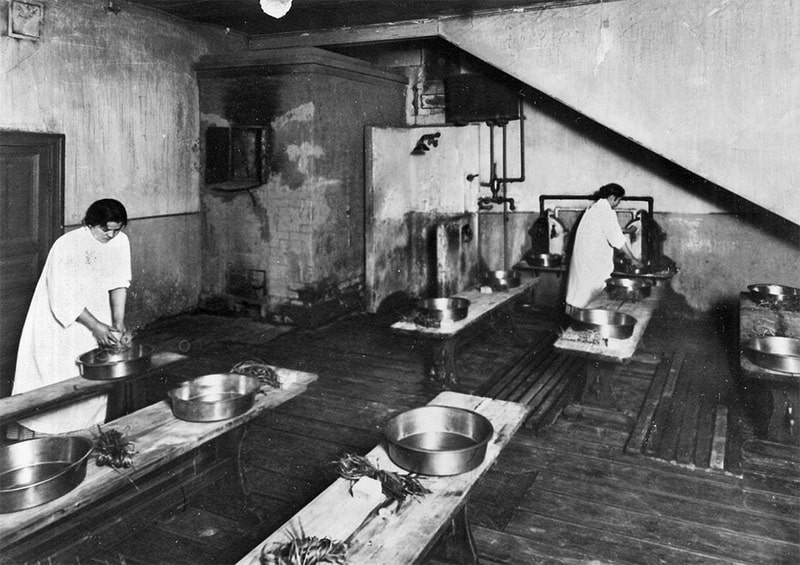
Bathhouse of the Women's Institute of 1911

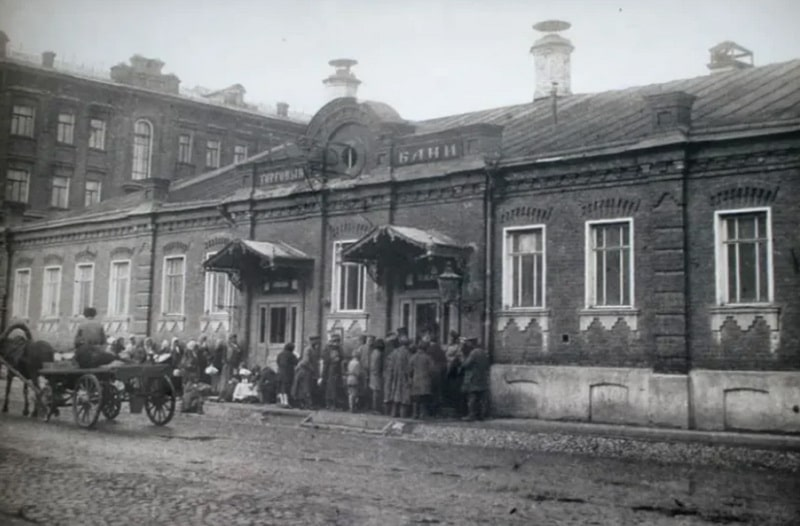
Seleznevskie bath

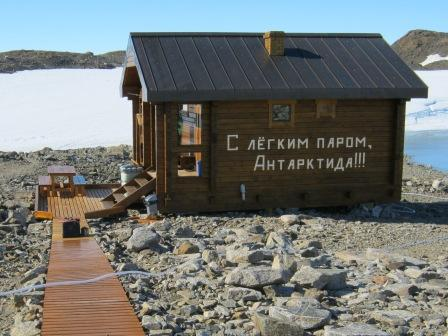
White laminated timber bathhouse, built in Antarctica in 2007; it says "С лёгким паром, Антарктида!" (lit. 'Enjoy your steam, Antarctica!!!')

== Significance in Russian culture ==
Since ancient times, the banya has been considered an important bonding place in Russian culture. Throughout Russian history, the banya was used by all social classes within Russian society, including peasants and nobles. Communal baths were very common in villages and towns. It is also currently used as a place where Russian businesspeople and politicians meet.

Russians would visit the banya once a week, typically on Saturdays. However, in larger cities, the tradition has declined due to more people living in non-communal apartments, and so the banya is used purely for relaxation. In the country, people often use a private or public banya.

== Construction ==
Banya buildings can be quite large with a number of different bathing areas or simple wooden cabins like the traditional Finnish cottage saunas. Russian banyas usually have three rooms: a steam room, a washing room and an entrance room. The entrance room, called a predbannik (предбанник) or pre-bath, has pegs to hang clothing upon and benches to rest on. The washing room has a hot water tap, which uses water heated by the steam room stove and a vessel or tap for cold water to mix water of a comfortable temperature for washing. The heater has three compartments: a fire box that is fed from the entrance room, the rock chamber, which has a small hole to throw the water into and a water tank at the top. The top of the water tank is usually closed to prevent vapour from infiltrating the banya. Water from a bucket is poured over the heated rocks in the stove. There are wooden benches across the room. People enter the steam room when the stove is hot, but before water is poured on the rocks. Getting a good sweat is thought to protect and condition the skin from the steam.

=== Black banyas and white banyas ===
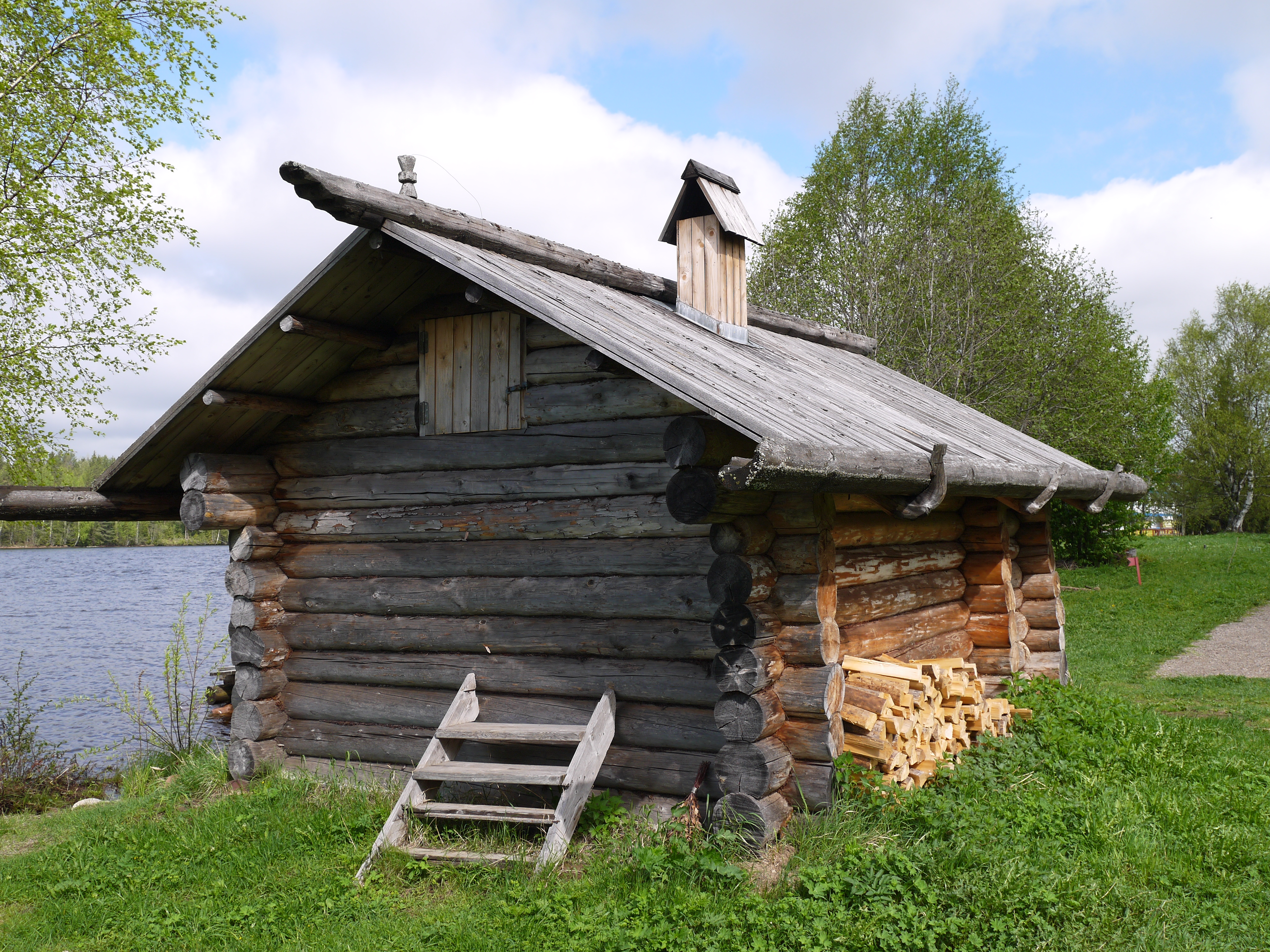
Traditional Northern Russia banya in Mandrogy open air museum

In a "black banya" (or, more precisely, "black-way", по-чёрному, po-chyornomu), the smoke escapes through a hole in the ceiling, while in "white banyas" ("white-way", по-белому, po-belomu) there are exhaust pipes to vent the smoke. In the former, the escaping smoke darkens the banya's interior wood. Both styles are characterized by boulder stones, clay balls and large cauldrons for the hot water as well as stone stoves with a tank to heat the water. The firewood is usually birch. A black banya is more rudimentary than a white banya.

=== Pokhodnaya or hiking banyas ===
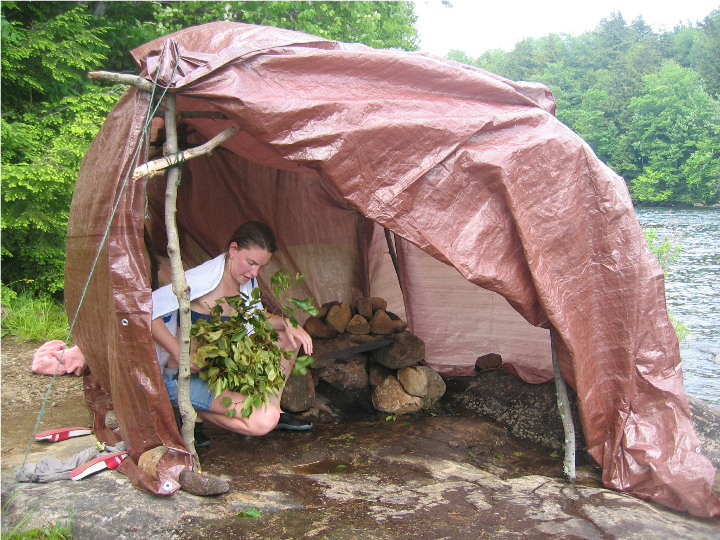
A hiking banya

The pokhodnaya banya (походная баня) or "hiking banya", is popular among the Russian military, mountaineers and people who travel for extended periods in harsh environments. It consists of a stone oven set up in a small makeshift tent. Hiking banyas are usually made near a lakeshore or riverbank where many big, round stones are available to build the banya's oven and there is plenty of cool water available for bathing. Large stones are made into a dome-shaped circular oven, one to four meters in diameter and a half to one meter in height so that there is space left on the inside to make a large fire. Firewood is burned for several hours in this improvised stove until the stones on the surface of the pile become so hot that water poured on them turns into steam. Around the pile, a space is tarped to form a small tent and the banya is ready when it becomes very hot inside and there is a lot of steam. Fresh veniks (see "Bathing ritual" below) can be cut from nearby birch or oak trees and bathers can take turns cooling off in the ice-cold mountain water.

== Bathing ritual ==
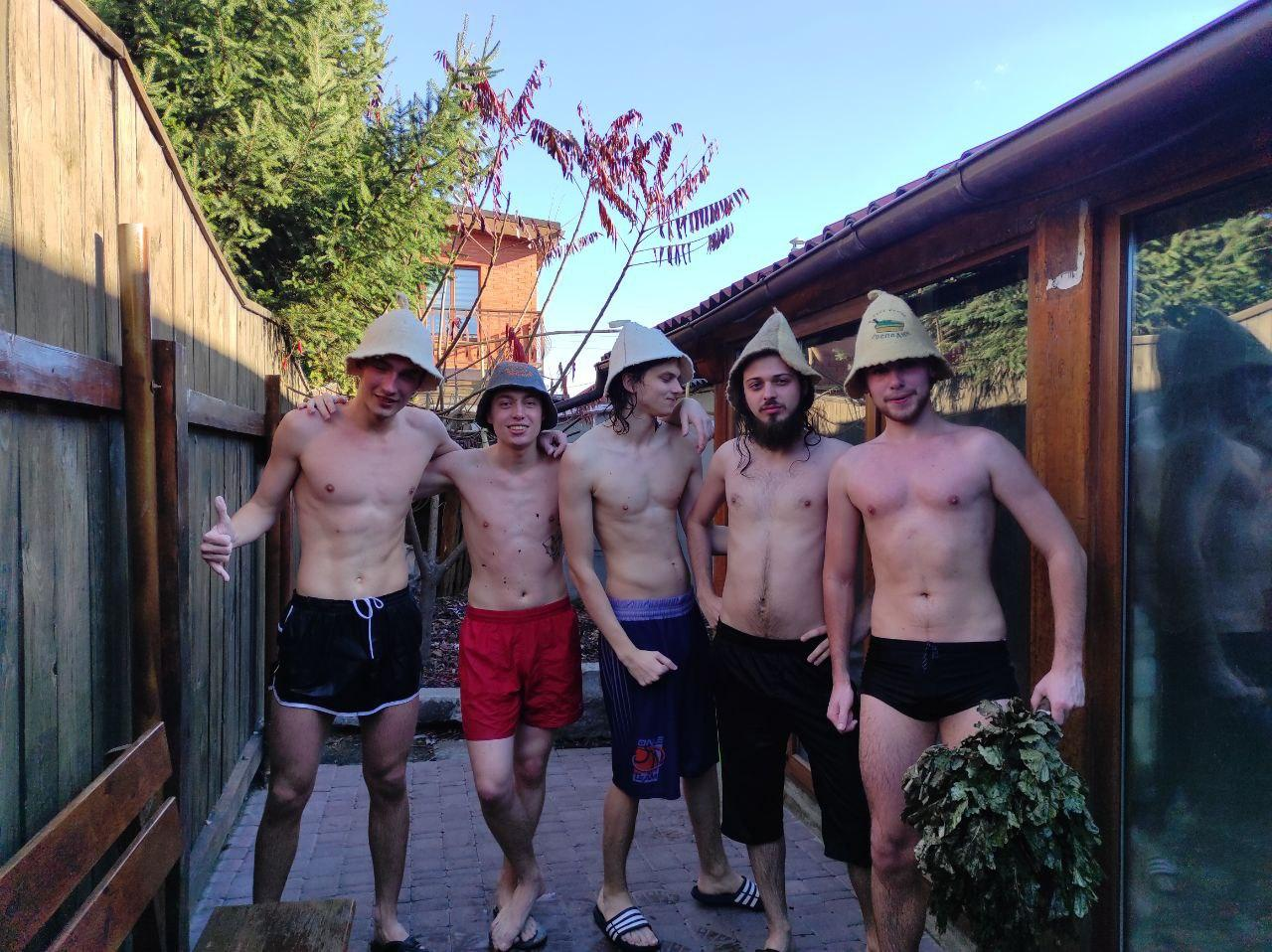
Ukrainian banschiki (банщики, lit. 'banya bathers') in 2021, wearing banya hats

Banya temperatures often will exceed 93 degrees Celsius (199 °F), and felt or wool hats are typically worn to protect the head from this intense heat and hair from heating to a point that might cause burns on contact. It is common to sit on a small mat brought into the banya to protect bare skin from the hot wood and nails of the interior benches, and for hygienic reasons. In Russia, special felt hats are commonly sold in sets with felt mitts, along with extracts for inclusion into the steam water. Use of homemade herb extracts and beer is common. Dried wormwood may be hung over walls as well. Bunches of dried branches and leaves from white birch, oak or eucalyptus (called banny venik, банный веник, "banya besom") are commonly used for massage and to facilitate heat transfer from hot air to body. The dried branches are moistened with very hot water before use. Sometimes in summer, fresh branches are used instead. Sometimes instead of drying the venik, it is frozen in the summer when it has fresh leaves and then thawed before use. In the central European Jewish baths long brushes made of raffia, known as Schmeis, were used in place of birch twigs.

After the first sweat is induced, it is customary to cool off in the breeze outdoors or splash around in cold water in a lake or river. In the winter, people may roll in the snow with no clothes on or dip in lakes where holes have been cut into the ice. Then the banya is re-entered and small amounts of water are splashed on the rocks. If too much water is used at once, the steam will be cool with a clammy feel. A small amount of water on sufficiently hot rocks will evaporate quickly, producing a steam consisting of small vapor particles. Waving the venik causes convective heat. The second sweat is commonly the first time venik is used, but some people wait until the third session.

After each sweat, cooling off is repeated and patrons use the break to drink beer, tea, or other beverages, play games or relax in good company in an antechamber to the steam room. Banyas might have a bar for people to have drinks and sometimes light meals afterwards.

== Banyas and Eastern Slavic mythology ==
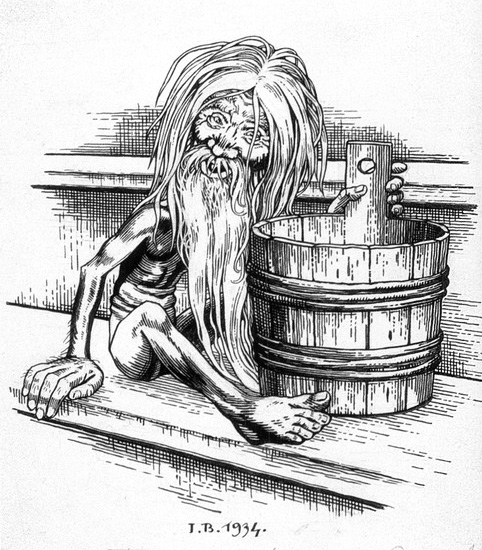
Bannik the Slavic bathhouse spirit

In Slavic mythology, specifically East Slavic mythology every banya is inhabited by the Slavic bathhouse spirit Bannik. He is described as a wizened little man with wild white hair and a long, straggly beard, long nails and hairy hands. He lives behind the stove and his temperament is supposed to be very capricious. Because of the dimmed light in the banya, he was sometimes considered even to be malicious. It was said that by anger he could throw boiling water or even burn down the banya. He likes spying on bathers, particularly undressed women. He has the ability to predict the future. One may consult him by standing with one's back exposed in the half-open door of the bath. If the future predicts good, he strokes the back lovingly, by bad prospects he grabs the back with his claws.

== In popular culture ==
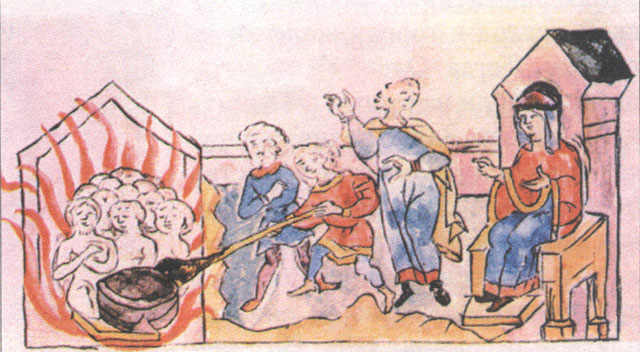
A banya depicted in the 15th-century Radziwiłł Chronicle.

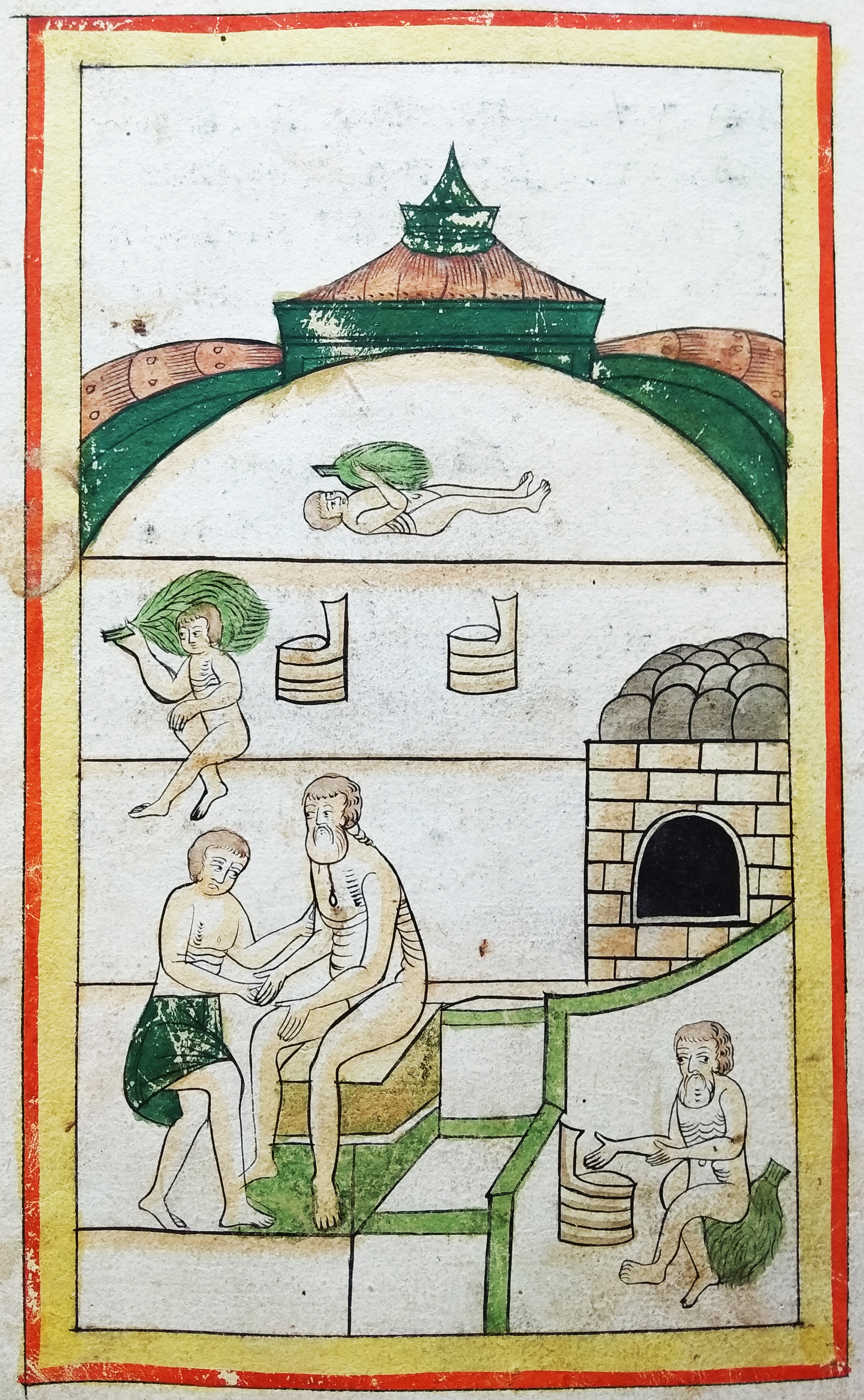
18th century Russian depiction of a banya.

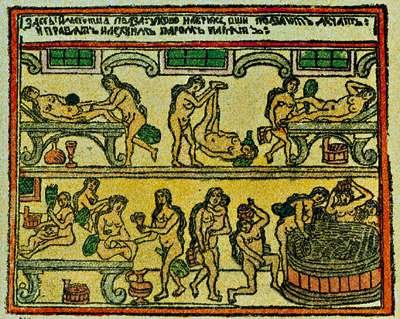
19th century Russian depiction of a banya.

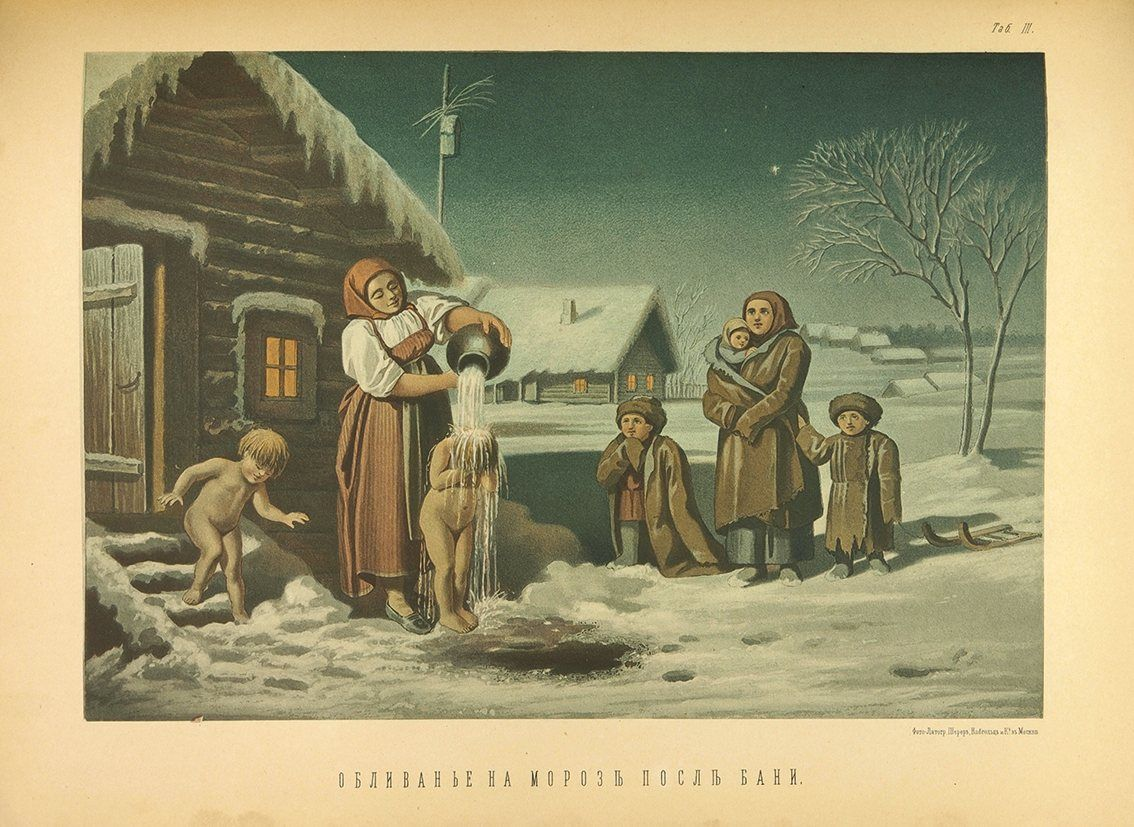
1884 art of Water Being Poured in the Cold After the Banya, by Egor Pokrovsky

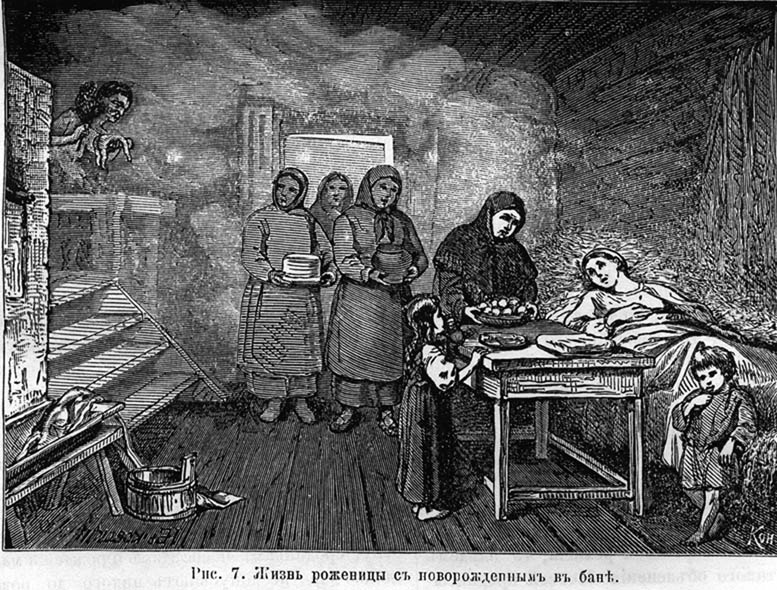
19th century illustration of a woman in labor at a banya

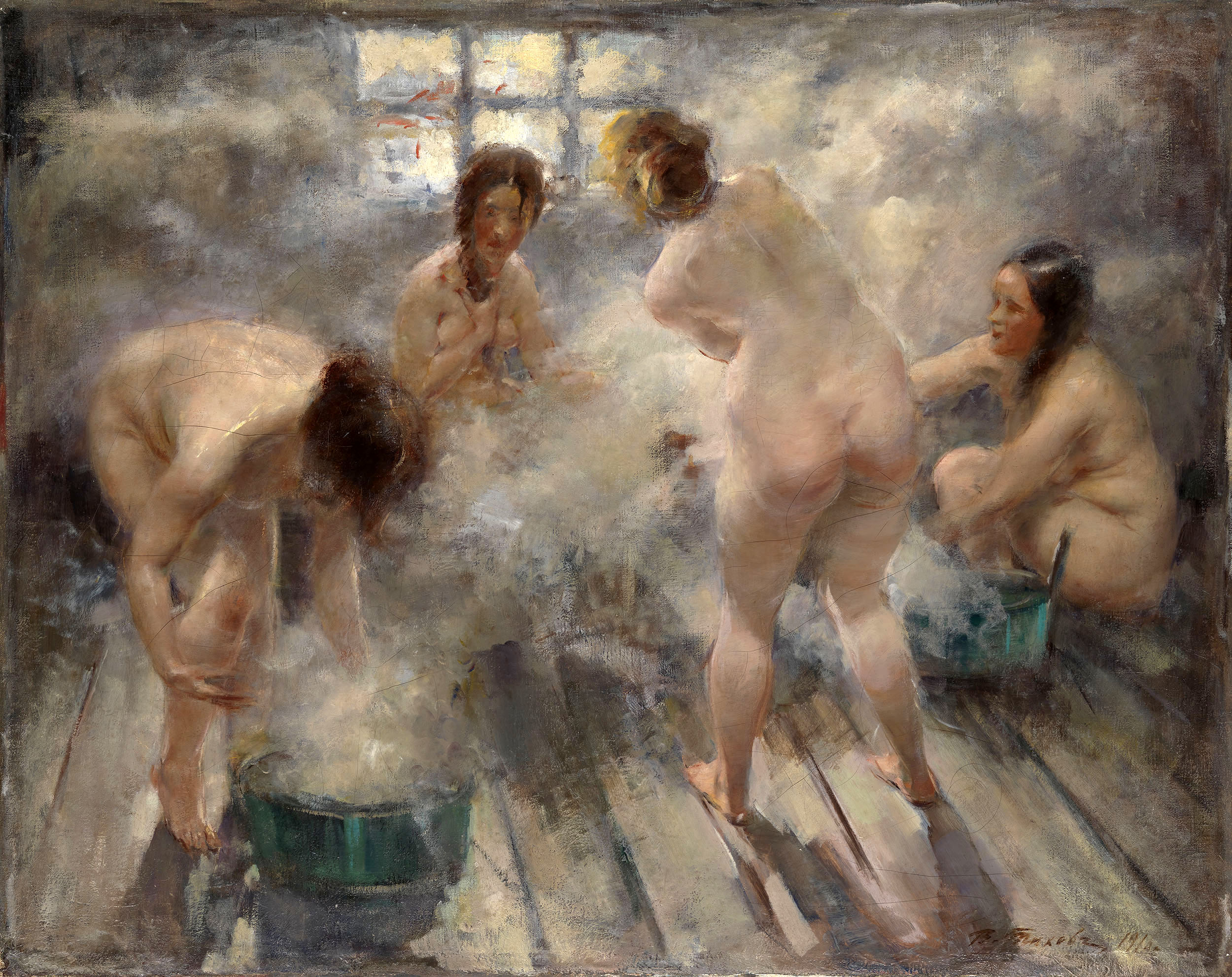
In a Russian Banya by Vitaly Tikhov, 1916

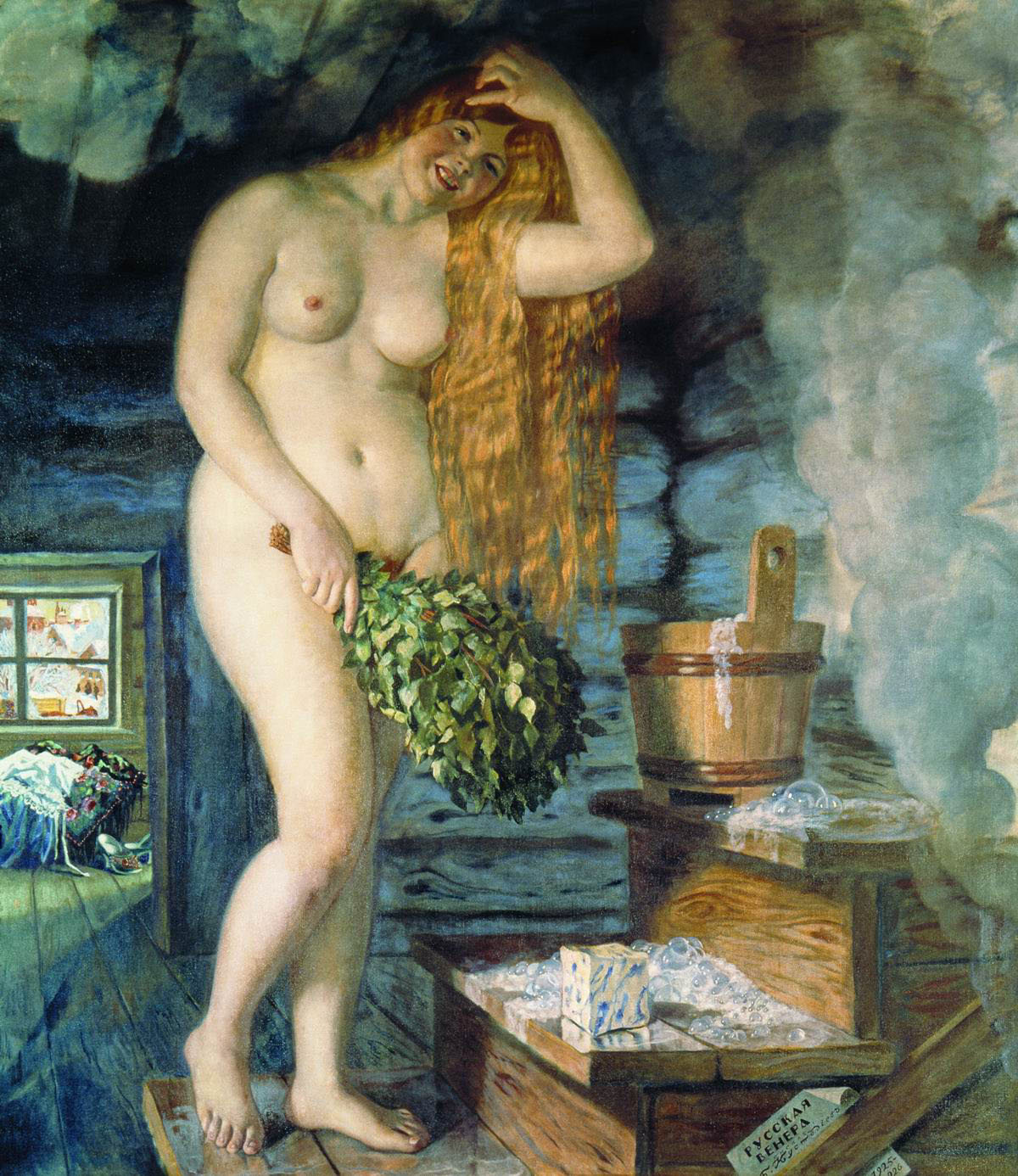
1926 Russian Venus by Boris Kustodiev, featuring a birch besom

The tradition of going to a banya on Novy God is a plot point in 1976 Russian film The Irony of Fate. As of 2014, this film continues to be watched globally by the Russian-speaking diaspora on New Year's Eve.

== See also ==
- Public bathing
- Destination spa
- Hot tub
- Steam shower
- Bannik
- Victorian Turkish baths

== Sources ==
- "Баня" . Brockhaus and Efron Encyclopedic Dictionary (in Russian). 1906.
- Kustanovich, Konstantin (2007). "Bania". In Smorodinskaya, Tatiana; Evans-Romaine, Karen; Goscilo, Helena (eds.). Encyclopedia of Contemporary Russian Culture. Routledge. p. 65. ISBN 978-0-415-32094-8.
- Pollock, Ethan (2019). Without the Banya We Would Perish: A History of the Russian Bathhouse. New York, NY, United States of America: Oxford University Press. ISBN 978-0-19-539548-8.
