= Luís da Cunha =

Portuguese diplomat (1662–1749)

His Excellency Luís da Cunha KC FC
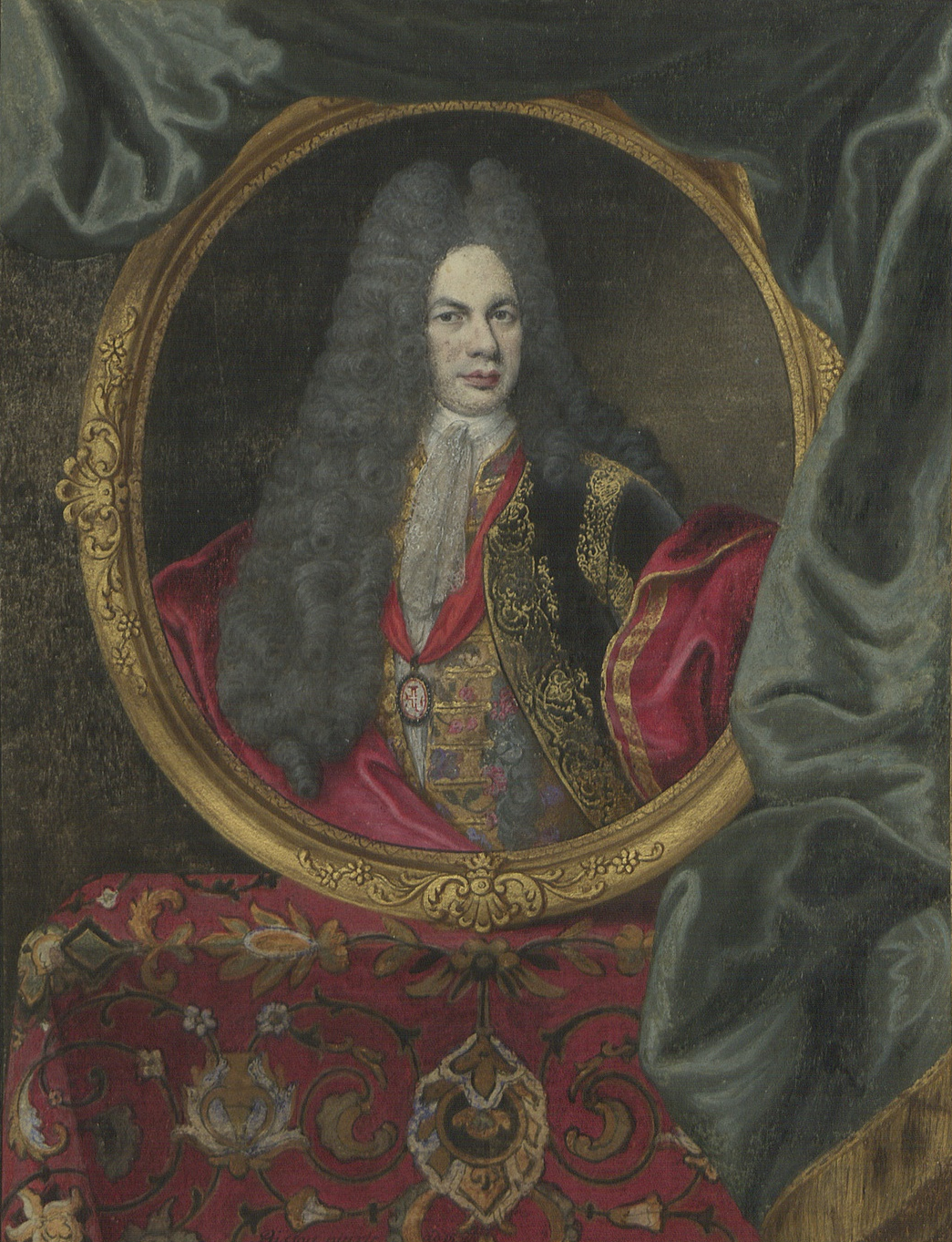
- Portrait in Memórias da Paz de Utrecht, 1715

Personal details
- Born: 23 January 1662 Lisbon, Portugal
- Died: 9 October 1749 (aged 87) Paris, France
- Education: University of Coimbra
- Occupation: Politician
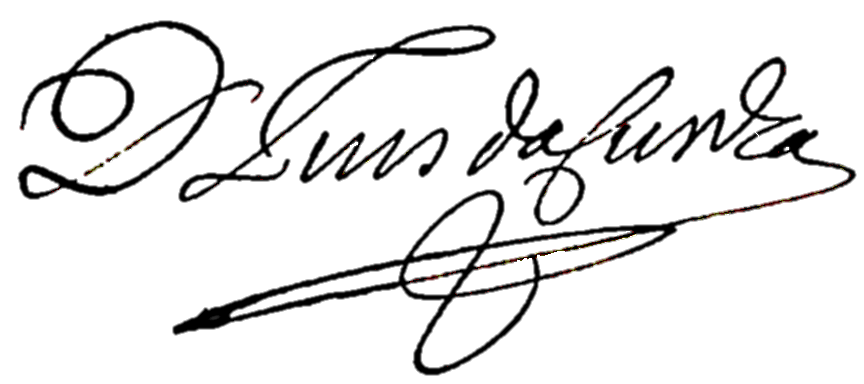
- Signature

D. Luís da Cunha (pronounced [luˈiʒ ðɐ ˈkuɲɐ]; 25 January 1662 – 9 October 1749) was a Portuguese diplomat who served under King John V of Portugal as part of His Most Faithful Majesty's Council. He was also Judge of the Royal Household, Envoy Extraordinary of Portuguese Cortes to London, Madrid and Paris, and Minister Plenipotentiary to the Congress of Utrecht, as well as part of the Portuguese Royal Academy of History.

D. Luis da Cunha was considered an estrangeirado, a Portuguese that has been influenced greatly by foreign ideas. He was a critic of the Inquisition and the persecution of New Christians.

== Early life ==
D. Luís da Cunha was born on 23 January 1662, in Lisbon, to D. António Álvares da Cunha, Lord of Tábua, head of the House of Cunha and a member of the Forty Conspirators, and Maria Manuel de Vilhena, of the family of the Counts of Vila Flor.

During his childhood, he lived in the Palace of the Counts of Cunha, in the Bairro Alto neighborhood, which was the headquarters of the Academia dos Generosos, founded by his father, where intellectual and influential people met.

He studied law at the University of Coimbra, after which he was appointed as Judge to the Relation of Porto, and later to Royal Household the Lisbon.

== Career ==
In 1696, he was appointed envoy extraordinary to London, where he participated in important negotiations related to the Portuguese intervention in the War of the Spanish Succession, the most complex political event of the time. In 1712, along with the Count of Tarouca, he represented Portuguese interests in the Congress of Utrecht. By April 1712, da Cunha had left his post.

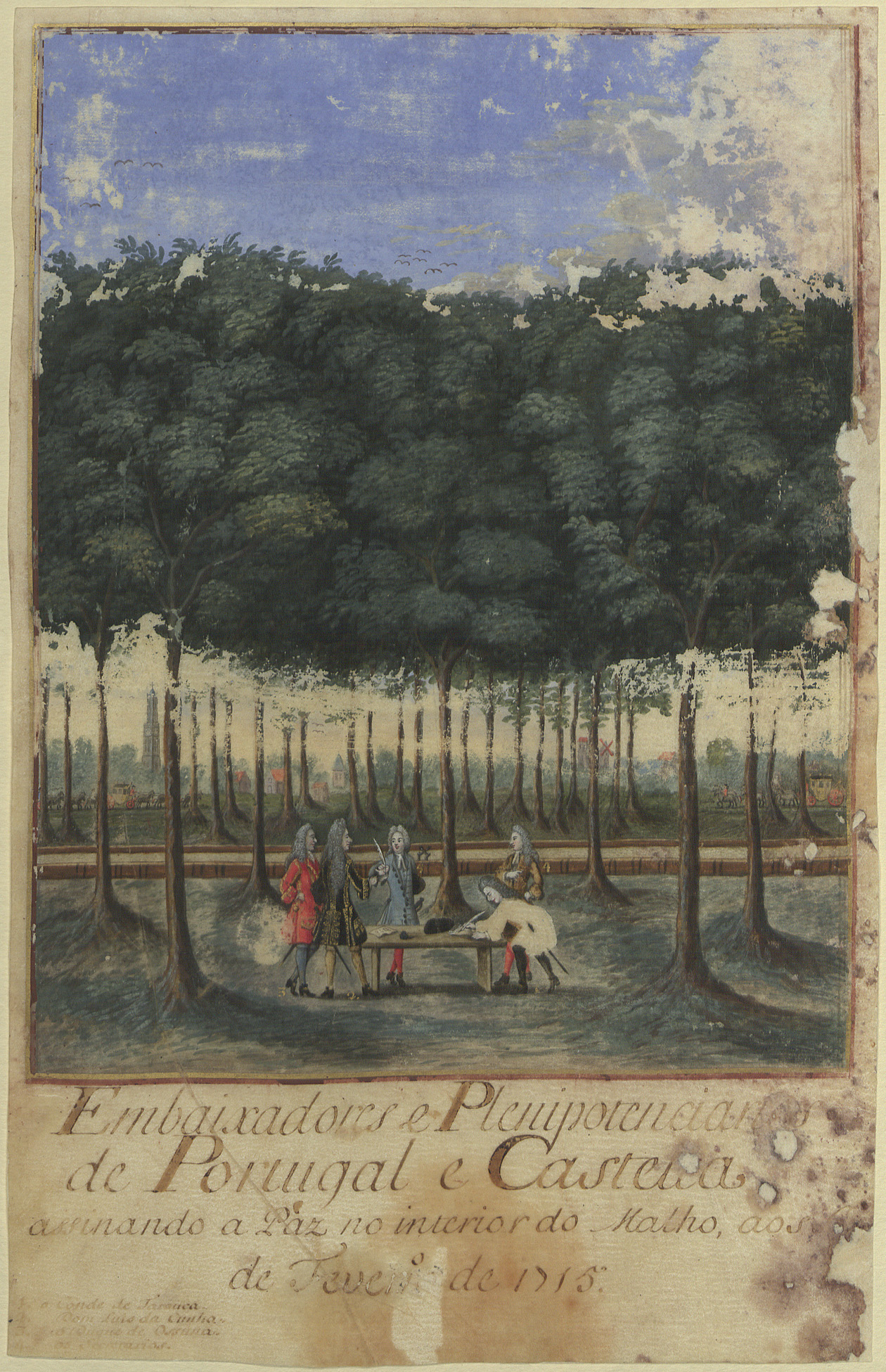
Signature of the Treaty of Utrecht between Portugal and Spain on 6 February 1715.

After the signing of the Treaty of Utrecht, 1715, he returned to London as envoy extraordinary, by request of the newly crowned King George I of Great Britain. By 1719, da Cunha had left his post once again.

Then he was sent to Madrid, then ruled by Giulio Alberoni, with whom he had several disputes.

Subsequently, he was appointed Minister Plenipotentiary to the Congress of Cambray, which ended up not taking place. Cunha remained in Paris, where he was forced to retire due to a disagreement with Ambassador Livry, envoy of France to Lisbon. Cunha went to Brussels, where he reached an agreement with the Marquis of Fenelon, French minister to The Hague, and returned to Paris, where he remained as envoy extraordinary of Portugal to the French court, until his death.

== Ideas ==
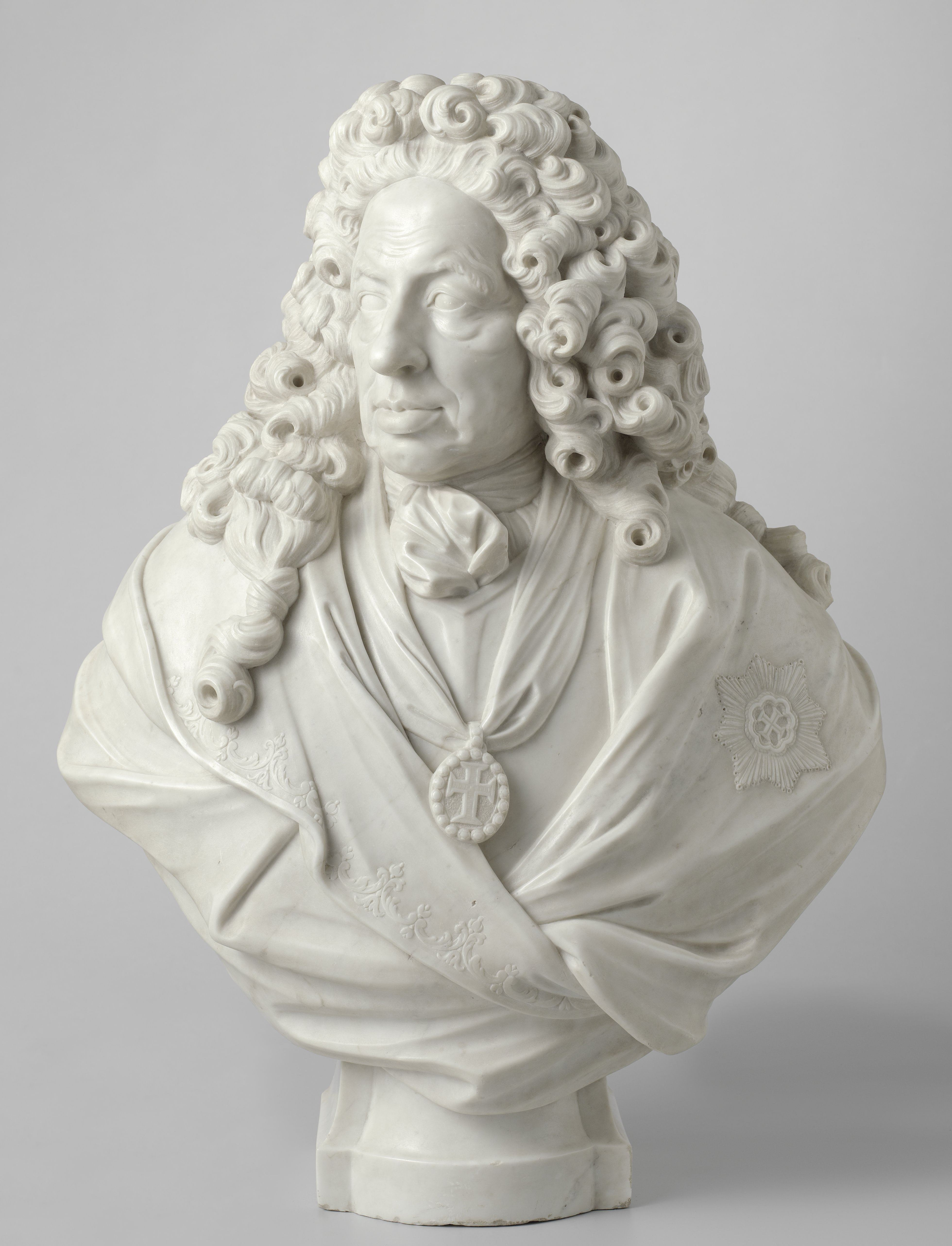
Marble bust by Jan Baptist Xavery, 1737

D. Luís da Cunha had early ideas of pluricontinentalism, proposing the idea of moving the capital of the Portuguese monarchy from metropolitan Portugal to Brazil. By establishing himself in the "immense continent of Brazil", the King of Portugal would take the title of "Emperor of the Occident".

This idea was already presented by Father António Vieira, during the emergency period of the Portuguese Restoration War, but was reiterated by D. Luís da Cunha when no imminent threat hung over Portuguese sovereignty.

The idea was proposed as a means of affirmation and advancement of the Kingdom of Portugal, while at the same time guaranteeing its security from European powers.

== Distinctions ==
- (Portugal) Knight Commander of the Order of Christ
