= Luís António Verney =

Luís António Verney CavC
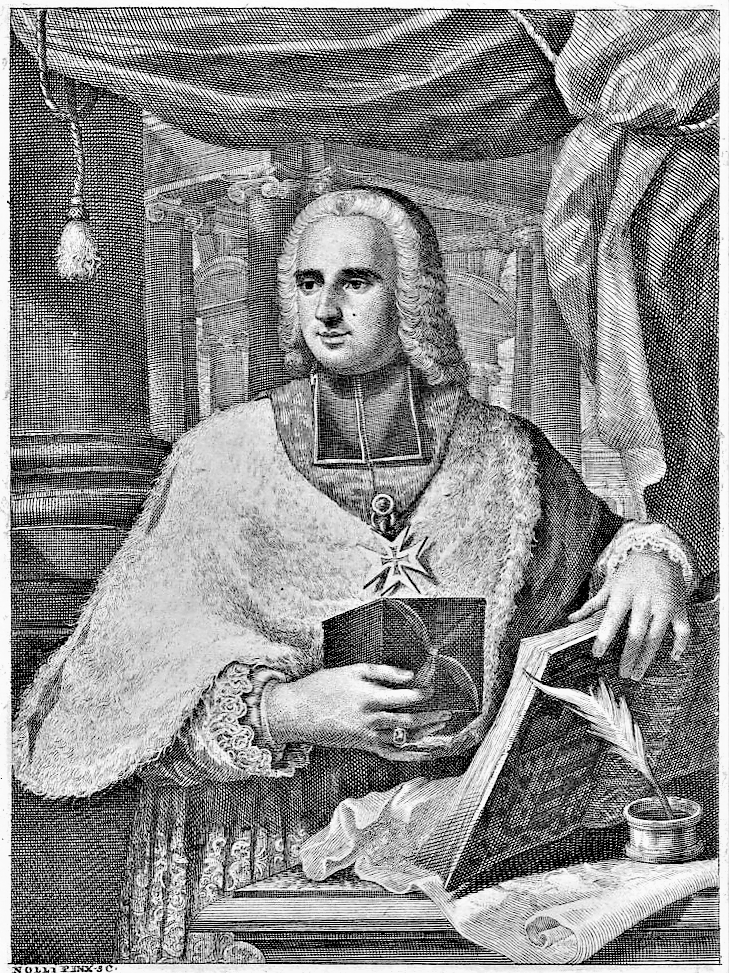
- Portrait of Verney, 1791
- Born: 23 July 1713; Lisbon, Portugal
- Died: 23 March 1792 (aged 78); Rome, Papal States
- Occupation: Clergyman

Luís António Verney (Note: Sometimes rendered as "Vernei".) (23 July 1713 – 23 March 1792) was a Portuguese philosopher, theologian, and pedagogue. An estrangeirado, Verney is sometimes called the most important figure of the Portuguese Enlightenment.

Most notably, Verney advocated a plan to completely reform the educational system in Portugal, in radical opposition to the methods employed at the time by the Jesuits, who had long had a near-monopoly on teaching in the country; his controversial manifesto, Verdadeiro Método de Estudar (first published anonymously in 1746), would later serve as the basis for many of the educational reforms instituted under the Marquis of Pombal.

== Biography ==
Luís António Verney was born in Lisbon in 1713, the son of Denys Verney (1650 – c. 1734), from Saint-Clément-les-Places in Lyon, France, and Maria da Conceição Arnaut, from the parish of Santa Eufémia in the town of Penela, Coimbra. The family of wealthy merchants was established in Rua Nova do Almada, where they owned a drugstore. One of 10 siblings (4 boys and 6 girls — through one of which Verney was to be João Frederico Ludovice's brother-in-law), Luís António was baptized on 6 August of that year, in the Church of Saint Julian. He was first tutored by the family's chaplain, Fr. Manuel de Aguiar Paixão, at the age of six, in his first studies of Latin Grammar, Spanish, French, and Italian.

He studied in the Jesuit College of Saint Antony the Abbot, probably between 1720 and 1727, and from then till 1729, Philosophy with the Oratorians, at the Convent of the Holy Spirit of the Quarry (Espírito Santo da Pedreira). In April 1729, Luís António Verney interrupted his studies to enlist as a volunteer in a military expedition in Portuguese India; for unknown reasons, however, he seems to have had a change of heart — by November of that year, he enrolled in the Jesuit-run University of Évora, from which he concluded his studies in Philosophy and Theology, achieving the degree of Artium Magister in 1736.

Afterwards, Verney travelled to Rome to earn a doctorate in Theology and Law in the Sapienza University of Rome. There, he became a member of the Academy of the Arcadians, and corresponded with important figures of the Italian Enlightenment, such as leading encyclopedist Ludovico Antonio Muratori, and Antonio Genovesi. In 1741, he was appointed Archdeacon of the Metropolitan Archdiocese of Évora.

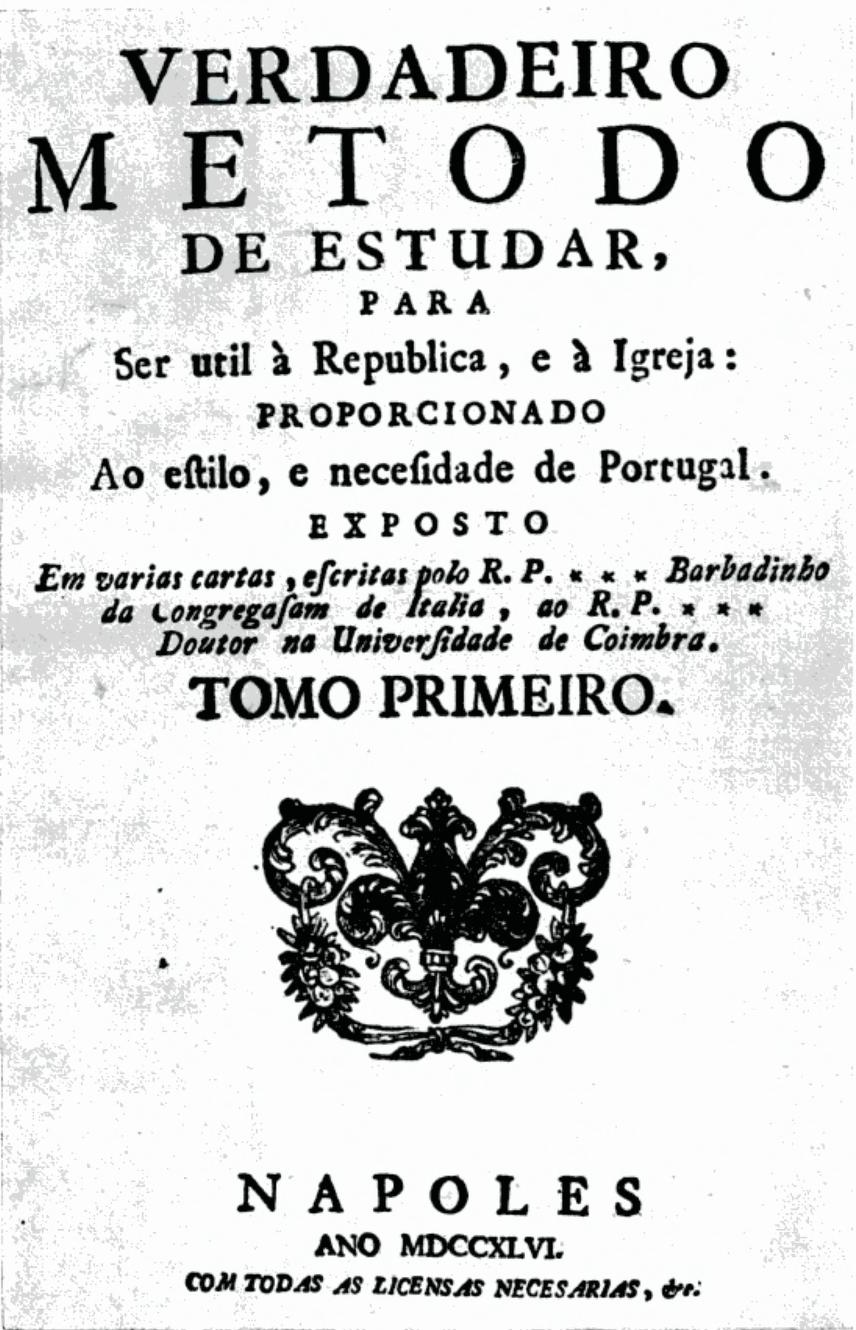
Title page of the only known copy of the first edition of Verdadeiro Método de Estudar (Naples, 1746), National Library of Naples

It was around this time that Verney conceived his plan to reform the educational system in Portugal, to bring it closer to the winds of cultural progress that permeated the spirits of progressive Europe. His Verdadeiro Método de Estudar, setting out in summary form his harsh criticism of the existing system and his proposals for changing it, was initially published anonymously in 1746: it soon became the focus of much controversy, which made Verney lose much needed influence at the court of King John V. In Verdadeiro Método de Estudar, Verney argued that grammar should be taught in Portuguese, not Latin, and staunchly defended experimental methods, as opposed to a system of argumentation based on authority, calling into question the influence of the Society of Jesus, who held a near-monopoly of higher education in the country; Verney also approached (without necessarily adopting) some of the principles of the Jansenists and Gallicans in relation to the methods used in theological studies. The book prompted a furious polemic: between its first publication and 1757, over forty books were written in response to Verney's manifesto.

Verney's standing with the political elites grew stronger with the rise of the chief minister of King Joseph I, the Marquis of Pombal, he himself an estrangeirado. Following the national suppression of the Society of Jesus in 1759, Pombal's subsequent reforms saw many of Verney's ideas implemented into the Portuguese educational system. Verney himself was appointed, in April 1768, secretary of the Portuguese Legation in Rome; however, Verney's involvement in political issues resulted in his fall from grace and dismissal in 1771. He lived in exhile in San Miniato until his rehabilitation following the death of King Joseph I and the accession of Queen Maria I in 1777. In 1780, he became a correspondent of the Lisbon Academy of Sciences in Rome and, in 1790, was named an honorary member of the Board of Conscience and Orders (Mesa da Consciência e Ordens).

Old and sick, Luís António Verney died in Rome in March 1792, after spending eight days in a coma. He was already blind and ailing on 18 August 1791, when he dictated his will.

== Works ==
- De recuperata sanitate Joannes Regis, etc. Oratio. (Rome, 1745)
- Verdadeiro Método de Estudar, Para Ser Útil à República, e à Igreja (Naples, 1746)
- De conjungenda Philosophia cum Theologia. Oratio. (Rome, 1747)
- De Ortographia Latina liber singularis (Rome, 1747; Coimbra, 1818)
- Apparatus ad Philosophiam et Theologiam ad usum lusitanorum adolescentium, liber sex (Rome, 1751)
- De Re Logica ad usum lusitanorum adolescentium, libri quinque (Rome, 1751)
- Serenissimo Principi Ludovico Burgundia Duci, Gallorum Delphini filio, Carmen genethliacum (Rome, 1752)
- De Re Metaphysica ad usum lusitanorum adolescentium, libri quatuor (Rome, 1753)
- Grammatica Latina, tractada por um methodo novo, claro e facil (Barcelona, 1758)
- Cartas de Luis Antonio Verney e Antonio Pereira de Figueiredo aos padres da Congregação do Oratorio de Goa (New Goa, 1858)
- Synopsis primi tentaminis pro litteratura scientiisque instaurandis apud Lusitanos, etc. (Lisbon and Paris, 1762)
- De Re Physica (Rome, 1769)
