= Jacob de Castro Sarmento =

Portuguese physician (1690–1762)

- Born: 6 May 1690; Bragança, Kingdom of Portugal
- Died: 14 September 1762 (aged 69–70); London, United Kingdom
- Occupations: Physician, naturalist, poet

Jacob Henriques de Castro Sarmento (6 May 1690 in Bragança, Portugal – 14 September 1762 in London) was a Portuguese estrangeirado, physician, naturalist, poet and deist.

== Life ==
At the age of seventeen he entered the University of Évora to study philosophy, and later studied medicine at Coimbra, receiving his baccalaureate in 1717. In order to escape the persecutions of the Portuguese Inquisition, Henrique — so-called as a marrano, a Christian to the outside world, but privately a practicing Jew, — went into voluntary exile in London in 1720. There he continued his studies in medicine, physics, and chemistry, and passed his examinations in the theory and practice of medicine. He became a member of the Royal College of Physicians and was elected a fellow of the Royal Society of London in 1730, in recognition of his having introduced a new medicine for curing fevers. Castro Sarmento married Elizabeth, a non-Jew and converted to Anglicanism, although he was not baptized.

== Career ==
Learning about quinine in London, Castro Sarmento developed a medicine known as Água de Inglaterra, which became popular in Portugal where malaria was still widespread in the southern part of the country. In 1731 he elaborated a plan for a botanical garden in Coimbra. Castro Sarmento corresponded with many scholars, among others with Prof. João Mendes Sachetti Barbosa of Lisbon, who reported to him the terrible earthquake that destroyed the capital of Portugal in 1755, and with the Jesuit Buenaventura Suárez, who communicated to him his astronomical observations made in Jesuit reduction of Paraguay. He was a strong proponent of Newtonianism and made efforts to integrate it with Jewish theology. He published Theorica verdadeira das marés, conforme à philosophia do incomparavel cavalhero Isaac Newton (Treatise on the true theory of tides, according to the philosophy of the incomparable gentleman Isaac Newton), the first book in Portuguese to advocate Newton ideas (London, 1737).

== Literary Activity ==
The literary activity of Castro Sarmento began with a treatise on vaccination, Dissertatio in Novam, Tutam, ac Utilem Methodum Inoculationis seu Transplantationis Variolorum (London, 1721; German translation, Hamburg, 1722; Supplement, London, 1731; anonymously, Leyden). Other works are: Historia Medica Physico-Hist.-Mechanica, part i, London, 1731; part ii, London 1735; Syderohydrologia ó Discurso das Aguas Mineraes Espadañas ou Chalibeadas, London, 1736, identical with Da Uso, e Abuso das Minhas Agoas da Inglaterra, London, 1756; and a Portuguese translation of the treatise of the surgeon Samuel Sharp: Surgical Operations, with Plates and Descriptions of the Instruments Used (London, 1744).

In recognition of his services to medicine the University of Aberdeen awarded him a medical degree in July 1739. Castro Sarmento was also a poet and a preacher. He published Exemplar de Penitencia, Dividido en Tres Discursos Para ó dia Santo de Kipur (London, 1724); "Sermão Funebre as Memorias do . . . Haham Morenu a R. e Doutor David Neto" (London, 1728); and in Spanish, Extraordinaria Providencia Que el Gran Dios de Ysrael Uso con su Escogido Pueblo en Tiempo de su Mayor Afflicion por Medio de Mordehay y Ester Contra los Protervos Intentos del Tyrano Aman, Deducida de la Sagrada Escritura en el Sequinte Romance (London, 1728).

== Bibliography ==
- Kayserling, Meyer, Biblioteca Española-Portugueza-Judaica, p. 37
- —, in Monatsschrift, vii. 393 et seq., viii. 161 et seq.
- Landau. Geschichte der jüdischen Ärzte, p. 135 (who follows the inaccurate information of Carmoly)
- Catalogue of Anglo-Jewish Historical Exhibition, p. 49
