= António Nunes Ribeiro Sanches =

Portuguese educationist, historian, physician and translator (1699–1783)

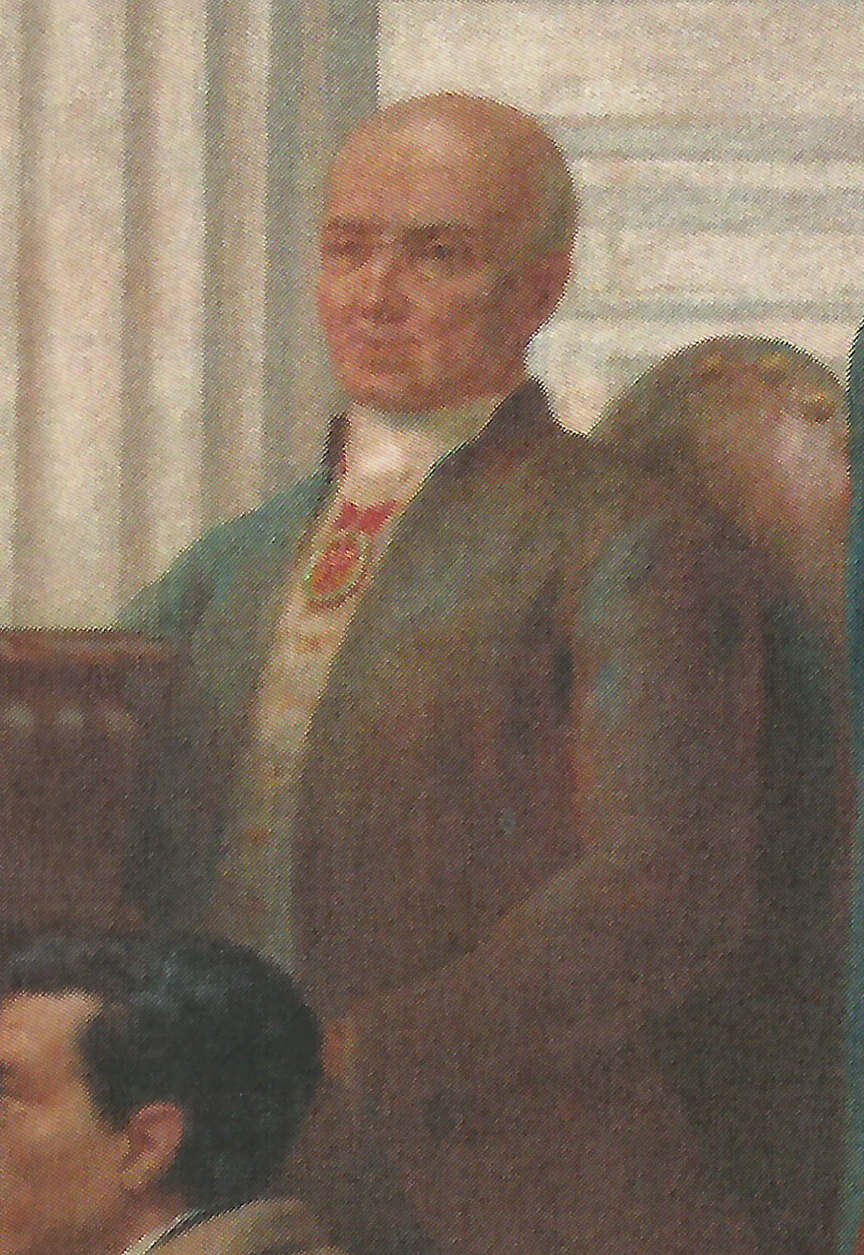
- Depiction by Veloso Salgado, 1906
- Born: António Nunes Ribeiro Sanches; 7 March 1699; Penamacor, Portugal
- Died: 14 October 1783 (aged 84); Paris
- Occupation: Physician

António Nunes Ribeiro Sanches (7 March 1699 – 14 October 1783) was a Portuguese physician, philosopher and encyclopédiste. He was a cristão novo of Jewish descent, believed to be secretly a practising Jew.

He studied at the universities of Coimbra and Salamanca. He fled Portugal after being targeted by the Inquisition as a secret practising Jew. Sanches moved then to London. He then went to Leyden University where he completed his formation under the direction of Herman Boerhaave. He subsequently would work as a physician in various European countries. He was among the three physicians recommended to Anna of Russia in 1731.

Appointed doctor of the Russian army, he distinguished himself before becoming a court physician. After more than 15 years in Russia, he left the country in 1748 after empress Elizabeth Petrowna had denounced two of his colleagues as Jews. Having had the chance, amid the daily proscriptions which he witnessed to be allowed to leave the country, he took the way to Paris in 1748 where he ended his life. After she ascended to the throne, Catherine the Great rewarded him for his services with a pension of 1000 rubles, which was punctually paid until his death. His extensive library was by the empress.

He wrote the article "Vérole" ("smallpox") in the Encyclopédie by Diderot and D'Alembert. He was the first to acquaint western physicians with the effects of Russian steam baths.

He was considered an "Estrangeirado", a Portuguese that has been influenced greatly by foreign ideas. He was a critic of the nobility, clerical privileges and slavery.

== Works ==
- 1726: Discurso Sobre as Águas de Penha Garcia.
- 1751: A Dissertation on the Venereal Disease.
- 1752: Dissertation sur le origine de la maladie vénérienne, Paris
- 1756: Tratado da Conservação da Saúde dos Povos.
- 1760: Cartas sobre a Educação da Mocidade.
- 1763: Método para Aprender e Estudar a Medicina.
- 1771: Les bains des vapeurs russe
- 1774: Examen historique sur l´apparition de la maladie vénérienne (Paris)
- 1779: Mémoire sur les Bains de Vapeur en Russie..

== Bibliography ==
- Georges Dulac, Science et politique : les réseaux du Dr António Ribeiro Sanches, Cahiers du Monde russe (ISSN 1252-6576), 2002, 43/2-3, (p. 251–274) (Read online).
- Hugh James Rose, A New General Biographical Dictionary, t. 11, Londres, B. Fellowes, 1857, (p. 443).
- José Luis Doria: Antonio Ribeiro Sanches. A Portuguese doctor in 18th century Europe. (PDF; 320 kB) Antonio Ribeiro Sanches, Vesalius, VII, 1, 27 - 35, 2001.
- Erwin Ackerknecht: Boerhaave Schüler als Medizinalpolitiker, in Erna Lesky, Adam Wandruszka (Hrsg.) Gerard van Swieten und seine Zeit, Böhlau 1973, (p. 122).
