= Steam bath =

Bath facility

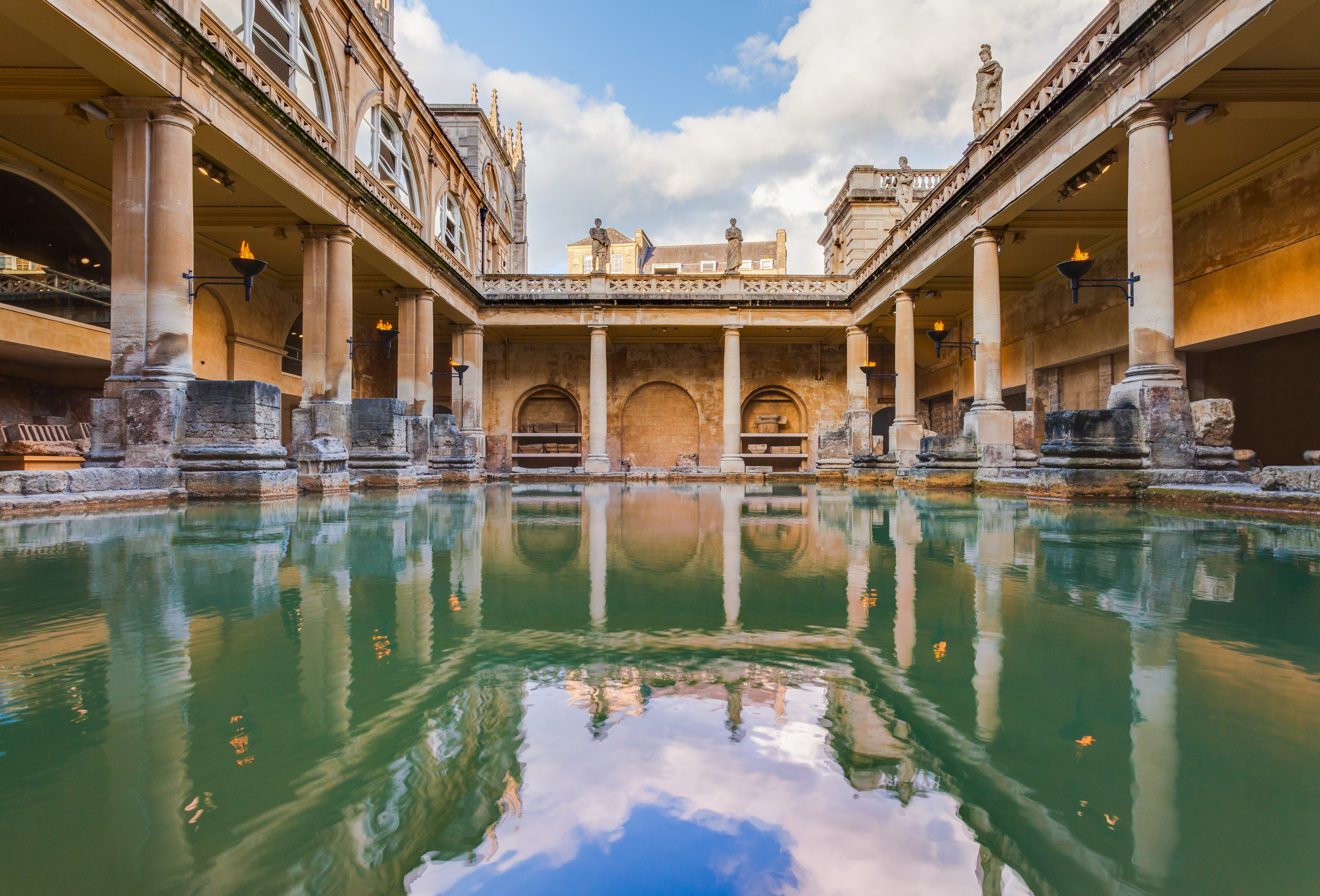
Roman steam bath located in Bath, England.

A steam bath is a steam-filled room or steam-filled cabinet designed for the purpose of relaxation and holistic treatment. Steam baths have been formally recognized since ancient Greek and Roman times, yet variations can be found throughout the Middle East, Asia, Mesoamerica, and Northern Africa. The Greeks developed early vapor baths called laconica in Sparta, while the Roman variation was referred to as thermae, among the most famous of which is located in Bath, England, and was founded in the first century AD.

Regardless of location, steam baths serve as gathering places, centers for relaxation, and places for ritualistic practice. Steam baths have historically been operated through various forms of technology, from Roman hypocaust systems to pipes designed to transport geothermal water.

== History ==
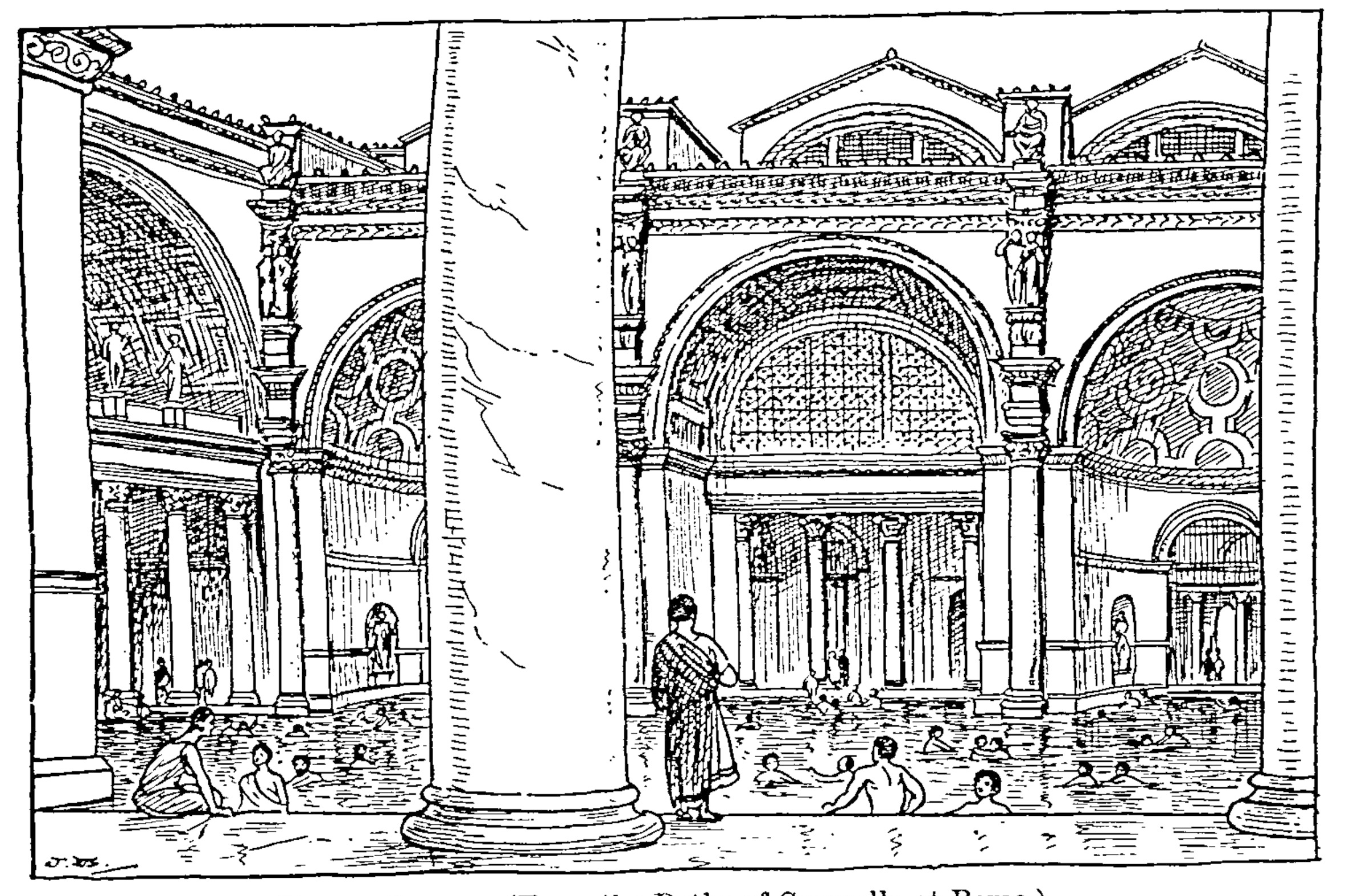
An artist's depiction of a traditional Roman thermae.

The Romans developed the first recognized steam baths, which became prevalent throughout the Roman Empire. Ancient Roman baths served many community and social functions within Roman society—many citizens used public baths (thermae) regardless of their socioeconomic status, fostering social interaction and political networking. These baths utilized advanced engineering, including aqueducts for water supply and hypocaust systems for heating, which involved creating space beneath the floor for a coal-burning furnace designed to heat the room’s ceramic-tiled walls. The steam bath was part of a ritual progression through temperature zones to facilitate therapeutic activity. Bathers would transition between heat and cold exposure in three stages: the frigidarium (cold room), tepidarium (warm room), and caldarium (hot room).

The tepidarium was another variant of the steam bath involving the production of steam by pouring water onto a bronze pan heated by coal—whereas other variants of Roman steam baths were supplied by natural hot springs from beneath the ground.

Historical parts of an ancient spa—including Roman, medieval, Georgian, and Victorian influences—were restored in Bath, England. The city’s 18th-century Georgian architecture, such as the Royal Crescent and Thermae Bath Spa, combines neoclassical design with functional spa elements, preserving its legacy as a thermal destination.

Yet another variant of the steam bath, known as the hammām, was developed in Central Asia and adopted within the Arab Empire following its popularity in Rome. It became an element of holistic care in the region, acting as a method of soothing the body, removing toxins, and promoting general wellness. Early constructions of hammāms in Turkey, Iran, and Northern Africa still exist in modern times.

== Modern steam baths ==
Today, natural steam baths often use similar systems that the Romans used. Such systems contain pipes and pumps that bring water up from beneath the surface and into the large pool areas near natural spring areas, such as at Thermae Bath Spa, where geothermal waters reach 40-49°C (114-120°F). While numerous variations—both natural and artificial—exist throughout the globe, the adoption of this technology still remains prevalent.

While they share similarities, steam baths differ from saunas. Both produce steam via water vapor, but the steam in a sauna is created by throwing water onto a hot stove housed within a wooden structure, whereas steam baths have traditionally existed as steam-producing systems housed in stone structures.

== Architectural evolution ==
The design of steam baths reflects both engineering ingenuity and cultural priorities. Roman thermae pioneered key features like hypocaust underfloor heating systems, which circulated hot air through clay pipes and hollow tiles to evenly warm floors and walls. This technology was later adapted by Islamic architects in hammams, as well as by Byzantine variants, which preserved the Roman tripartite structure (frigidarium, tepidarium, caldarium) but added mosaic floors and paintings to cover the surrounding walls.

In Alaska, steam baths were constructed out of cut logs or even plywood, which were reminiscent of the Russian banya. These Alaskan baths were likewise used for a variety of cultural and hygienic practices and were capable of reaching temperatures of up to 255°F (123°C). Their engineering involved low ceilings and a pit in the structure's center designed for steam production.

== Other cultural significance ==
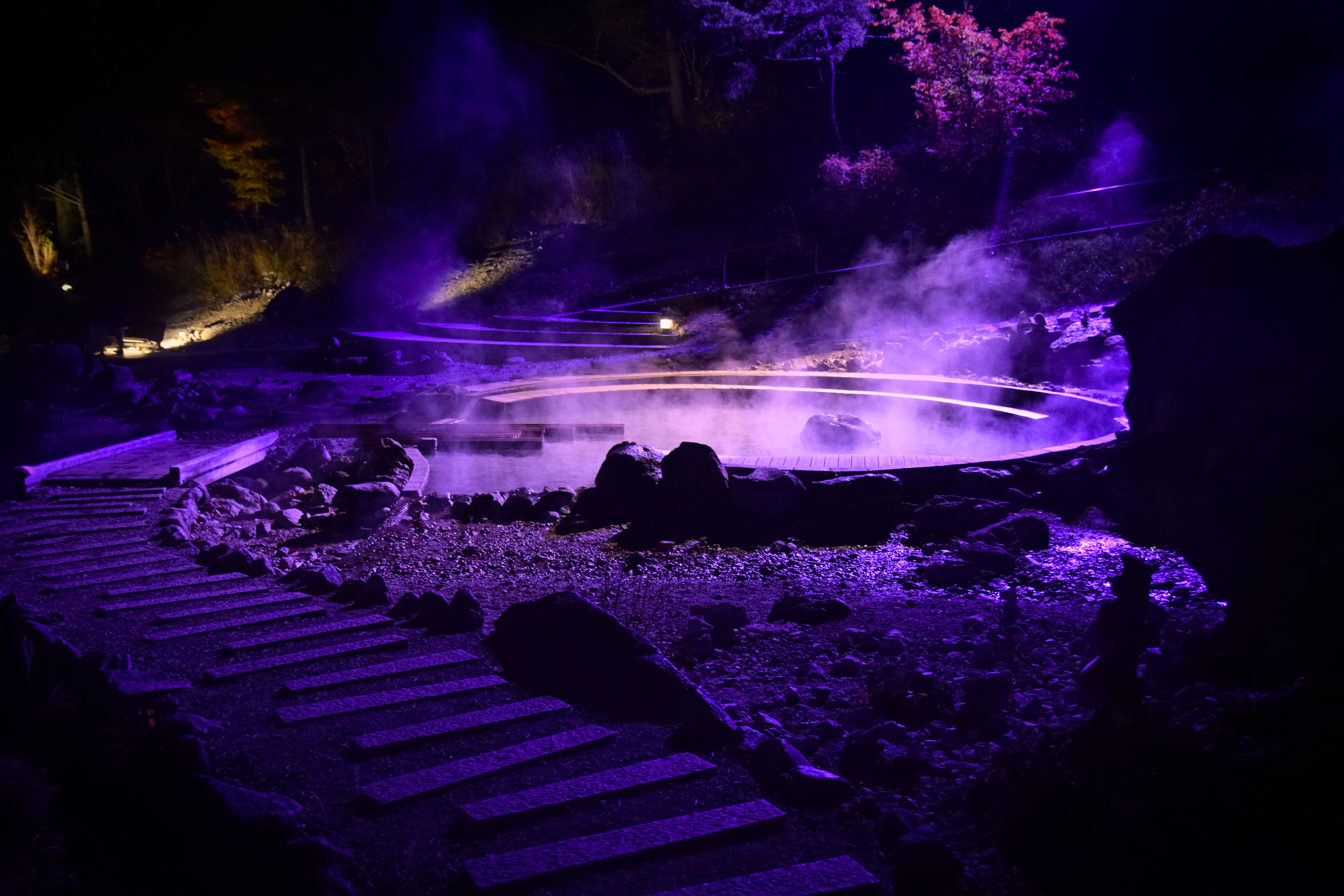
Kusatsu Onsen, a hot springs resort, located in Japan's Gunma Prefecture.

Steam baths have served a deep cultural significance across many civilizations following their development in Rome. In Japan, onsen (hot spring baths) symbolize spiritual renewal, healing, and the treatment of various ailments, with the earliest accounts dating back to the 7th century. Indigenous Mesoamerican temazcales used steam baths made of volcanic stone or adobe to treat illness, connect with community members, and aid in post-battle recovery. Irrespective of location, steam baths have been universally associated with healing, networking, holistic treatment, and ritualistic practice.

== See also ==
- Banya (sauna)—A Russian steam bath
- Hammām
- Hot springs
- List of hot springs in Japan
- List of hot springs in the United States
- List of hot springs
- Onsen
- Public bathing
- Sauna
- Sweat lodge
- Thermae
